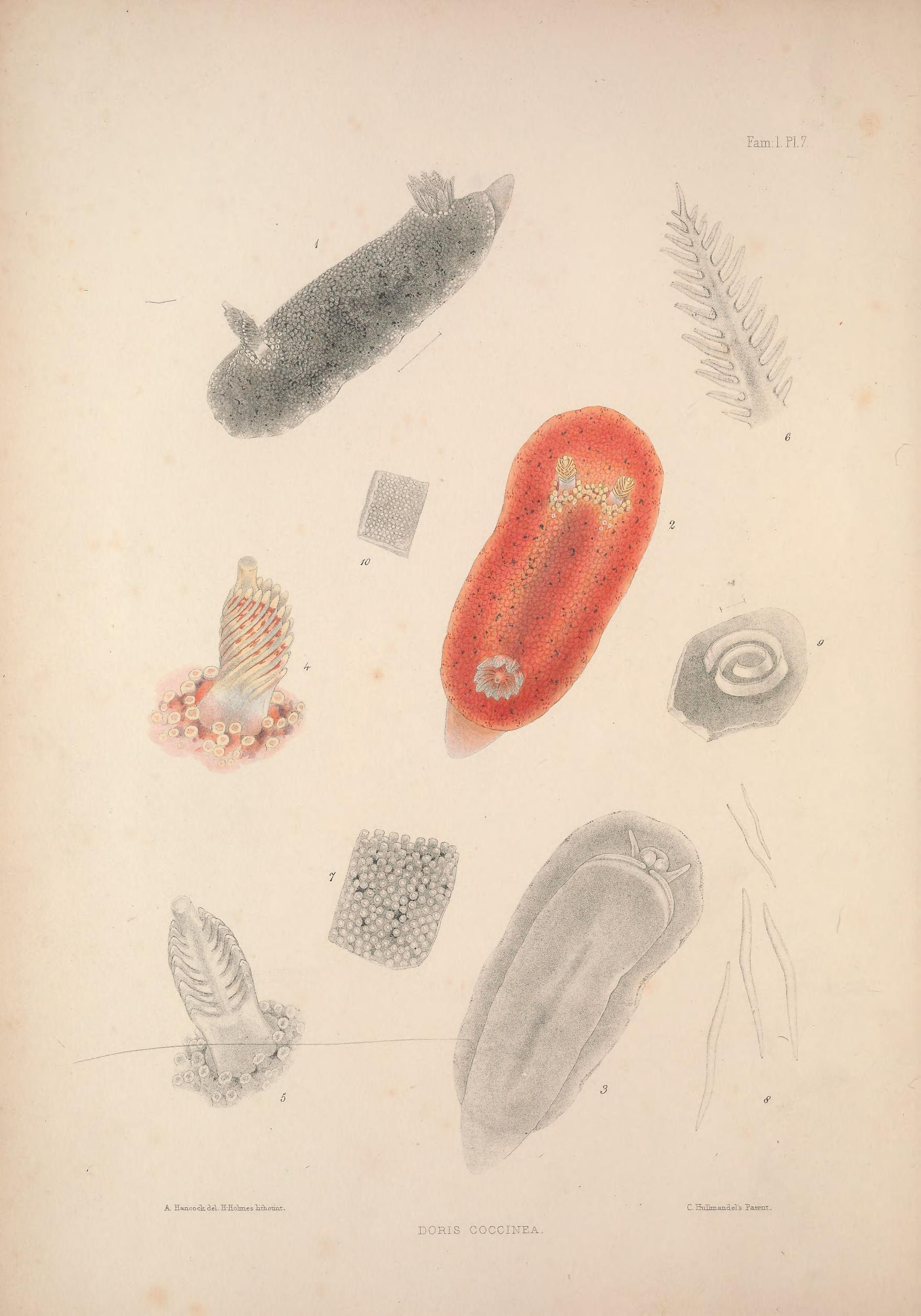
- Rostanga rubra depicted in Alder and Hancock A monograph of the British nudibranchiate Mollusca as Doris coccinea Forbes, 1848

Scientific classification
- Kingdom: Animalia
- Phylum: Mollusca
- Class: Gastropoda
- Order: Nudibranchia
- Family: Discodorididae
- Genus: Rostanga
- Species: R. rubra

Binomial name
- Rostanga rubra (Risso, 1818)

Synonyms
- Doris coccinea Forbes, 1848; Rostanga perspicillata Bergh, 1881; Rostanga rufescens Iredale & O'Donoghue, 1923; Rostanga temarana Pruvot-Fol, 1953

= Rostanga rubra =

Species of gastropod

Rostanga rubra, is a species of sea slug, a dorid nudibranch, a marine gastropod mollusc in the family Discodorididae.

== Distribution ==
This species was described from Nice, France. It has been reported from Norway to Spain on the Atlantic Ocean coasts of Europe and from the Canary Islands and Madeira.

== Description ==
Rostanga rubra is a bright orange to reddish-orange in colour and the dorsum is covered with caryophyllidia; in general it is very similar to other species of Rostanga.

== Ecology ==
This nudibranch is reported to feed on the red sponges, Ophlitaspongia seriata, Clathria atrasanguinea and Ophlitaspongia kildensis (family Microcionidae).
