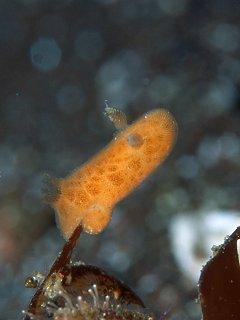
- Rostanga orientalis

Scientific classification
- Kingdom: Animalia
- Phylum: Mollusca
- Class: Gastropoda
- Order: Nudibranchia
- Family: Discodorididae
- Genus: Rostanga
- Species: R. orientalis

Binomial name
- Rostanga orientalis Rudman & Avern, 1989

= Rostanga orientalis =

Species of gastropod

Rostanga orientalis is a species of dorid nudibranch (marine gastropod mollusc) in the family Discodorididae.

== Distribution ==
This species was described from Hoi Ha, Hong Kong. It had previously been reported from Japan, but was misidentified as Rostanga muscula. It has also been reported from Korea.

== Description ==
This dorid nudibranch is red, and the dorsum is covered with caryophyllidia; it is very similar to other species of Rostanga.

== Ecology ==
The food of this species is unknown. Most species of Rostanga feed on sponges of the family Microcionidae.
