= Rostanga dentacus =

Scientific classification
- Kingdom: Animalia
- Phylum: Mollusca
- Class: Gastropoda
- Order: Nudibranchia
- Family: Discodorididae
- Genus: Rostanga
- Species: R. dentacus

Binomial name
- Rostanga dentacus Rudman & Avern, 1989

Species of gastropod

Rostanga dentacus is a species of sea slug, a dorid nudibranch, a marine gastropod mollusc in the family Discodorididae.

== Distribution ==
This species was described from Mirs Bay, Hong Kong. It has subsequently been reported from the Great Barrier Reef, Australia.

== Description ==
Rostanga dentacus is a red dorid nudibranch; the dorsum covered with caryophyllidia. There are a few rounded brown patches on the back, and scattered white specks both at the edge of the mantle and in patches on the back. The rhinophore club is translucent, and speckled with brown pigment.

== Ecology ==
Rostanga dentacus was found on a colony of an unidentified orange sponge. Most other species of Rostanga feed on sponges of the family Microcionidae.
