= Rostanga aliusrubens =

Scientific classification
- Kingdom: Animalia
- Phylum: Mollusca
- Class: Gastropoda
- Order: Nudibranchia
- Family: Discodorididae
- Genus: Rostanga
- Species: R. aliusrubens

Binomial name
- Rostanga aliusrubens Rudman & Avern, 1989

Species of gastropod

Rostanga aliusrubens is a species of sea slug, a dorid nudibranch, a marine gastropod mollusc in the family Discodorididae.

== Distribution ==
This species was described from Darwin, Northern Territory, Australia.

== Description ==
This dorid nudibranch is red and the dorsum is covered with caryophyllidia; it is very similar to other species of Rostanga.

== Ecology ==
Rostanga aliusrubens is found on the red sponge, Clathria lendenfeldi (family Microcionidae) on which it presumably feeds. Most other species of Rostanga also feed on sponges of the family Microcionidae.
