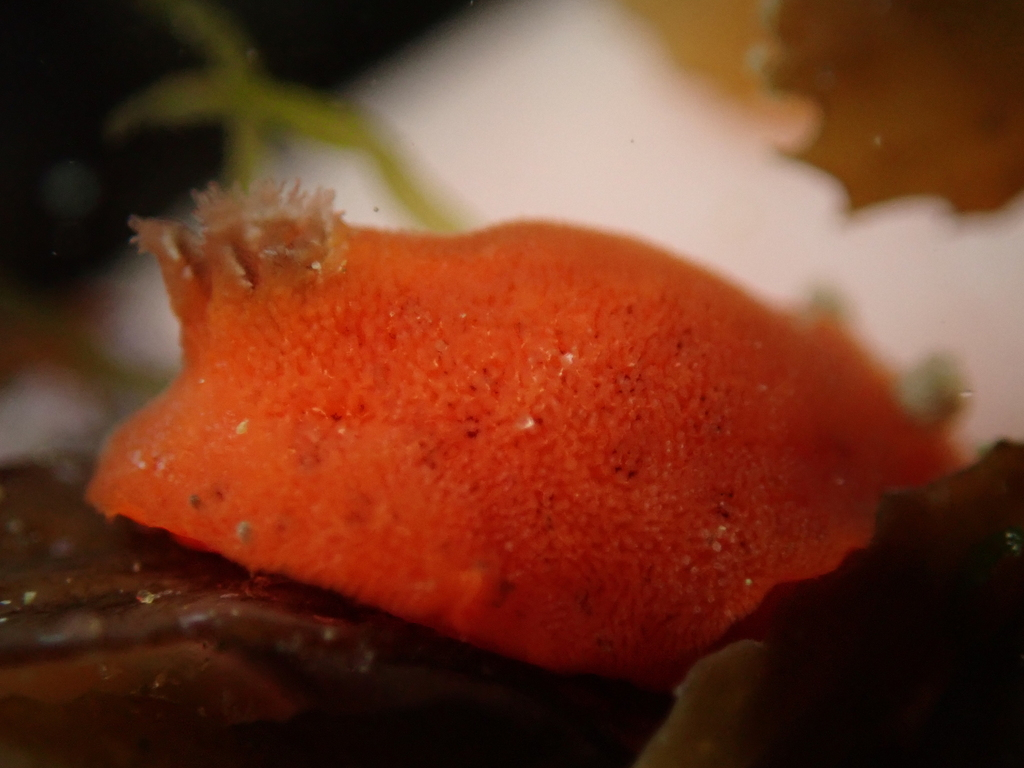

Scientific classification
- Kingdom: Animalia
- Phylum: Mollusca
- Class: Gastropoda
- Order: Nudibranchia
- Family: Discodorididae
- Genus: Rostanga
- Species: R. arbutus

Binomial name
- Rostanga arbutus (Angas, 1864)

= Rostanga arbutus =

Species of gastropod

Rostanga arbutus is a species of sea slug, a dorid nudibranch, a marine gastropod mollusc in the family Discodorididae.

== Distribution ==
This species was described from New South Wales, Australia. It was thought to be widely distributed, but this was due to confusion with other species.

== Description ==
This dorid nudibranch is bright orange to reddish-orange in colour, and the dorsum is covered with caryophyllidia. It is very similar to other species of Rostanga, but it is distinguished by a series of white markings, the mantle glands, which are just inside the mantle edge.

== Ecology ==
This species is found mostly in the intertidal zone on the red sponge, Ophlitaspongia aceratoobtusa (family Microcionidae) on which it presumably feeds. Most other species of Rostanga also feed on sponges of the family Microcionidae.
