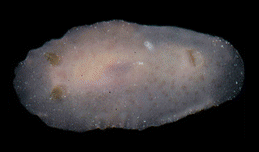
- Dorsal view of Jorunna cf. spazzola
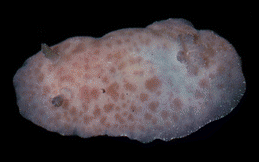
- Dorsal view of Jorunna cf. spazzola

Scientific classification
- Domain: Eukaryota
- Kingdom: Animalia
- Phylum: Mollusca
- Class: Gastropoda
- Order: Nudibranchia
- Family: Discodorididae
- Genus: Jorunna
- Species: J. spazzola

Binomial name
- Jorunna spazzola (Marcus, 1955)

Synonyms
- Awuka spazzola Er. Marcus, 1955; Discodoris mortenseni Ev. Marcus & Er. Marcus, 1963

= Jorunna spazzola =

Species of gastropod

Jorunna spazzola is a species of sea slug, a dorid nudibranch, a shell-less marine gastropod mollusc in the family Discodorididae.

== Taxonomy ==
It is possibly synonymous with Jorunna luisae.

Camacho-García et al. (2014) suggested Caribbean animals identified as Jorunna spazzola could constitute a distinct species, because they display external differences with the original description from southern Brazil.

== Distribution ==
This species was described from Brazil. The distribution of Jorunna spazzola includes Florida, Honduras, Costa Rica, Venezuela, Cuba, Curaçao, Barbados, Virgin Islands, Turks and Caicos, Brazil and Panama.

== Description ==
The body is oval. The mantle is rigid. Dorsum is flattened and covered with small caryophyllidia. Branchial leaves are very short. Background color is translucent gray with a few darker gray or brown patches over the dorsum. Mantle margin is surrounded by small opaque white glands. Rhinophores and gill are the same color as the rest of the body. It is up to 18 mm long or up to is 36 mm.

According to Rudman (2008), this species is known mostly from internal characters and needs clarification.

== Ecology ==
Minimum recorded depth is 0 m. Maximum recorded depth is 1.5 m. It was found under rocks in Panama.

Prey of Jorunna spazzola include sponges of the order Haplosclerida: Callyspongia pallida and Chalinula sp. It is well camouflaged on its prey. This species is able to quickly change colors as a response to unknown environmental cues.
