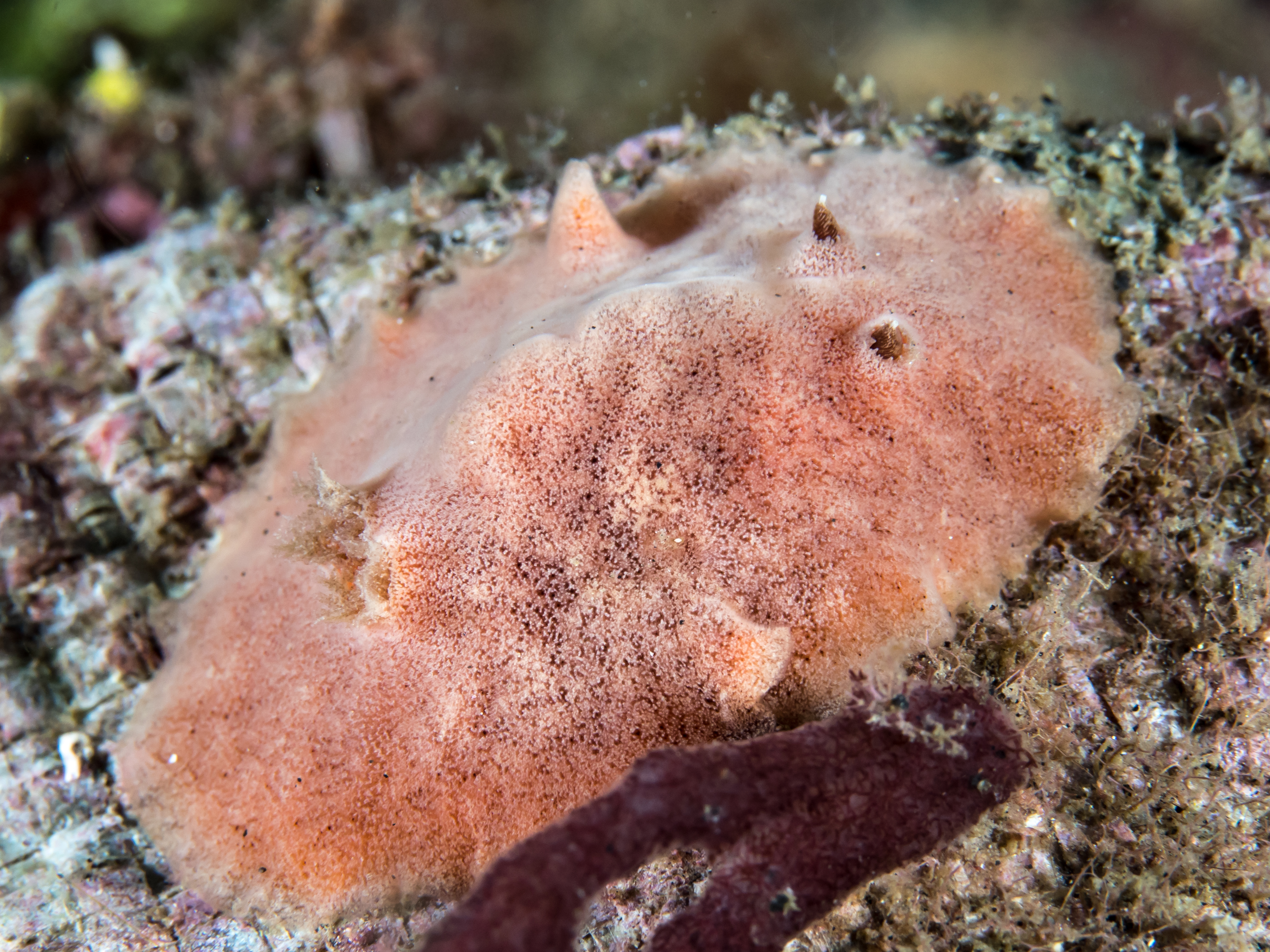
- Lembeh, Indonesia - Rostanga bifurcata

Scientific classification
- Kingdom: Animalia
- Phylum: Mollusca
- Class: Gastropoda
- Order: Nudibranchia
- Family: Discodorididae
- Genus: Rostanga
- Species: R. bifurcata

Binomial name
- Rostanga bifurcata Rudman & Avern, 1989

= Rostanga bifurcata =

Species of gastropod

Rostanga bifurcata is a species of sea slug, a dorid nudibranch, a marine gastropod mollusc in the family Discodorididae.

== Distribution ==
This species was described from Botany Bay, Sydney, Australia. It has subsequently been reported from western Australia, Singapore, Hong Kong, and Tasmania.

== Description ==
This dorid nudibranch is red, and the dorsum is covered with caryophyllidia; it is very similar to other species of Rostanga.

== Ecology ==
This nudibranch is found on a colony of the red sponge, Antho chartacea (family Microcionidae) on which it presumably feeds. Most other species of Rostanga also feed on sponges of the family Microcionidae.
