= Rostanga bassia =

Scientific classification
- Kingdom: Animalia
- Phylum: Mollusca
- Class: Gastropoda
- Order: Nudibranchia
- Family: Discodorididae
- Genus: Rostanga
- Species: R. bassia

Binomial name
- Rostanga bassia Rudman & Avern, 1989

Species of gastropod

Rostanga bassia is a species of sea slug, a dorid nudibranch, a marine gastropod mollusc in the family Discodorididae.

== Distribution ==
This species was described from Flinders, Westernport Bay, Victoria, Australia.

== Description ==
This dorid nudibranch is bright orange to reddish-orange in colour, and the dorsum is covered with caryophyllidia. This species is very similar to other species of Rostanga.

== Ecology ==
This nudibranch is found on a colony of the red sponge, Clathria cactiformis (family Microcionidae) on which it presumably feeds. Most other species of Rostanga also feed on sponges of the family Microcionidae.
