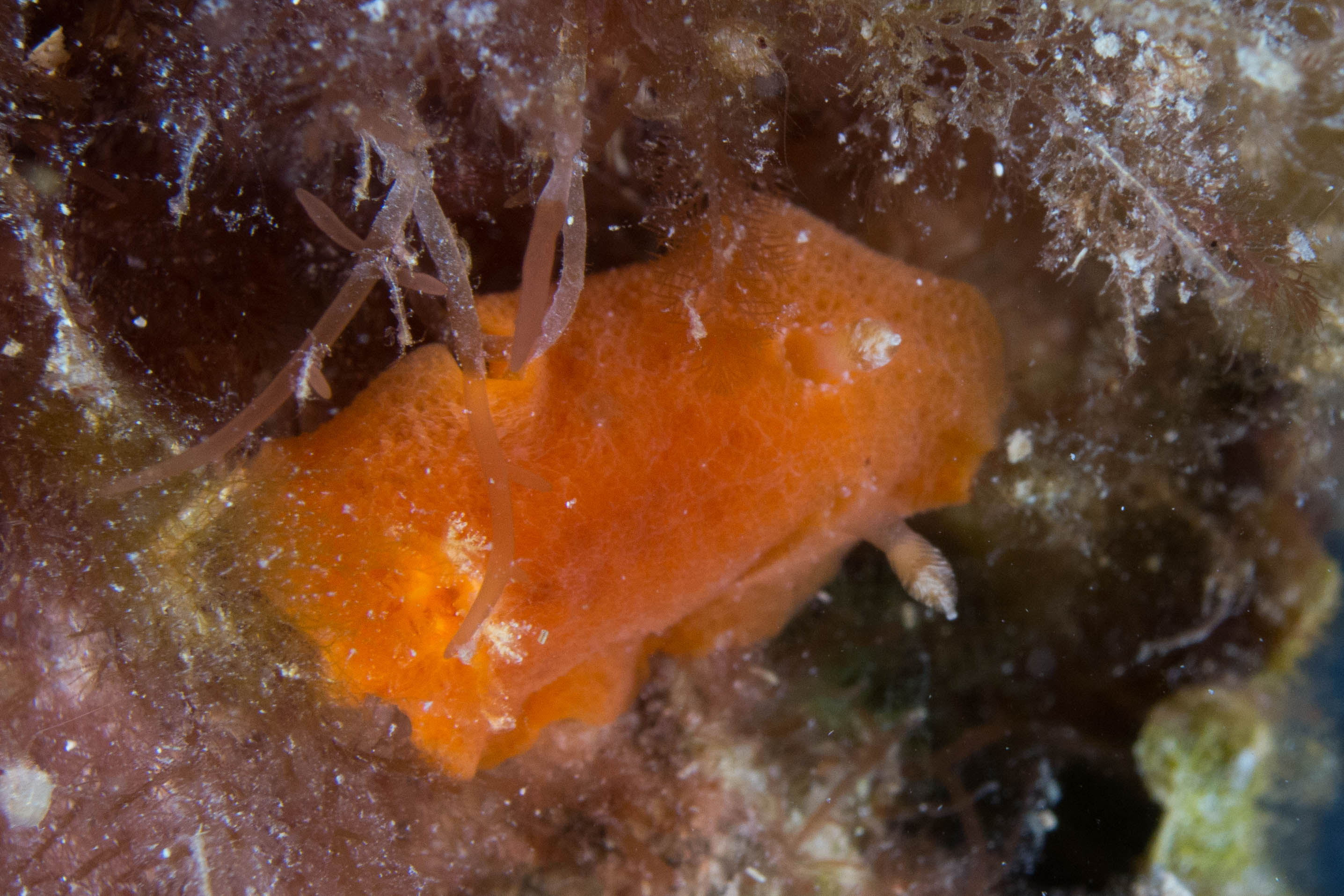
- Rostanga calumus - Rudman & Avern, 1989. Western Australia

Scientific classification
- Kingdom: Animalia
- Phylum: Mollusca
- Class: Gastropoda
- Order: Nudibranchia
- Family: Discodorididae
- Genus: Rostanga
- Species: R. calumus

Binomial name
- Rostanga calumus Rudman & Avern, 1989

= Rostanga calumus =

Species of gastropod

Rostanga calumus is a species of sea slug, a dorid nudibranch, a marine gastropod mollusc in the family Discodorididae.

== Distribution ==
This species was described from Tasmania. It has subsequently been reported from New South Wales and western Australia.

== Description ==
This nudibranch is red, and the dorsum is covered with caryophyllidia. There are regularly distributed, rounded brown patches all over the back, and scattered white specks at the edge of the mantle. The rhinophore club is edged with white pigment.

== Ecology ==
One specimen from Western Australia was found on a colony of the orange sponge, Clathria cf. partita (family Microcionidae) on which it presumably feeds. Most other species of Rostanga also feed on sponges of the family Microcionidae.
