= Rostanga risbeci =

Scientific classification
- Kingdom: Animalia
- Phylum: Mollusca
- Class: Gastropoda
- Order: Nudibranchia
- Family: Discodorididae
- Genus: Rostanga
- Species: R. risbeci

Binomial name
- Rostanga risbeci Baba, 1991

Species of gastropod

Rostanga risbeci, is a species of sea slug, a dorid nudibranch, a marine gastropod mollusc in the family Discodorididae.

== Distribution ==
This species was described from Aitsu, Amakusa, Japan with additional specimens from Sagami Bay and the Echizen coast.

== Description ==
Rostanga risbeci is a purple-black or black dorid nudibranch with the dorsum covered with caryophyllidia; in general it is very similar in shape, but not in colour, to other species of Rostanga.

== Ecology ==
This nudibranch is reported to feed on the black sponge Halichondria okadai - family Halichondriidae. Most species of Rostanga feed on sponges of the family Microcionidae.
