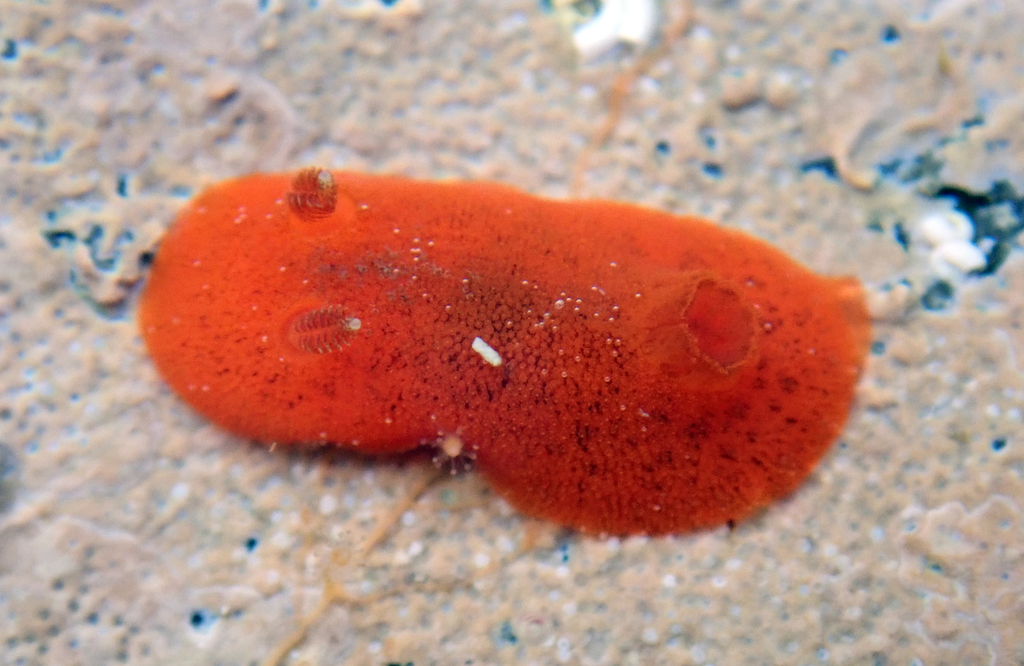

Scientific classification
- Kingdom: Animalia
- Phylum: Mollusca
- Class: Gastropoda
- Order: Nudibranchia
- Family: Discodorididae
- Genus: Rostanga
- Species: R. muscula

Binomial name
- Rostanga muscula (Abraham, 1877)

Synonyms
- Doris muscula Abraham, 1877 (original combination); Doris rubicunda Cheeseman, 1881; Rostanga rubicunda

= Rostanga muscula =

Species of sea slug

Rostanga muscula is a species of sea slug, a dorid nudibranch, a marine gastropod mollusc in the family Discodorididae.

== Distribution ==
This species is endemic to New Zealand.

== Description ==
This dorid nudibranch is bright orange to reddish-orange, and the dorsum is covered with caryophyllidia; it is very similar to other species of Rostanga.

== Ecology ==
This is a common intertidal species. It feeds on the red sponge, Microciona coccinea (family Microcionidae). It is also found to eat the introduced sponge, Ophlitaspongia seriata (=Ophlitaspongia papilla) and the native Holoplocamium neozelanicum
