= Rostanga alisae =

Scientific classification
- Kingdom: Animalia
- Phylum: Mollusca
- Class: Gastropoda
- Order: Nudibranchia
- Family: Discodorididae
- Genus: Rostanga
- Species: R. alisae

Binomial name
- Rostanga alisae Martynov, 2003

Species of gastropod

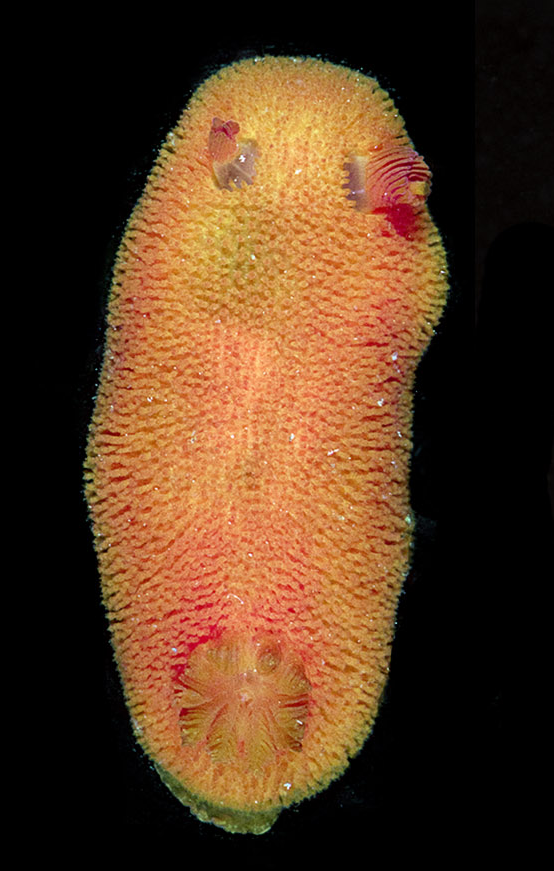
Rostanga alisae

Rostanga alisae is a species of sea slug, a dorid nudibranch, a marine gastropod mollusc in the family Discodorididae.

== Distribution ==
This species was described from Peter the Great Bay, Japan Sea, Russia.

== Ecology ==
This nudibranch is found from the intertidal zone to 15 m depth, feeding on the red sponge Ophlitaspongia pennata in the family Microcionidae.
