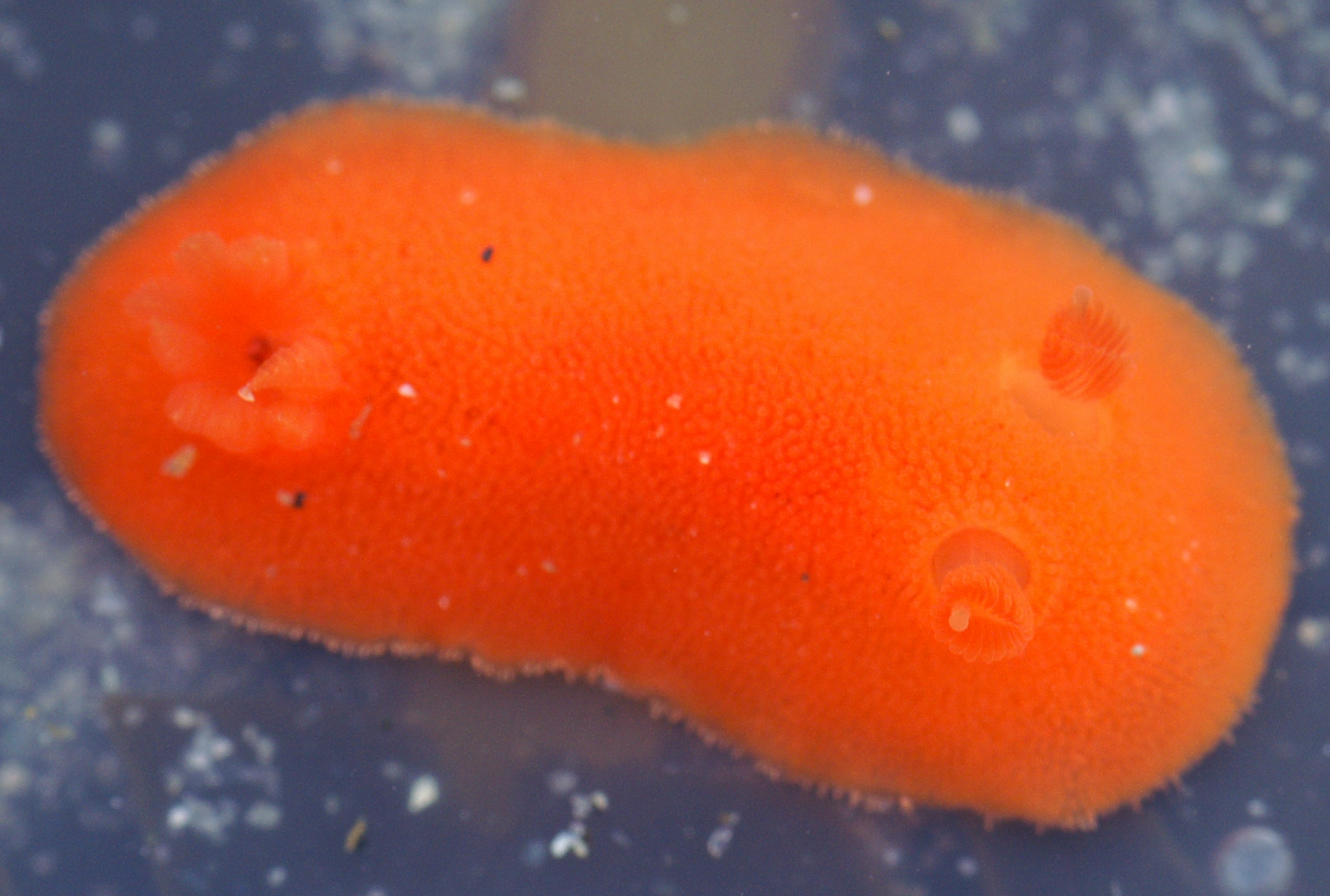
- A live individual of Rostanga pulchra, head end towards the right

Scientific classification
- Kingdom: Animalia
- Phylum: Mollusca
- Class: Gastropoda
- Order: Nudibranchia
- Family: Discodorididae
- Genus: Rostanga (Bergh, 1879)

Type species
- Doris coccinea Forbes, 1848

Synonyms
- Boreodoris Odhner, 1939; Rhabdochila P. Fischer, 1883

= Rostanga =

Genus of gastropods

Rostanga is a genus of sea slugs in the family Discodorididae. Some sources, such as The Sea Slug Forum still classify Rostanga in the family Dorididae.

== Phylogeny ==
A phylogenetic analysis shows that the species Rostanga aureamala, Rostanga elandsia, Rostanga pepha and Rostanga setidens form a sister group with the other species in this genus. The species from Japan and the Marshall Islands form the basal clade. The species from the tropical Indo-Pacific are not monophyletic. The species from the Atlantic Ocean and the Eastern Pacific from a clade that is a sister group to R. australis. The Indo-Pacific species Rostanga bifurcata forms a sister group to Rostanga dentacus.

== Species ==
Species within the genus Rostanga include:

- Rostanga alisae Martynov, 2003
- Rostanga aliusrubens Rudman & Avern, 1989
- Rostanga ankyra Valdés, 2001
- Rostanga anthelia Perrone, 1991
- Rostanga arbutus (Angas, 1864)
- Rostanga aureamala Garovoy, Valdés & Gosliner, 2001
- Rostanga bassia Rudman & Avern, 1989
- Rostanga bifurcata Rudman & Avern, 1989
- Rostanga byga Er. Marcus, 1958
- Rostanga calumus Rudman & Avern, 1989
- Rostanga crawfordi (Burn, 1969)
- Rostanga crocea Edmunds, 2011
- Rostanga dentacus Rudman & Avern, 1989
- Rostanga elandsia Garovoy, Valdés & Gosliner, 2001
- Rostanga ghiselini Gosliner & Bertsch, 2017
- Rostanga lutescens (Bergh, 1905)
- Rostanga muscula (Abraham, 1877)
- Rostanga orientalis Rudman & Avern, 1989
- Rostanga phepha Garovoy, Valdés & Gosliner, 2001
- Rostanga pulchra (MacFarland, 1905)
- Rostanga risbeci Baba, 1991
- Rostanga rubra (Risso, 1818)
- Rostanga setidens (Odhner, 1939)

Species brought into synonymy

- Rostanga australis Rudman & Avern, 1989: synonym of Rostanga crawfordi (Burn, 1969)
- Rostanga evansi Eliot, 1906 : synonym of Jorunna evansi (Eliot, 1906)
- Rostanga hartleyi Burn, 1958 : synonym of Jorunna hartleyi (Burn, 1958)
