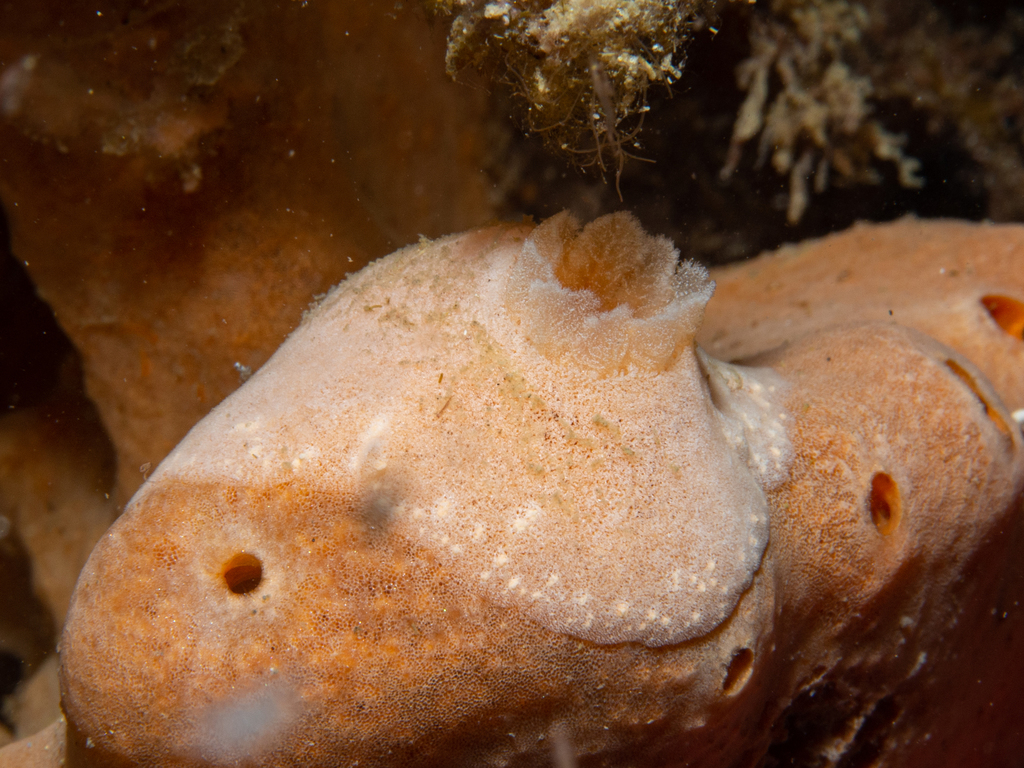

Scientific classification
- Kingdom: Animalia
- Phylum: Mollusca
- Class: Gastropoda
- Order: Nudibranchia
- Family: Discodorididae
- Genus: Rostanga
- Species: R. crawfordi

Binomial name
- Rostanga crawfordi (Burn, 1969)

Synonyms
- Rostanga australis Rudman & Avern, 1989

= Rostanga crawfordi =

Species of gastropod

Rostanga crawfordi is a species of sea slug, a dorid nudibranch, a marine gastropod mollusc in the family Discodorididae. Originally described as Discodoris crawfordi, it was redescribed by Rudman & Avern as Rostanga australis. The two names were synonymised by Dayrat. It was named after Tom Crawford, an Australian malacologist who compiled an extensive collection of Opisthobranchia prior to his death in 1966 at the age of 22.

== Distribution ==
This species was described from Port Phillip, Victoria, Australia. It is known only from Victoria, South Australia and Western Australia, Australia.

== Description ==
This dorid nudibranch is pale orange-yellow to orange-pink in colour; the dorsum is covered with caryophyllidia.

== Ecology ==
Rostanga crawfordi is found on the red sponge, Psammoclema, on which it presumably feeds. This sponge genus is currently classified in the family Chondropsidae. Most other species of Rostanga feed on sponges of the family Microcionidae.
