= Rostanga ankyra =

Scientific classification
- Kingdom: Animalia
- Phylum: Mollusca
- Class: Gastropoda
- Order: Nudibranchia
- Family: Discodorididae
- Genus: Rostanga
- Species: R. ankyra

Binomial name
- Rostanga ankyra Valdés, 2001

Species of gastropod

Rostanga ankyra is a species of sea slug, a dorid nudibranch, and a marine gastropod mollusc in the family Discodorididae.

== Distribution ==
This species was collected from 650 m (2,130 ft) depth, south of New Caledonia, 24°40′S 168°38′E

== Description ==
The living animal is uniformly white, with typical shape and caryophyllidia covering the mantle surface as is normal for species of Rostanga. Only three species of Rostanga are white in colour, Rostanga setidens and Rostanga phepha. Rostanga phepha has the dorsum covered with purplish brown spots.
