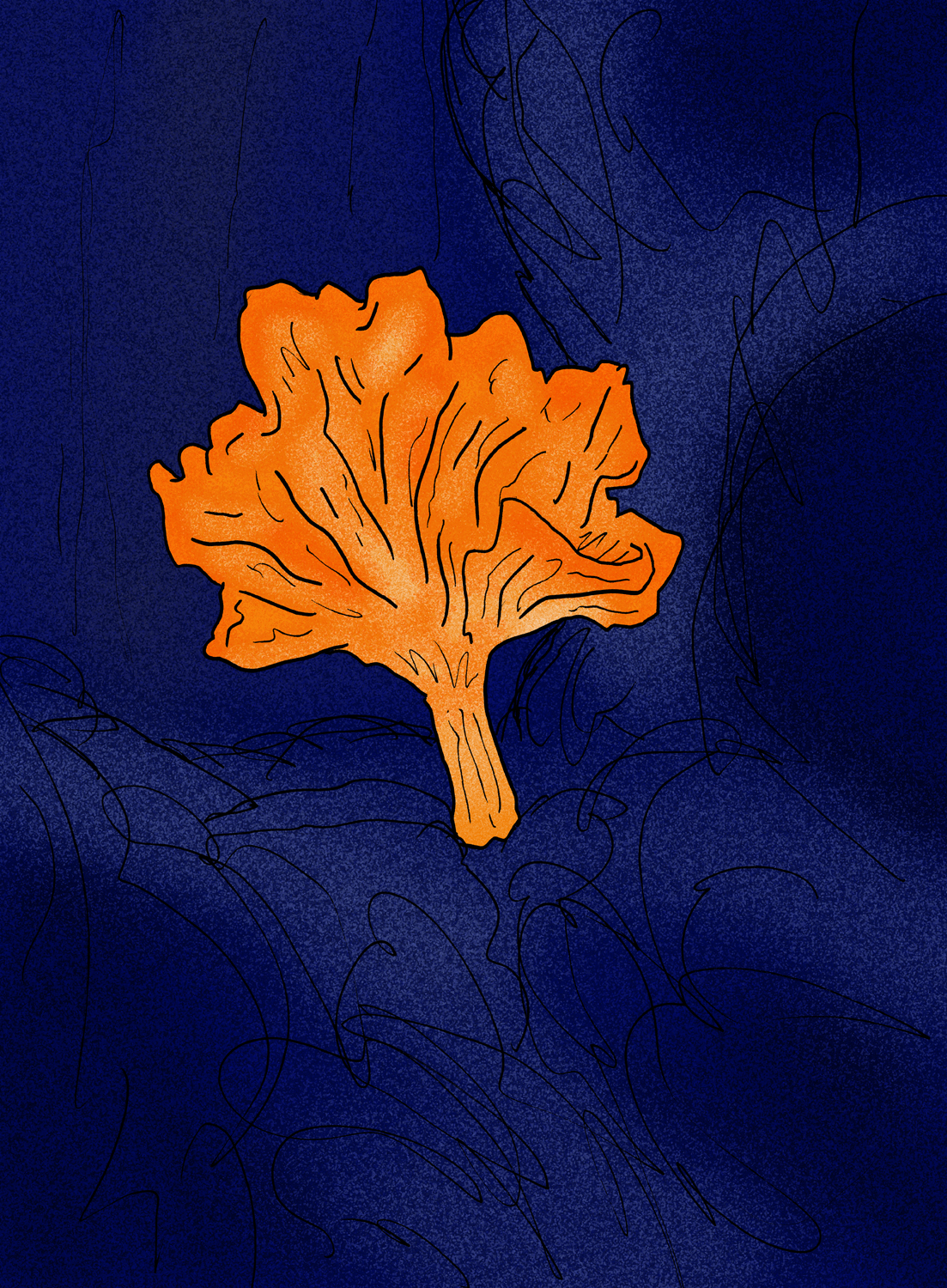
- Illustration

Scientific classification
- Domain: Eukaryota
- Kingdom: Animalia
- Phylum: Porifera
- Class: Demospongiae
- Order: Poecilosclerida
- Family: Microcionidae
- Genus: Antho
- Subgenus: Acarnia
- Species: A. prima

Binomial name
- Antho prima (Brøndsted, 1924)

Synonyms
- Lissoplocamia prima Brøndsted, 1924; Plocamia prima (Brøndsted, 1924)

= Antho prima =

Species of sponge

Antho prima, or Antho (Acarnia) prima also known as the orange fan sponge is a species of sponge belonging to the genus Antho found on the south coast of South Africa and the coast of New Zealand.

== Description ==
A. prima has a pale peach to dirty orange color and grows in a convoluted fan form that could reach a height of 160 mm (6.3 in). Its surface is fuzzy and may be covered with a slimy mucus. The sponge is fragile and breaks easily.

== Distribution ==
The orange fan sponge can be found off of the south coast of South Africa and the coast of New Zealand. It is found at depths of 57–164 m (187–538 ft).
