= Salegentibacter agarivorans =

Scientific classification
- Domain: Bacteria
- Kingdom: Pseudomonadati
- Phylum: Bacteroidota
- Class: Flavobacteriia
- Order: Flavobacteriales
- Family: Flavobacteriaceae
- Genus: Salegentibacter
- Species: S. agarivorans

Binomial name
- Salegentibacter agarivorans Nedashkovskaya et al. 2006

Type strain
- KMM 7019

Bacterium

Salegentibacter agarivorans is a Gram-negative, strictly aerobic, heterotrophic and motile bacterium from the genus of Salegentibacter which has been isolated from a sponge Artemisina sp.
