= Ophlitaspongia papilla =

Scientific classification
- Kingdom: Animalia
- Phylum: Porifera
- Class: Demospongiae
- Order: Poecilosclerida
- Family: Microcionidae
- Genus: Ophlitaspongia
- Species: O. papilla

Binomial name
- Ophlitaspongia papilla Bowerbank, 1866

Synonyms
- Chalina seriata (sensu Johnston, 1842); Chalinula seriata (Grant, 1826); Clathria seriata (Johnston, 1842); Halichondria seriata Johnston, 1842; Ophlitaspongia seriata (Johnston, 1842)

Species of sponge

Ophlitaspongia papilla is a species of demosponge belonging to the family Microcionidae. It is found along north-eastern Atlantic coastlines. This is a red sponge which forms thin, smooth encrusting patches, up to 5 cm across, with regularly spaced oscula.

== Description ==
Ophlitaspongia papilla forms small encrusting patches seldom more than 5 cm (2 in) across on boulders and rocks. It is very thin and flat with a smooth, shiny surface. The oscula are well-defined and regularly distributed, each having a small collar with a slightly raised edge. The colour of this sponge is blood red.

== Distribution and habitat ==
Ophlitaspongia papilla occurs in the northeastern Atlantic Ocean, its range extending from the British Isles to the Canary Islands, the Azores and Madeira. It is also known from New Zealand waters. It normally occupies a zone between the average high water mark of neap tides and 2 m (6 ft 7 in) below the average level low water of spring tides. It is occasionally found at slightly greater depths, encrusting the shells of bivalve molluscs such as Chlamys opercularis. It tends to be found in areas with high water movement, either from currents or the action of waves, and is usually found under overhangs, on vertical walls, in crevices or on ledges.

== Life cycle ==
Larvae are liberated by Ophlitaspongia papilla over a period of about a month in late summer. These initially swim upwards, rotating as they swim, and remain at the surface. Most later swim downwards and descend to the substrate where they can creep about before metamorphosis takes place some 24 to 36 hours after liberation, but some metamorphose on the surface. Mortality is high in widely separated individuals but lower when several undergo metamorphosis close together, as these individuals subsequently coalesce into fused masses. It is possible that these masses could be formed by larvae from different sponge populations. The result may be equivalent to cross-fertilisation within a common envelope and result in an enlarged gene pool and the efficient production of genetic diversity.
