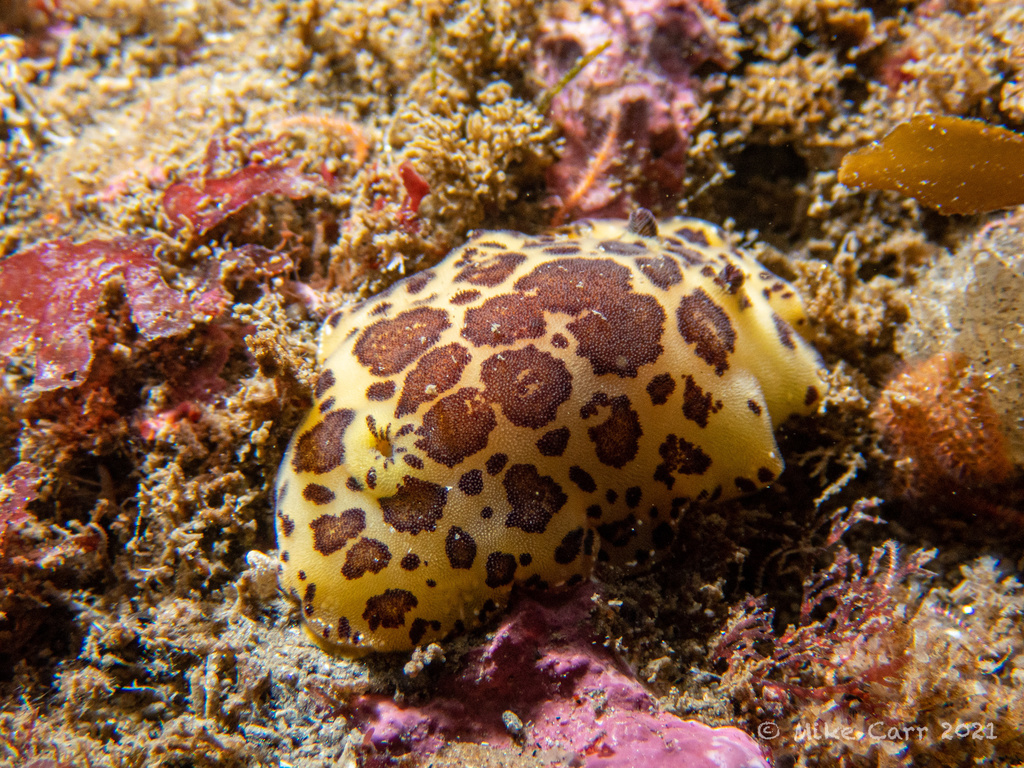

Scientific classification
- Kingdom: Animalia
- Phylum: Mollusca
- Class: Gastropoda
- Order: Nudibranchia
- Family: Discodorididae
- Genus: Jorunna
- Species: J. pardus

Binomial name
- Jorunna pardus Behrens & Henderson, 1981

= Jorunna pardus =

Species of gastropod

Jorunna pardus is a species of sea slug, a dorid nudibranch, a shell-less marine gastropod mollusc in the family Discodorididae.

== Distribution ==
This species was described from California. It is found from southern California to Sacramento Reef, Baja California. It lives on or under rocks in the intertidal and subtidal, from 5 to 18 m depth.

== Description ==
This species is similar in colouration to Jorunna parva from Japan, but a much bigger animal when fully grown. It reaches at least 50 mm in length. Its gills and rhinophores are brown instead of pale with brown edges.
