= Rostanga byga =

Scientific classification
- Kingdom: Animalia
- Phylum: Mollusca
- Class: Gastropoda
- Order: Nudibranchia
- Family: Discodorididae
- Genus: Rostanga
- Species: R. byga

Binomial name
- Rostanga byga Er. Marcus, 1958

Species of gastropod

Rostanga byga is a species of sea slug, a dorid nudibranch, a marine gastropod mollusc in the family Discodorididae.

== Distribution ==
This species was described from the Caribbean Sea. Its distribution includes also Rio de Janeiro State, southeastern Brazil.

== Description ==
This doric nudibranch is bright orange to reddish orange in colour, and the dorsum is covered with caryophyllidia; it is very similar to other species of Rostanga. The colour is very uniform, but the rhinophores have white tips.

The maximum recorded body length is 20 mm.

== Ecology ==
The prey of Rostanga byga includes the sponge Mycale microsigmatosa. Recorded from depths of 0 m (0 ft) to 65 m (213 ft).
