= Rostanga setidens =

Scientific classification
- Kingdom: Animalia
- Phylum: Mollusca
- Class: Gastropoda
- Order: Nudibranchia
- Family: Discodorididae
- Genus: Rostanga
- Species: R. setidens

Binomial name
- Rostanga setidens (Odhner, 1939)

Species of gastropod

Rostanga setidens is a species of sea slug, a dorid nudibranch. It is a marine gastropod mollusc in the family Discodorididae.

== Distribution ==
This species was described from Norway.

== Description ==
Rostanga setidens is white in colour, a character shared only with Rostanga phepha and Rostanga ankyra.
