= R. crocea =

R. crocea may refer to:

- Ramariopsis crocea, a coral fungus
- Rhamnus crocea, an evergreen shrub
- Rhodotorula crocea, a pigmented yeast
- Romulea crocea, a flowering plant
- Rostanga crocea, a sea slug
- Russula crocea, a mycorrhizal fungus
