= Salegentibacter mishustinae =

Scientific classification
- Domain: Bacteria
- Kingdom: Pseudomonadati
- Phylum: Bacteroidota
- Class: Flavobacteriia
- Order: Flavobacteriales
- Family: Flavobacteriaceae
- Genus: Salegentibacter
- Species: S. mishustinae

Binomial name
- Salegentibacter mishustinae Nedashkovskaya et al. 2005

Type strain
- KMM 6049

Bacterium

Salegentibacter mishustinae is a Gram-negative, strictly aerobic, heterotrophic and non-motile bacterium from the genus of Salegentibacter which has been isolate from a sea urchin (Strongylocentrotus intermedius) from the Sea of Japan.
