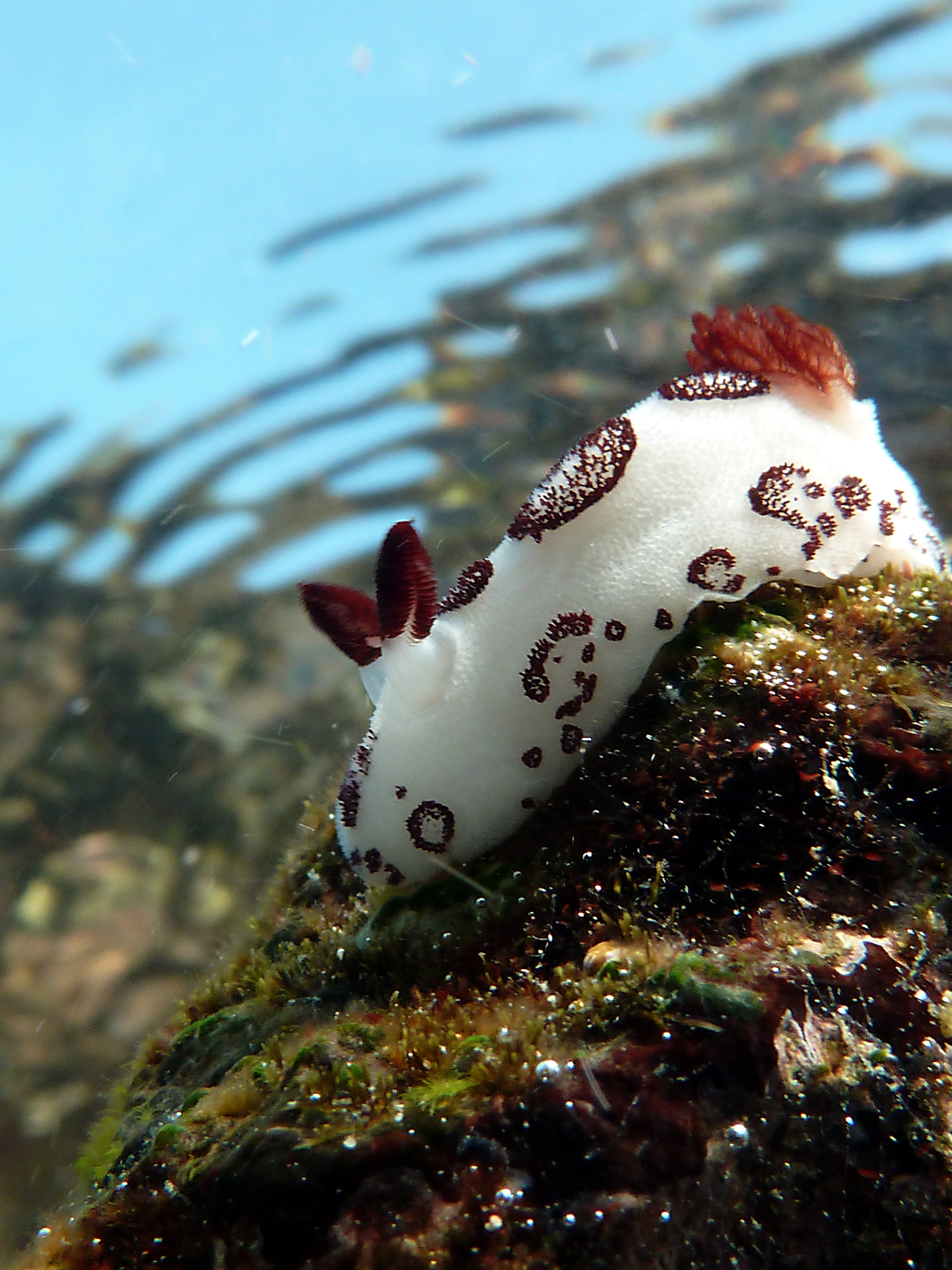
- Jorunna funebris

Scientific classification
- Kingdom: Animalia
- Phylum: Mollusca
- Class: Gastropoda
- Order: Nudibranchia
- Family: Discodorididae
- Genus: Jorunna; Bergh, 1876

= Jorunna =

Genus of gastropods

Jorunna is a genus of sea slugs, dorid nudibranchs, shell-less marine gastropod molluscs in the family Discodorididae.

The name Jorunna comes from the latinization of the name of the character Jorunn from the Laxdæla saga.

== Biology ==
Jorunna species are usually camouflaged to match the sponges they feed on, which in many cases belong to the family Chalinidae. It is likely that many undescribed species exist.

== Species ==
There are more than 20 species in genus Jorunna.

- Jorunna alisonae Ev. Marcus, 1976
- Jorunna coloradilla Ortea & Moro, 2016
- Jorunna efe Ortea, Moro & Caballer, 2014
- Jorunna evansi (Eliot, 1906)
- Jorunna funebris (Kelaart, 1859)
- Jorunna ghanensis Edmunds, 2011
- Jorunna glandulosa Edmunds, 2011
- Jorunna hartleyi (Burn, 1958)
- Jorunna labialis (Eliot, 1908)
- Jorunna onubensis Cervera, Garcia-Gomez & Garcia, 1986
- Jorunna osae Camacho-Garcia & Gosliner, 2008
- Jorunna pantherina (Angas, 1864)
- Jorunna pardus Behrens & Henderson, 1981
- Jorunna parva (Baba, 1938)
- Jorunna ramicola M.C. Miller, 1996
- Jorunna rubescens (Bergh, 1876)
- Jorunna spazzola (Er. Marcus, 1955)
- Jorunna spongiosa Alvim & Pimenta, 2013
- Jorunna tempisquensis Camacho-Garcia & Gosliner, 2008
- Jorunna tomentosa (Cuvier, 1804)

Species brought into synonymy

- Jorunna johnstoni (Alder & Hancock, 1845): synonym of Jorunna tomentosa (Cuvier, 1804) - type species of the genus Jorunna
- Jorunna lemchei Ev. Marcus, 1976 : synonym of Gargamella lemchei (Ev. Marcus, 1976)
- Jorunna luisae Ev. Marcus, 1976: synonym of Jorunna evansi (Eliot, 1906)
- Jorunna malcolmi Ev. Marcus, 1976: synonym of Jorunna labialis (Eliot, 1908)
- Jorunna marchadi Risbec, 1956: synonym of Asteronotus cespitosus van Hasselt, 1824
- Jorunna zania Ev. Marcus, 1976: synonym of Jorunna funebris (Kelaart, 1859)
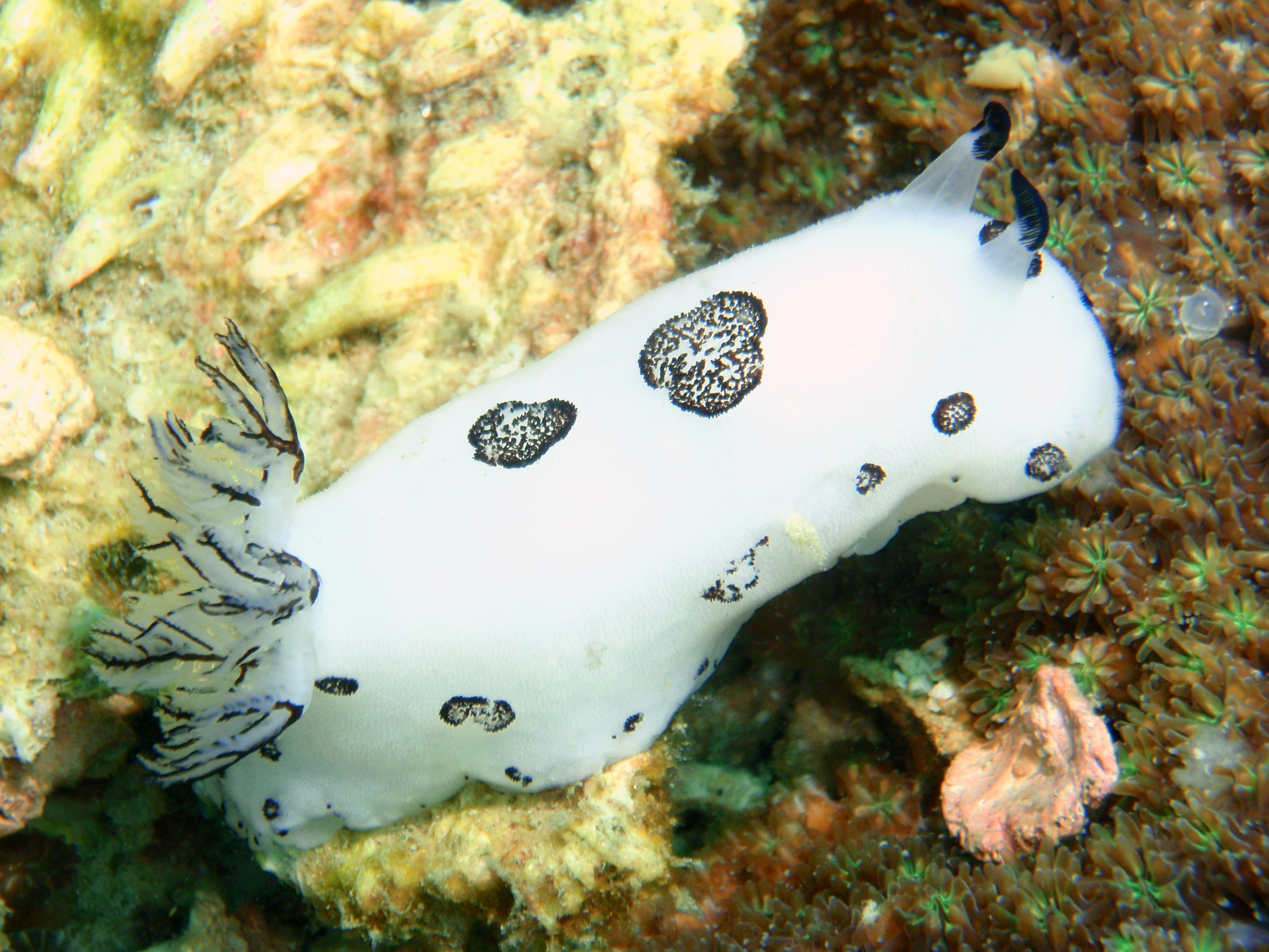
Jorunna funebris

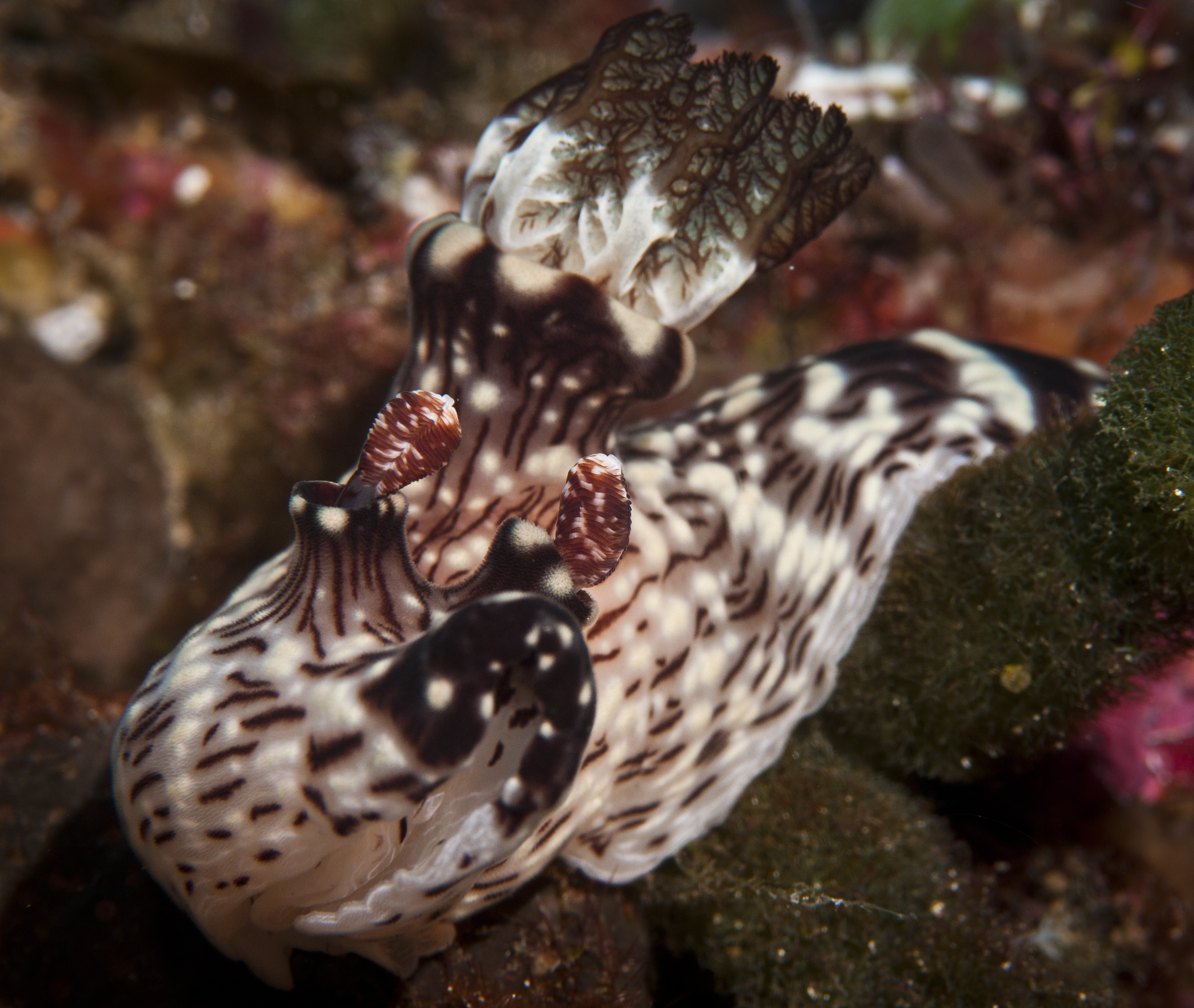
Jorunna rubescens

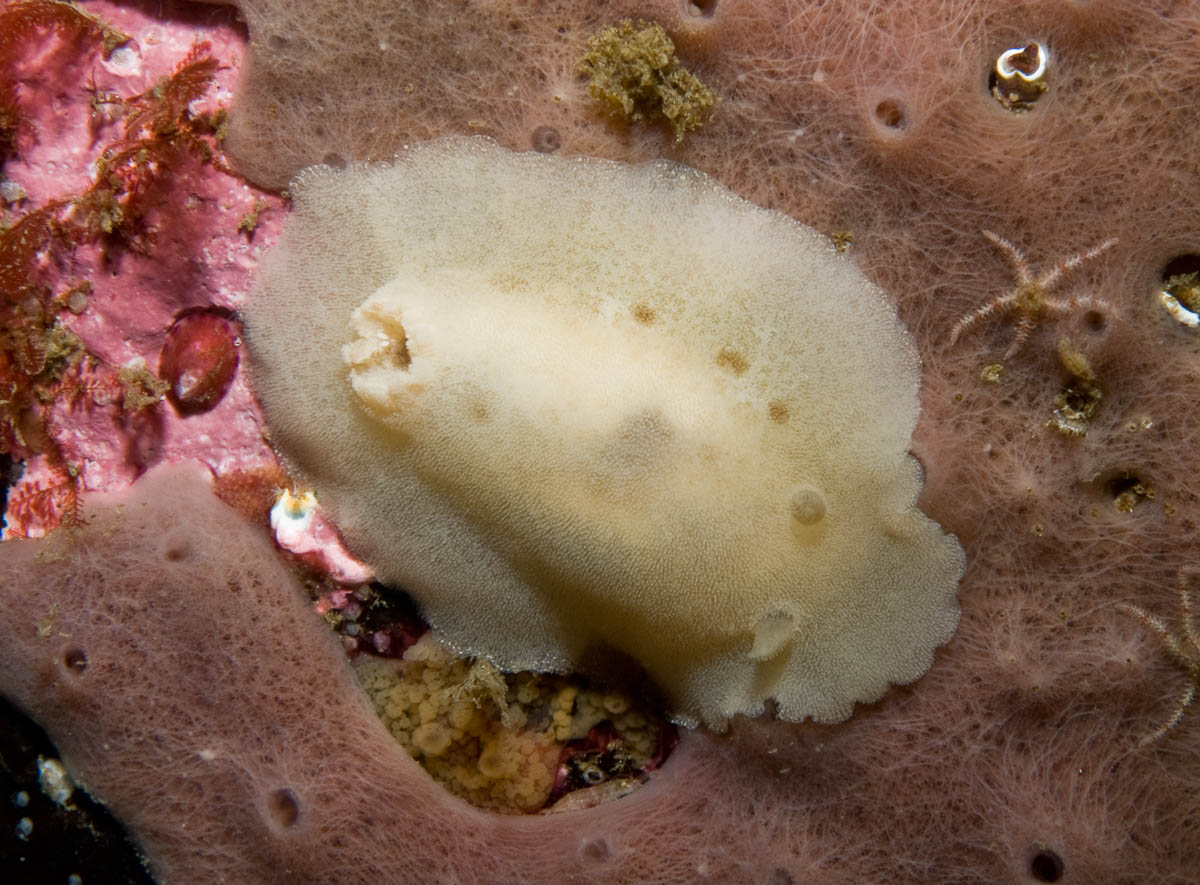
Jorunna tomentosa

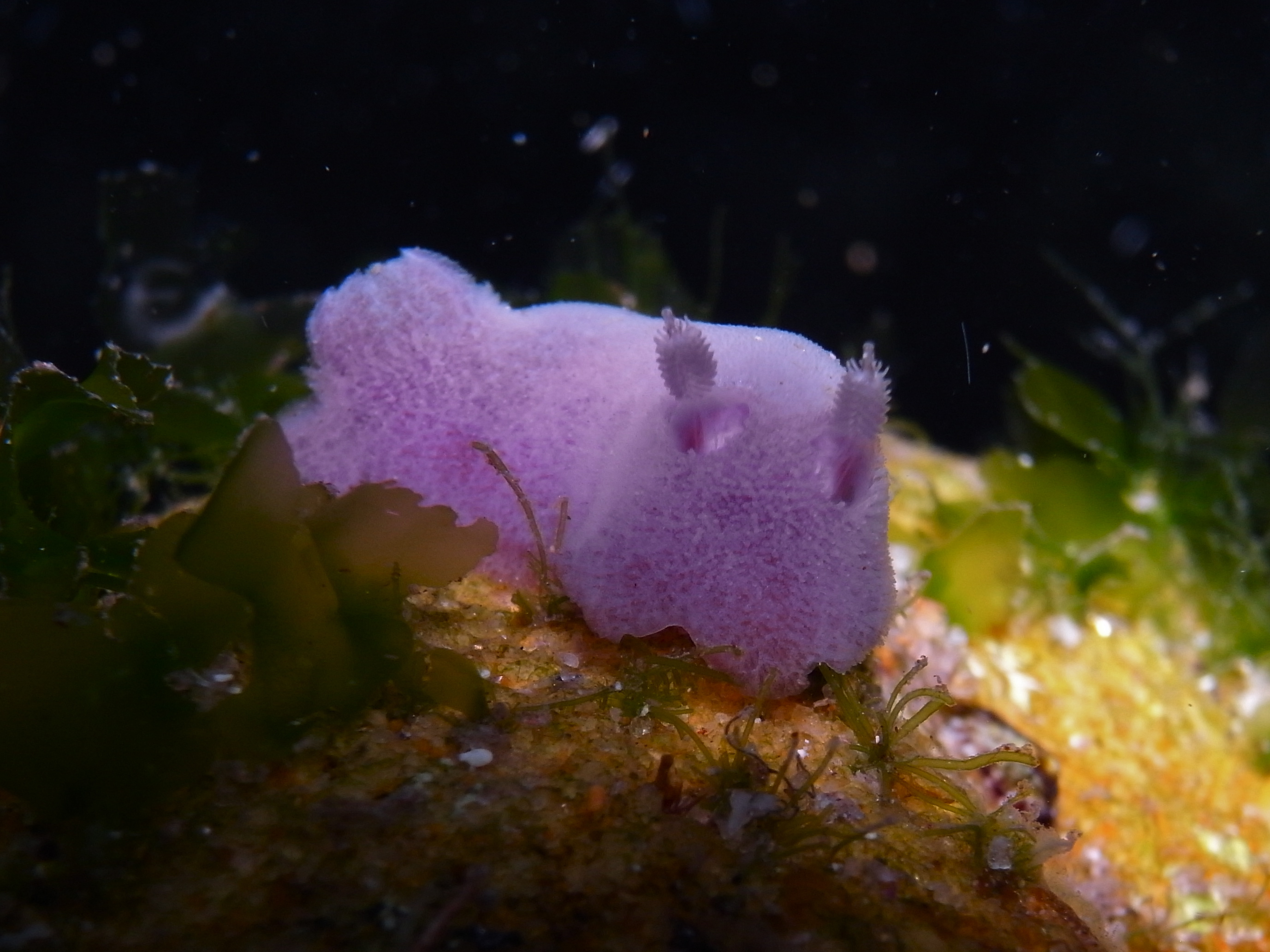
Jorunna sp-Mauve Jorunna
