= Rostanga aureamala =

Scientific classification
- Kingdom: Animalia
- Phylum: Mollusca
- Class: Gastropoda
- Order: Nudibranchia
- Family: Discodorididae
- Genus: Rostanga
- Species: R. aureamala

Binomial name
- Rostanga aureamala Garovoy, Valdés & Gosliner, 2001

Species of gastropod

Rostanga aureamala is a species of sea slug, a dorid nudibranch, a marine gastropod mollusc in the family Discodorididae.

== Distribution ==
This species was described from Algoa Bay, South Africa, 34°1′10.68″S 25°43′0.69″E.

== Description ==
This dorid nudibranch is bright orange to reddish-orange in colour and the dorsum is covered with caryophyllidia; in form it is very similar to other species of Rostanga. It grows to 45 mm (1.8 in) in length. It is illustrated as Rostanga sp. 3 in Gosliner, 1987.
