= Jorunna spongiosa =

Scientific classification
- Kingdom: Animalia
- Phylum: Mollusca
- Class: Gastropoda
- Order: Nudibranchia
- Family: Discodorididae
- Genus: Jorunna
- Species: J. spongiosa

Binomial name
- Jorunna spongiosa Alvim & Pimenta, 2013

Species of gastropod

Jorunna spongiosa is a species of sea slug, a dorid nudibranch, a shell-less marine gastropod mollusc in the family Discodorididae.

== Distribution ==
This species was described from Brazil.

== Ecology ==
Prey of Jorunna spongiosa include sponges Haliclona sp., Callyspongia pallida and Callyspongia sp.
