= Jorunna tempisquensis =

Scientific classification
- Kingdom: Animalia
- Phylum: Mollusca
- Class: Gastropoda
- Order: Nudibranchia
- Family: Discodorididae
- Genus: Jorunna
- Species: J. tempisquensis

Binomial name
- Jorunna tempisquensis Camacho-Garcia & Gosliner, 2008

Species of gastropod

Jorunna tempisquensis is a species of sea slug, a dorid nudibranch, a shell-less marine gastropod mollusc in the family Discodorididae.

== Etymology ==
Jorunna tempisquensis is named after the Tempisque Conservation Area in Costa Rica.

== Distribution ==
This species was described from Cabo Blanco, Costa Rica, Pacific Ocean. Additional specimens from Mexico and Costa Rica are reported in the original description. Most of the specimens are from the Intertidal region to 2 m depth.

== Description ==
The background colour of living Jorunna tempisquensis varies from light cream through light brown to dark purplish black. In darker specimens, the centre of the back has large, light brown or black spots of different sizes. The rhinophores are light cream to light brown, speckled with minute dark brown spots and with yellowish white tips. The gills have bases of dark brown to almost purple and light yellow tips with some minute brown spots. This species is reported to reach 21 mm in length.
