= Jorunna labialis =

Scientific classification
- Kingdom: Animalia
- Phylum: Mollusca
- Class: Gastropoda
- Order: Nudibranchia
- Family: Discodorididae
- Genus: Jorunna
- Species: J. labialis

Binomial name
- Jorunna labialis (Eliot, 1908)

Synonyms
- Kentrodoris labialis Eliot, 1908 Jorunna malcolmi Marcus, 1976

Species of gastropod

Jorunna labialis is a species of sea slug, a dorid nudibranch, a shell-less marine gastropod mollusc in the family Discodorididae.

== Distribution ==
This species was described from the Red Sea. It has been reported from Tanzania and Madagascar in the Indian Ocean.
