= Salegentibacter salegens =

Scientific classification
- Domain: Bacteria
- Kingdom: Pseudomonadati
- Phylum: Bacteroidota
- Class: Flavobacteriia
- Order: Flavobacteriales
- Family: Flavobacteriaceae
- Genus: Salegentibacter
- Species: S. salegens

Binomial name
- Salegentibacter salegens (Dobson et al. 1993) McCammon and Bowman 2000

Synonyms
- Flavibacterium salegens, Flavobacterium salegens

Bacterium

Salegentibacter salegens is a bacterium from the genus of Salegentibacter.
