= Salegentibacter sediminis =

Scientific classification
- Domain: Bacteria
- Kingdom: Pseudomonadati
- Phylum: Bacteroidota
- Class: Flavobacteriia
- Order: Flavobacteriales
- Family: Flavobacteriaceae
- Genus: Salegentibacter
- Species: S. sediminis

Binomial name
- Salegentibacter sediminis Liang et al. 2018

Type strain
- K5023

Bacterium

Salegentibacter sediminis is a Gram-negative, aerobic, rod-shaped and non-motile bacterium from the genus of Salegentibacter which has been isolated from sediment obtained from the coast of Weihai.
