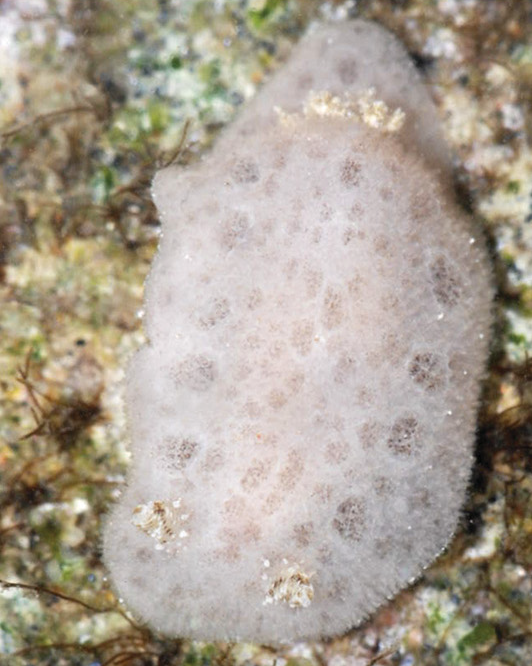

Scientific classification
- Kingdom: Animalia
- Phylum: Mollusca
- Class: Gastropoda
- Order: Nudibranchia
- Family: Discodorididae
- Genus: Jorunna
- Species: J. ramicola

Binomial name
- Jorunna ramicola M. C. Miller, 1996

= Jorunna ramicola =

Species of gastropod

Jorunna ramicola is a species of sea slug, a dorid nudibranch, a shell-less marine gastropod mollusc in the family Discodorididae.

== Distribution ==
This species was described from New Zealand. It has been reported from SE Australia.
