= Salegentibacter chungangensis =

Scientific classification
- Domain: Bacteria
- Kingdom: Pseudomonadati
- Phylum: Bacteroidota
- Class: Flavobacteriia
- Order: Flavobacteriales
- Family: Flavobacteriaceae
- Genus: Salegentibacter
- Species: S. chungangensis

Binomial name
- Salegentibacter chungangensis Siamphan and Kim 2014

Type strain
- CAU 1289

Bacterium

Salegentibacter chungangensis is a Gram-negative, strictly aerobic and rod-shaped bacterium from the genus of Salegentibacter which has been isolated from a marine sand.
