= Salegentibacter echinorum =

Scientific classification
- Domain: Bacteria
- Kingdom: Pseudomonadati
- Phylum: Bacteroidota
- Class: Flavobacteriia
- Order: Flavobacteriales
- Family: Flavobacteriaceae
- Genus: Salegentibacter
- Species: S. echinorum

Binomial name
- Salegentibacter echinorum Xia et al. 2014

Type strain
- HD4

Bacterium

Salegentibacter echinorum is a Gram-negative, heterotrophic, strictly aerobic and non-motile bacterium from the genus of Salegentibacter which has been isolated from a sea urchin (Hemicentrotus pulcherrimus) from the Yellow Sea in China.
