= Salegentibacter flavus =

Scientific classification
- Domain: Bacteria
- Kingdom: Pseudomonadati
- Phylum: Bacteroidota
- Class: Flavobacteriia
- Order: Flavobacteriales
- Family: Flavobacteriaceae
- Genus: Salegentibacter
- Species: S. flavus

Binomial name
- Salegentibacter flavus Ivanova et al. 2006

Type strain
- Fg 69

Bacterium

Salegentibacter flavus is a Gram-negative and non-motile bacterium from the genus of Salegentibacter which has been isolated from sediments from the Chazhma Bay.
