= Salegentibacter =

Scientific classification
- Domain: Bacteria
- Kingdom: Pseudomonadati
- Phylum: Bacteroidota
- Class: Flavobacteriia
- Order: Flavobacteriales
- Family: Flavobacteriaceae
- Genus: Salegentibacter; McCammon and Bowman 2000

Type species
- Salegentibacter salegens

Species
- S. agarivorans S. chungangensis S. echinorum S. flavus S. holothuriorum S. mishustinae S. salarius S. salegens S. salinarum S. sediminis

Bacterium

Salegentibacter is a genus of bacteria from the family of Flavobacteriaceae.
