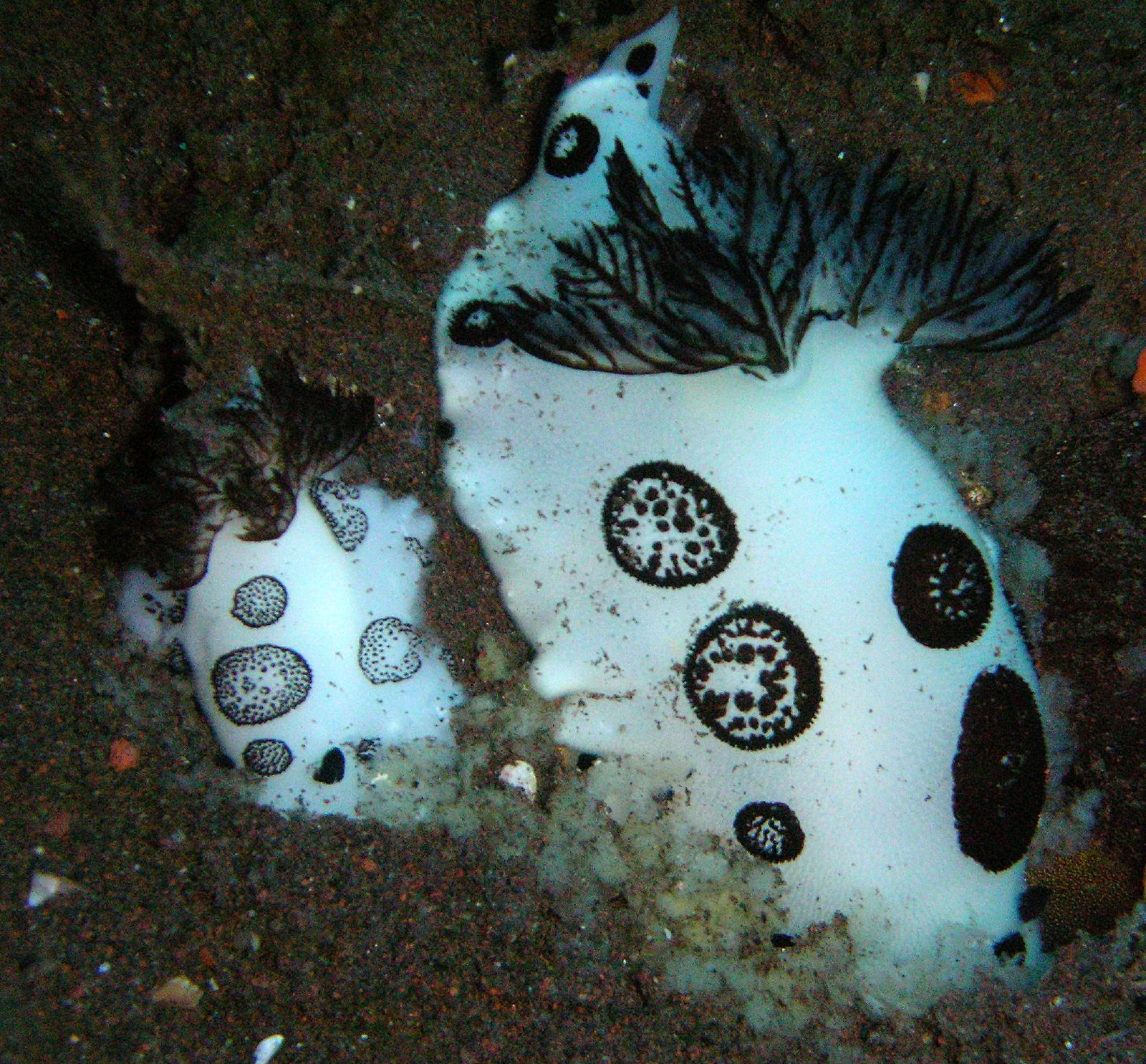

Scientific classification
- Domain: Eukaryota
- Kingdom: Animalia
- Phylum: Mollusca
- Class: Gastropoda
- Order: Nudibranchia
- Family: Discodorididae
- Genus: Jorunna
- Species: J. funebris

Binomial name
- Jorunna funebris (Kelaart, 1858)

Synonyms
- Discodoris wetleyi Allan, 1932; Doris funebris Kelaart, 1858 (basionym); Jorunna zania Ev. Marcus, 1976; Kentrodoris annuligera Bergh, 1876; Kentrodoris funebris (Kelaart, 1859); Kentrodoris gigas Bergh, 1876; Kentrodoris maculosa Eliot, 1906

= Jorunna funebris =

Species of gastropod

Jorunna funebris, commonly called the dotted nudibranch, is a species of sea slug. It is a dorid nudibranch, which is a shell-less marine gastropod mollusc in the family Discodorididae. The genus Jorunna is composed of roughly 15 other species of nudibranchs, which feed on a variety of sponges.

== Distribution ==
This species was described from Sri Lanka. It is widespread in the Indo-Pacific region from the Red Sea and the Indian Ocean along the East African coast to Australia, New Caledonia, and Hawaii. Jorunna funebris preys exclusively on sponges in the genus Xestospongia, and as such, the sea slug's distribution aligns closely with the distribution of Xestospongia.

== History ==
The species was first described as Doris funebris in 1858 by E.F. Kelaart in Sri Lanka, formerly called Ceylon. Kelaart described the nudibranch's appearance, egg mass appearance, and the behavior of a pair while laying eggs in an aquarium.^{[10]} Since then, there have been further observations of the species under different names, including Kentrodoris funebris, Kentrodoris annuligera, Kentrodoris maculosa, Discodoris wetleyi, and Jorunna zania.

== Chemistry of Jorunna funebris ==
This species contains a chemical compound called "jorumycin," which shares the same tetrahydroisoquinoline backbone as an anti-tumor drug called Zalypsis, or PM00104. In addition, another compound called jorunnamycin A, has been found alongside fennebricins A (1) and B (5), both of which are bis-tetrahydroisoquinolinequinones and related to two classes of anti-tumor alkaloids.
