= Salegentibacter holothuriorum =

Scientific classification
- Domain: Bacteria
- Kingdom: Pseudomonadati
- Phylum: Bacteroidota
- Class: Flavobacteriia
- Order: Flavobacteriales
- Family: Flavobacteriaceae
- Genus: Salegentibacter
- Species: S. holothuriorum

Binomial name
- Salegentibacter holothuriorum Nedashkovskaya et al. 2004

Type strain
- KMM 3524

Bacterium

Salegentibacter holothuriorum is a Gram-negative, strictly aerobic and non-motile bacterium from the genus of Salegentibacter which has been isolated from the sea cucumber Apostichopus japonicus from the Sea of Japan.
