= Pandaros acanthifolium =

Scientific classification
- Kingdom: Animalia
- Phylum: Porifera
- Class: Demospongiae
- Order: Poecilosclerida
- Family: Microcionidae
- Subfamily: Microcioninae
- Genus: Pandaros; Duchassaing & Michelotti, 1864
- Species: P. acanthifolium

Binomial name
- Pandaros acanthifolium Duchassaing & Michelotti, 1864

Species of sponge

Pandaros is a genus of demosponge in the family Microcionidae. It contains the single species, Pandaros acanthifolium.
