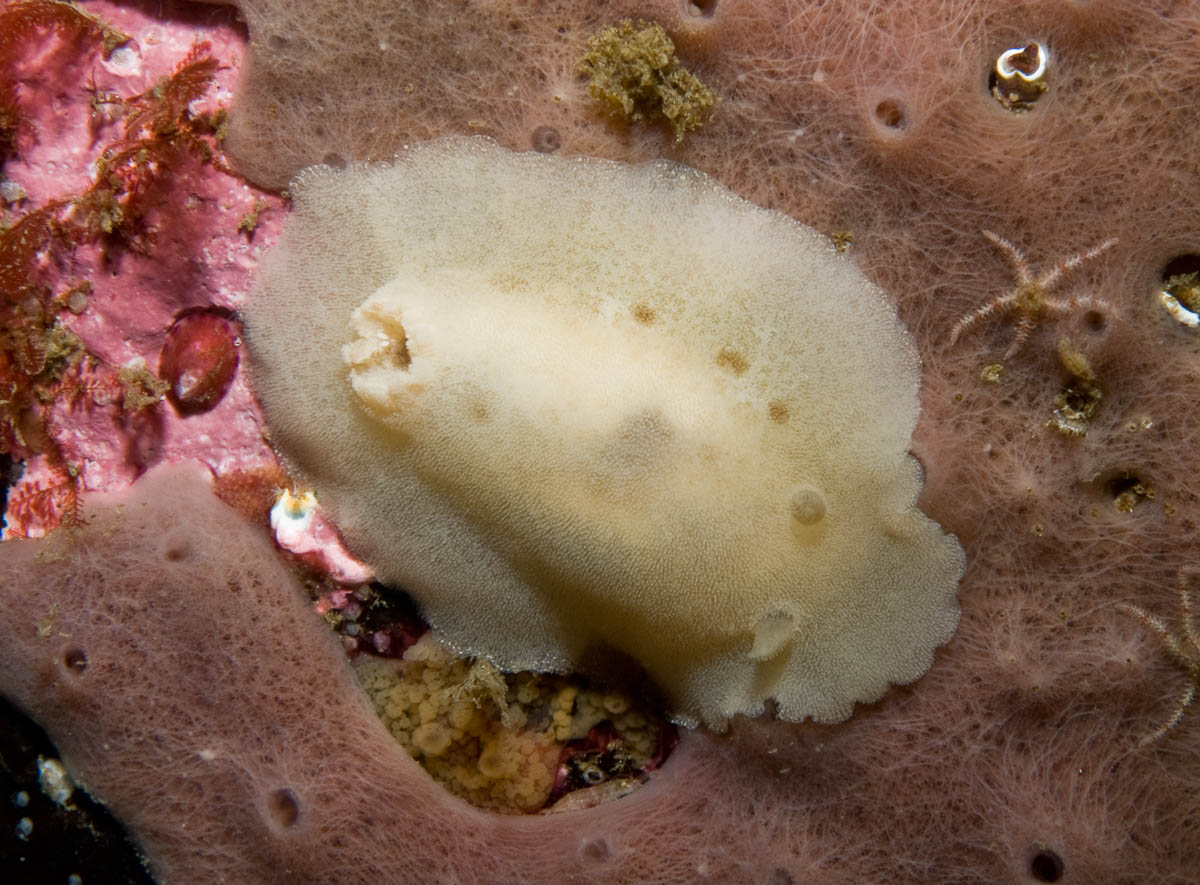
- The nudibranch Jorunna tomentosa feeding on the sponge Haliclona cinerea, Rosehearty, Moray Firth, Scotland.

Scientific classification
- Domain: Eukaryota
- Kingdom: Animalia
- Phylum: Mollusca
- Class: Gastropoda
- Order: Nudibranchia
- Family: Discodorididae
- Genus: Jorunna
- Species: J. tomentosa

Binomial name
- Jorunna tomentosa (Cuvier, 1804)

Synonyms
- Doris johnstoni Alder & Hancock, 1845; Doris obvelata Johnston, 1838; Doris tomentosa Cuvier, 1804 (basionym); Jorunna johnstoni (Alder & Hancock, 1845)

= Jorunna tomentosa =

Species of gastropod

Jorunna tomentosa is a species of sea slug, a dorid nudibranch, a shell-less marine gastropod mollusc in the family Discodorididae.

== Distribution ==
This species occurs in European waters from Norway to Portugal and in the Mediterranean Sea. It has also been reported from South Africa and Tristan da Cunha.

== Biology ==
Jorunna tomentosa feeds on the sponges Haliclona cinerea and Haliclona oculata.
