= Salegentibacter salarius =

Scientific classification
- Domain: Bacteria
- Kingdom: Pseudomonadati
- Phylum: Bacteroidota
- Class: Flavobacteriia
- Order: Flavobacteriales
- Family: Flavobacteriaceae
- Genus: Salegentibacter
- Species: S. salarius

Binomial name
- Salegentibacter salarius Yoon et al. 2007

Type strain
- ISL-6

Synonyms
- Salegentibacter salinus

Bacterium

Salegentibacter salarius is a Gram-negative, rod-shaped and non-motile bacterium from the genus of Salegentibacter which has been isolated from a marine solar saltern from the Yellow Sea.
