= Jorunna efe =

Scientific classification
- Domain: Eukaryota
- Kingdom: Animalia
- Phylum: Mollusca
- Class: Gastropoda
- Order: Nudibranchia
- Family: Discodorididae
- Genus: Jorunna
- Species: J. efe

Binomial name
- Jorunna efe Ortea, Moro & Caballer, 2014

Species of gastropod

Jorunna efe is a species of sea slug, a dorid nudibranch, a shell-less marine gastropod mollusc in the family Discodorididae.

== Distribution ==
This species was described from the Canary Islands.
