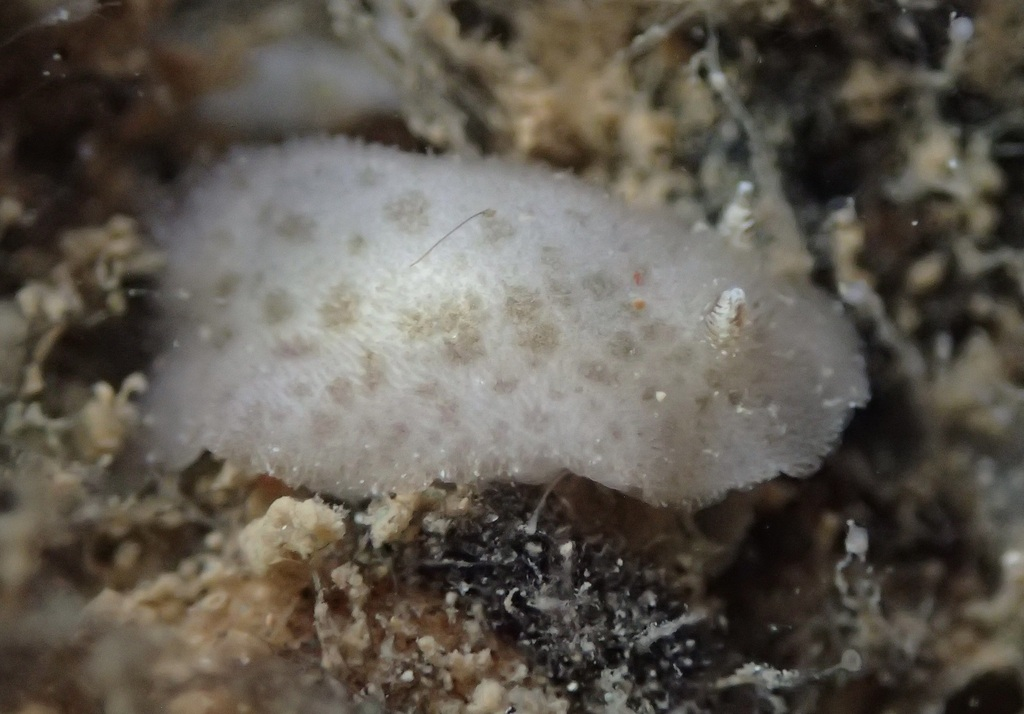

Scientific classification
- Kingdom: Animalia
- Phylum: Mollusca
- Class: Gastropoda
- Order: Nudibranchia
- Family: Discodorididae
- Genus: Jorunna
- Species: J. osae

Binomial name
- Jorunna osae Camacho-Garcia & Gosliner, 2008

= Jorunna osae =

Species of gastropod

Jorunna osae is a species of sea slug, a dorid nudibranch, a shell-less marine gastropod mollusc in the family Discodorididae.

== Etymology ==
Jorunna osae is named after the Osa Conservation Area in Costa Rica.

== Distribution ==
This species was described from Playa Gallardo, Golfito, Osa Conservation Area, Costa Rica, Pacific Ocean. Additional specimens from Tempisque Conservation Area and Osa Conservation Area are listed in the original description. Most of the specimens are from the intertidal region with one from 9–13 m depth.

== Description ==
Jorunna osae is a pale brown Jorunna with darker oval markings. It is reported to reach 8 mm in length.
