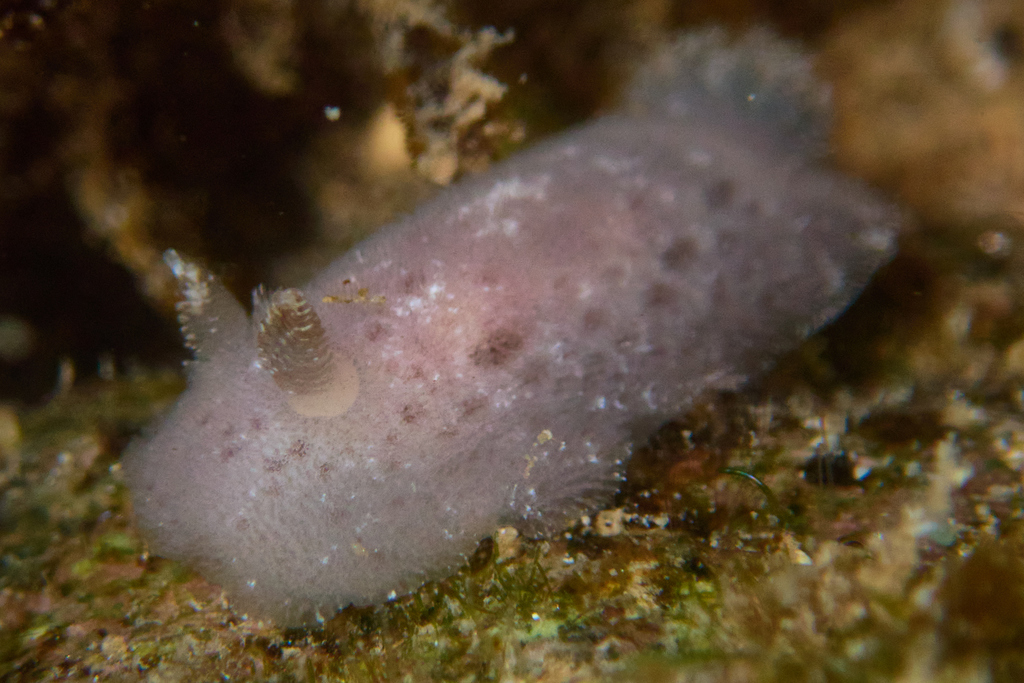

Scientific classification
- Kingdom: Animalia
- Phylum: Mollusca
- Class: Gastropoda
- Order: Nudibranchia
- Family: Discodorididae
- Genus: Jorunna
- Species: J. alisonae

Binomial name
- Jorunna alisonae Ev. Marcus, 1976

= Jorunna alisonae =

Species of gastropod

Jorunna alisonae is a species of sea slug, a dorid nudibranch, a shell-less marine gastropod mollusc in the family Discodorididae.

== Distribution ==
This species was described from Hawaii. Previously identified with the European Jorunna tomentosa.

== Biology ==
Jorunna alisonae is a common species usually found in the intertidal zone or shallow depths at protected to moderately exposed rocky sites. It feeds on the violet-brown sponge Haliclona permollis.
