= Jorunna glandulosa =

Scientific classification
- Domain: Eukaryota
- Kingdom: Animalia
- Phylum: Mollusca
- Class: Gastropoda
- Order: Nudibranchia
- Family: Discodorididae
- Genus: Jorunna
- Species: J. glandulosa

Binomial name
- Jorunna glandulosa Edmunds, 2011

Species of gastropod

Jorunna glandulosa is a species of sea slug, a dorid nudibranch, a shell-less marine gastropod mollusc in the family Discodorididae.

== Distribution ==
This species was described from Ghana.
