= Jorunna onubensis =

Scientific classification
- Kingdom: Animalia
- Phylum: Mollusca
- Class: Gastropoda
- Order: Nudibranchia
- Family: Discodorididae
- Genus: Jorunna
- Species: J. onubensis

Binomial name
- Jorunna onubensis Cervera, Garcia & Garcia, 1986

Species of gastropod

Jorunna onubensis is a species of sea slug, a dorid nudibranch, a shell-less marine gastropod mollusc in the family Discodorididae.

== Distribution ==
This species was described from Portil, Huelva, Spain.
