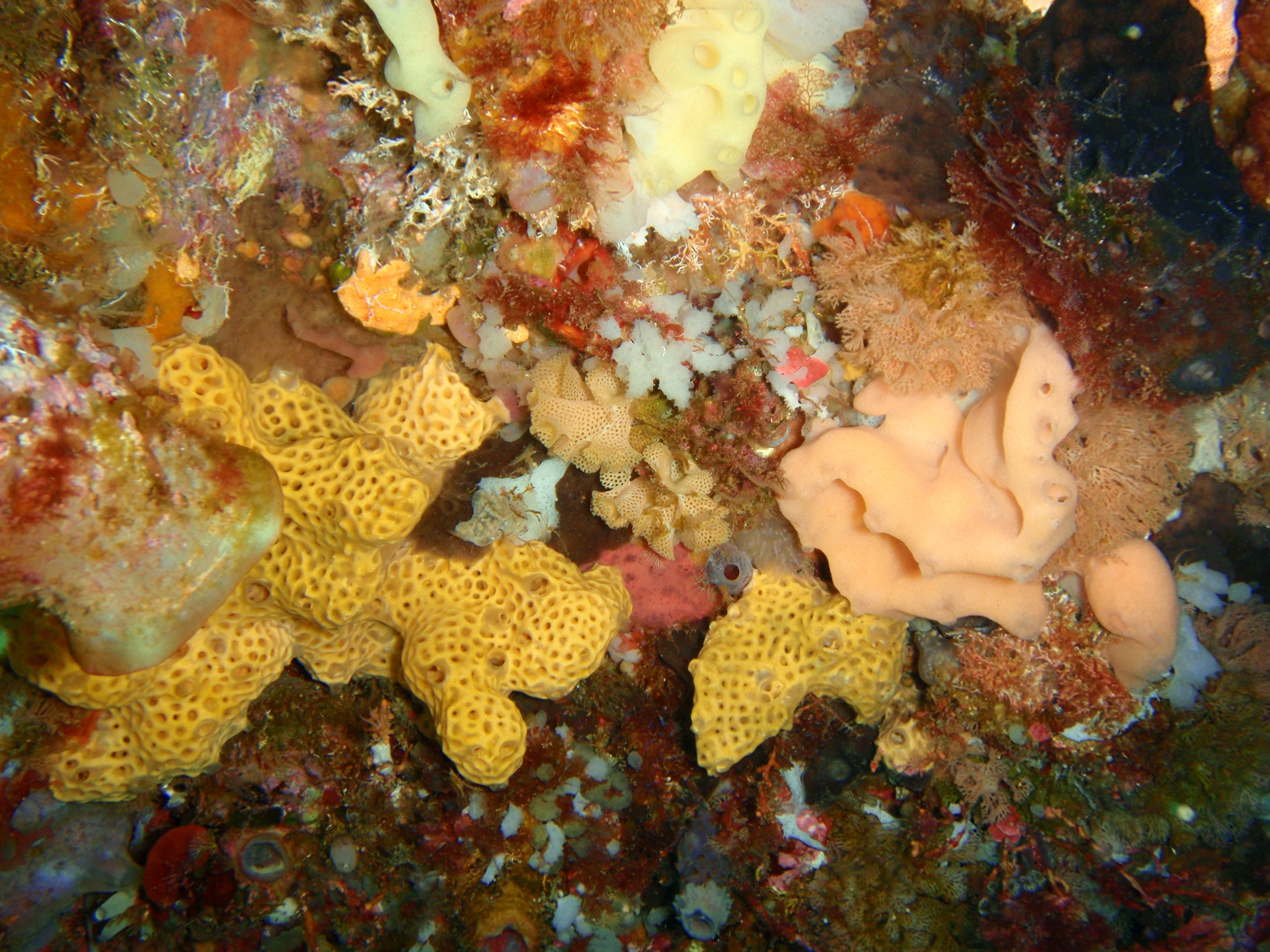
- Holopsamma arborea at Breaksea Cove in King George Sound, Western Australia

Scientific classification
- Kingdom: Animalia
- Phylum: Porifera
- Class: Demospongiae
- Order: Poecilosclerida
- Family: Microcionidae
- Genus: Holopsamma; Carter, 1885

= Holopsamma =

Genus of sponges

Holopsamma is a genus of sponges belonging to the family Microcionidae.

The species of this genus are found in Australia and Central America.

Species:

- Holopsamma arborea (Lendenfeld, 1888)
- Holopsamma crassa Carter, 1885
- Holopsamma elegans (Lendenfeld, 1888)
- Holopsamma favus (Carter, 1885)
- Holopsamma laminaefavosa Carter, 1885
- Holopsamma macropora (Lendenfeld, 1888)
- Holopsamma pluritoxa (Pulitzer-Finali, 1982)
- Holopsamma ramosa (Hallmann, 1912)
- Holopsamma rotunda (Hallmann, 1912)
- Holopsamma simplex (Lendenfeld, 1886)
