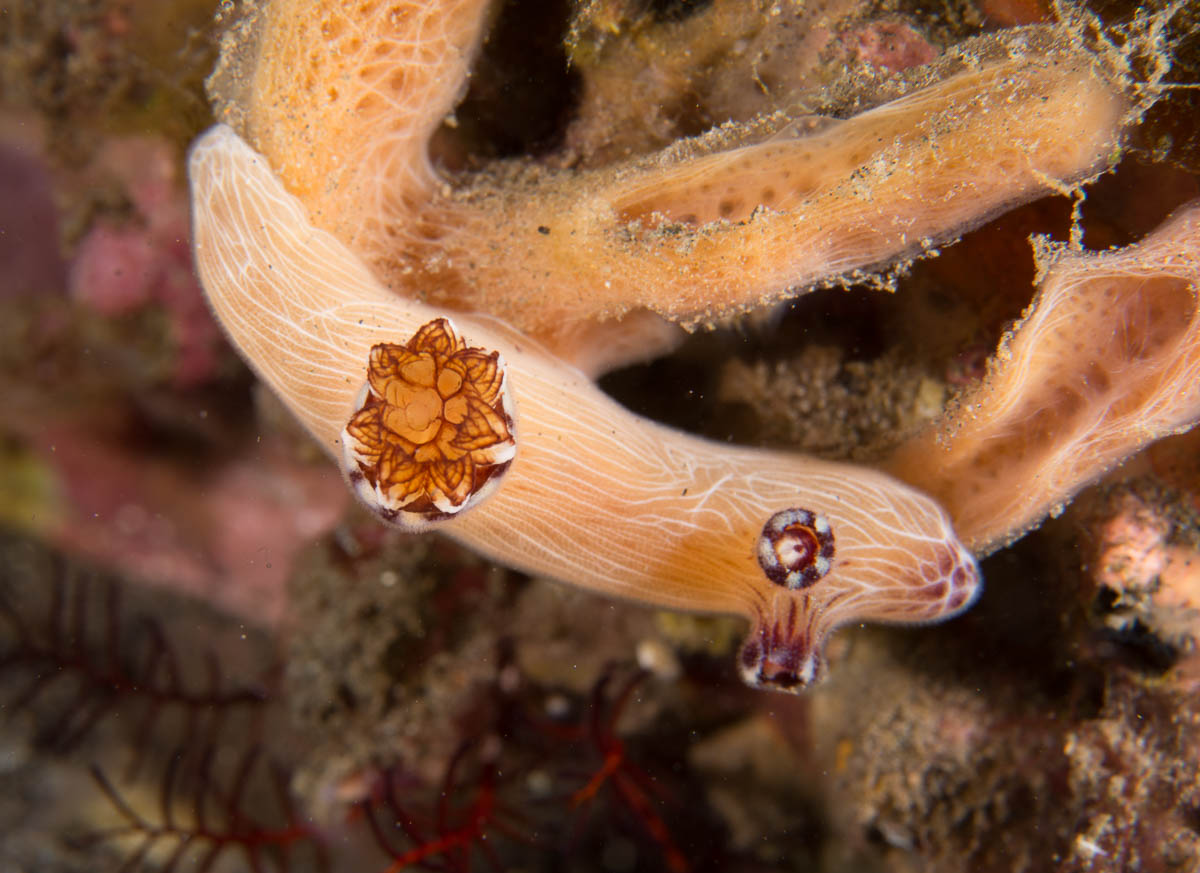
- The nudibranch Jorunna rubescens, Bontoh, Sangeang, Indonesia.

Scientific classification
- Kingdom: Animalia
- Phylum: Mollusca
- Class: Gastropoda
- Order: Nudibranchia
- Family: Discodorididae
- Genus: Jorunna
- Species: J. rubescens

Binomial name
- Jorunna rubescens (Bergh, 1876)

Synonyms
- Kentrodoris rubescens Bergh, 1876

= Jorunna rubescens =

Species of gastropod

Jorunna rubescens is a species of sea slug, a dorid nudibranch, a shell-less marine gastropod mollusc in the family Discodorididae.

== Distribution ==
This species was described from the Philippines.
