= Salegentibacter salinarum =

Scientific classification
- Domain: Bacteria
- Kingdom: Pseudomonadati
- Phylum: Bacteroidota
- Class: Flavobacteriia
- Order: Flavobacteriales
- Family: Flavobacteriaceae
- Genus: Salegentibacter
- Species: S. salinarum

Binomial name
- Salegentibacter salinarum Yoon et al. 2008

Type strain
- ISL-4

Synonyms
- Salegentibacter locisalis

Bacterium

Salegentibacter salinarum is a Gram-negative, rod-shaped and non-motile bacterium from the genus of Salegentibacter which has been isolated from a marine solar saltern from the Yellow Sea.
