= Rostanga anthelia =

Scientific classification
- Kingdom: Animalia
- Phylum: Mollusca
- Class: Gastropoda
- Order: Nudibranchia
- Family: Discodorididae
- Genus: Rostanga
- Species: R. anthelia

Binomial name
- Rostanga anthelia Perrone, 1991

Species of gastropod

Rostanga anthelia is a species of sea slug, a dorid nudibranch, a marine gastropod mollusc in the family Discodorididae.

== Distribution ==
This species was described from Malta in the Mediterranean Sea. It has also been reported from Apulia, in southern Italy.

== Description ==
This dorid nudibranch is reddish-brown in colour, and the dorsum is covered with caryophyllidia. The rhinophores and gills are heavily pigmented with white, and there are small, regularly placed, white patches at the mantle edge.
