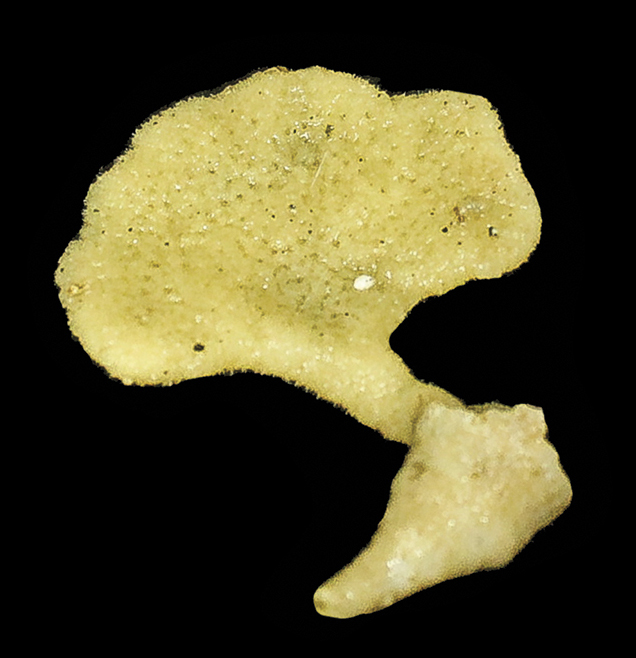
- Antho (plocamia) bremecae

Scientific classification
- Kingdom: Animalia
- Phylum: Porifera
- Class: Demospongiae
- Order: Poecilosclerida
- Family: Microcionidae
- Genus: Antho (Gray, 1867)

Subgenera and species
- See text

Synonyms
- Acarnia (Gray, 1867); Anomoclathria (Topsent, 1929); Clathriella (Burton, 1935); Dirrhopalum (Ridley, 1881); Dyctioclathria (Ferrer-Hernandez, 1921); Echinoplocamia (Burton, 1959); Heteroclathria (Topsent, 1904); Isociona (Hallmann, 1920); Isopenectya (Hallmann, 1920); Lissoplocamia Brøndsted, 1924; Placomia; Plocamiopsis (Topsent, 1904); Protoclathria (Burton, 1932); Quintoxilla (de Laubenfels, 1950); Quizciona (de Laubenfels, 1936)

= Antho =

Genus of sponges

Antho is a genus of sponges belonging to the family Microcionidae. The genus has a cosmopolitan distribution and is known from virtually all parts of the global ocean. There are 62 species in five subgenera.

== Species ==
The following species are recognised:

Subgenus Antho (Acarnia) (Gray, 1867)

- Antho (Acarnia) arctica (Koltun, 1959)
- Antho (Acarnia) bakusi (Sim & Lee, 1998)
- Antho (Acarnia) circonflexa (Lévi, 1960)
- Antho (Acarnia) coriacea (Bowerbank, 1874)
- Antho (Acarnia) elegans (Ridley & Dendy, 1887)
- Antho (Acarnia) frondifera (Lamarck, 1814)
- Antho (Acarnia) illgi (Bakus, 1966)
- Antho (Acarnia) inconspicua (Desqueyroux, 1972)
- Antho (Acarnia) kellyae (Samaai & Gibbons, 2005)
- Antho (Acarnia) levii (Bergquist & Fromont, 1988)
- Antho (Acarnia) pellita (Van Soest, Meesters & Becking, 2014)
- Antho (Acarnia) penneyi (Laubenfels, 1936)
- Antho (Acarnia) planoramosa (Koltun, 1962)
- Antho (Acarnia) prima (Brøndsted, 1924)
- Antho (Acarnia) ridgwayi (Stone, Lehnert & Hoff, 2019)
- Antho (Acarnia) ridleyi (Hentschel, 1912)
- Antho (Acarnia) signata (Topsent, 1904)
- Antho (Acarnia) simplicissima (Burton, 1932)
- Antho (Acarnia) spinulosa (Tanita, 1968)

Subgenus Antho (Antho) (Gray, 1867)

- Antho (Antho) arcitenens (Topsent, 1892)
- Antho (Antho) atlantidae (Van Soest, Beglinger & De Voogd, 2013)
- Antho (Antho) barbadensis (van Soest, 1984)
- Antho (Antho) brondstedi (Bergquist & Fromont, 1988)
- Antho (Antho) burtoni (Lévi, 1952)
- Antho (Antho) dichotoma (Linnaeus, 1767)
- Antho (Antho) graceae (Bakus, 1966)
- Antho (Antho) granditoxa (Picton & Goodwin, 2007)
- Antho (Antho) heterospiculata (Brøndsted, 1924)
- Antho (Antho) inconstans (Topsent, 1925)
- Antho (Antho) involvens (Schmidt, 1864)
- Antho (Antho) mediterranea (Babiç, 1922)
- Antho (Antho) morisca (Schmidt, 1868)
- Antho (Antho) nuda (Van Soest, Beglinger & De Voogd, 2013)
- Antho (Antho) opuntioides (Lamarck, 1815)
- Antho (Antho) oxeifera (Ferrer-Hernandez, 1921)
- Antho (Antho) paradoxa (Babiç, 1922)
- Antho (Antho) paucispina (Sarà & Siribelli, 1962)
- Antho (Antho) tuberosa (Hentschel, 1911)

Subgenus Antho (Isopenectya) (Hallmann, 1920)

- Antho (Isopenectya) chartacea (Whitelegge, 1907)
- Antho (Isopenectya) primitiva (Burton, 1935)
- Antho (Isopenectya) punicea (Hooper, 1996)
- Antho (Isopenectya) saintvincenti (Hooper, 1996)

Subgenus Antho (Jia) (Laubenfels, 1930)

- Antho (Jia) brattegardi (van Soest & Stone, 1986)
- Antho (Jia) galapagosensis (Van Soest, Rützler & Sim, 2016)
- Antho (Jia) jia (Laubenfels, 1930)
- Antho (Jia) lithisticola (Van Soest, Rützler & Sim, 2016)
- Antho (Jia) lithophoenix (de Laubenfels, 1927)
- Antho (Jia) ramosa (Van Soest, Rützler & Sim, 2016)
- Antho (Jia) wunschorum (Van Soest, Rützler & Sim, 2016)

Subgenus Antho (Plocamia) (Schmidt, 1870)

- Antho (Plocamia) anisotyla (Lévi, 1960)
- Antho (Plocamia) arbuscula (Burton, 1959)
- Antho (Plocamia) bremecae (Schejter, Bertolino & Calcinai, 2017)
- Antho (Plocamia) erecta (Ferrer Hernández, 1923)
- Antho (Plocamia) gymnazusa (Schmidt, 1870)
- Antho (Plocamia) hallezi (Topsent, 1904)
- Antho (Plocamia) karykina (de Laubenfels, 1927)
- Antho (Plocamia) karyoka (Dickinson, 1945)
- Antho (Plocamia) lambei (Burton, 1935)
- Antho (Plocamia) manaarensis (Carter, 1880)
- Antho (Plocamia) novizelanica (Ridley & Duncan, 1881)
- Antho (Plocamia) sarasiri (Costa, Pansini & Bertolino, 2019)
