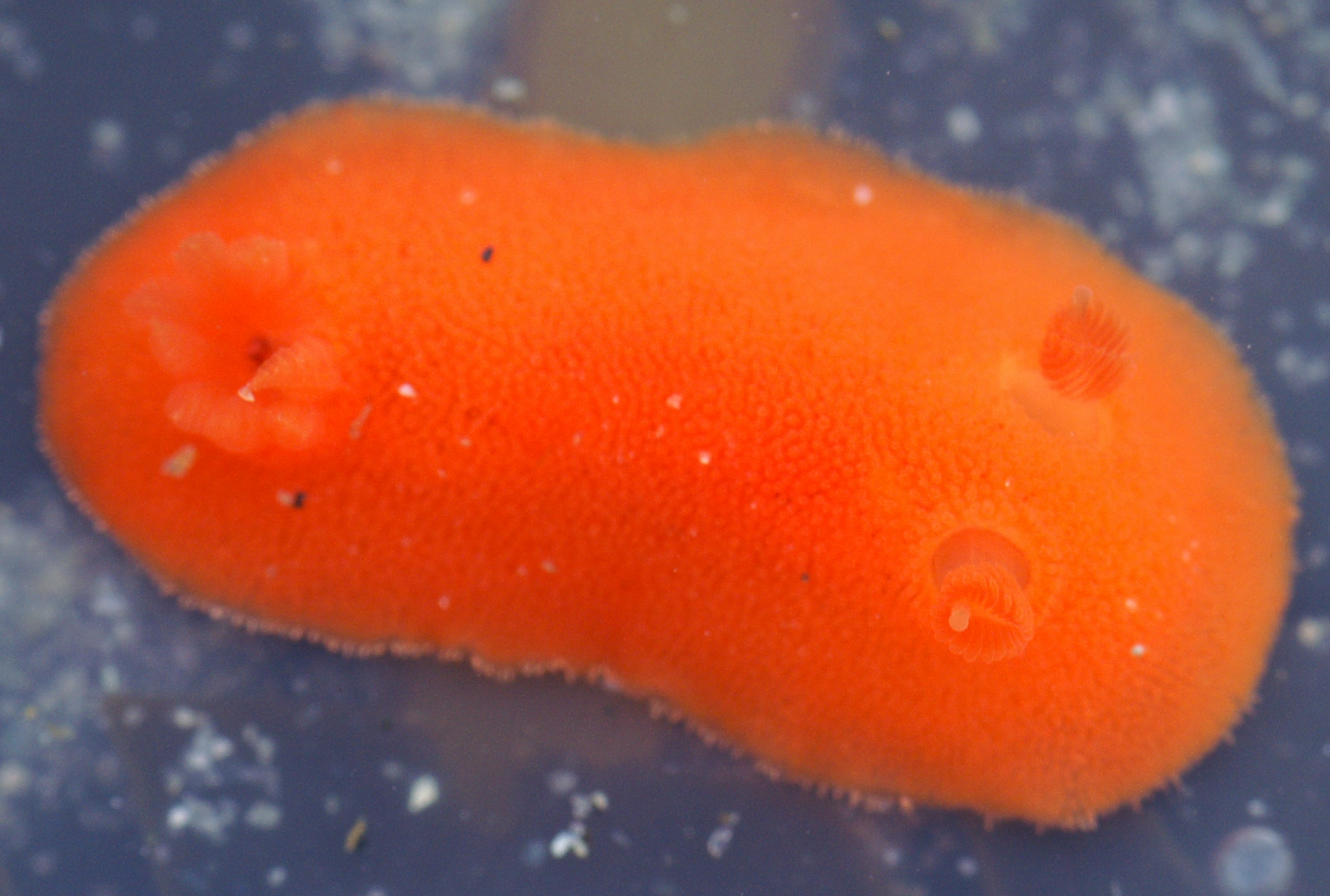
- A live individual of Rostanga pulchra, head end towards the right

Scientific classification
- Kingdom: Animalia
- Phylum: Mollusca
- Class: Gastropoda
- Order: Nudibranchia
- Family: Discodorididae
- Genus: Rostanga
- Species: R. pulchra

Binomial name
- Rostanga pulchra MacFarland, 1905

= Rostanga pulchra =

Species of gastropod

Rostanga pulchra is a species of sea slug, a dorid nudibranch, a shell-less marine gastropod mollusk in the family Discodorididae.

== Distribution ==
This is a well known species which has been reported on the Pacific Ocean coast of North, Central and South America from Point Craven, Alaska to the Gulf of California, Panama, Chile and Argentina.

== Description ==
Size up to 30 mm in length.

== Habitat ==
Found intertidally under boulders and in shallow water, normally feeding on the sponge Ophlitaspongia pennata.
