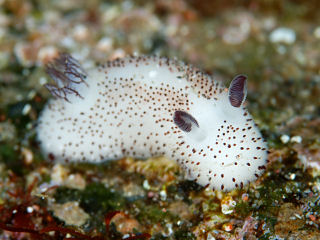

Scientific classification
- Kingdom: Animalia
- Phylum: Mollusca
- Class: Gastropoda
- Order: Nudibranchia
- Family: Discodorididae
- Genus: Jorunna
- Species: J. parva

Binomial name
- Jorunna parva (Baba, 1938)

Synonyms
- Thordisa parva Baba, 1938

= Jorunna parva =

Species of gastropod

Jorunna parva, commonly known as the sea bunny, is a species of nudibranch, a shell-less marine gastropod mollusc in the family Discodorididae. The species was first described by Kikutaro Baba. Due to its resemblance to a rabbit, there was an increase in the popularity of the species on Twitter throughout Japan in 2015.

== Description ==
The species is up to 2.5 cm or one inch long. Its black-and-white rhinophores somewhat resemble a rabbit's ears. Its external gills are located near its rear. Its body is covered in papillae, fleshy protuberances used for sensory functions, giving it the appearance of a furry animal. There are multiple colorations of Jorunna parva, including yellow, white, and green, though the latter is rarely photographed. All of these variants have black papillae interspersed among papillae of their main color. There is controversy over whether or not the different colorations are divergent species.

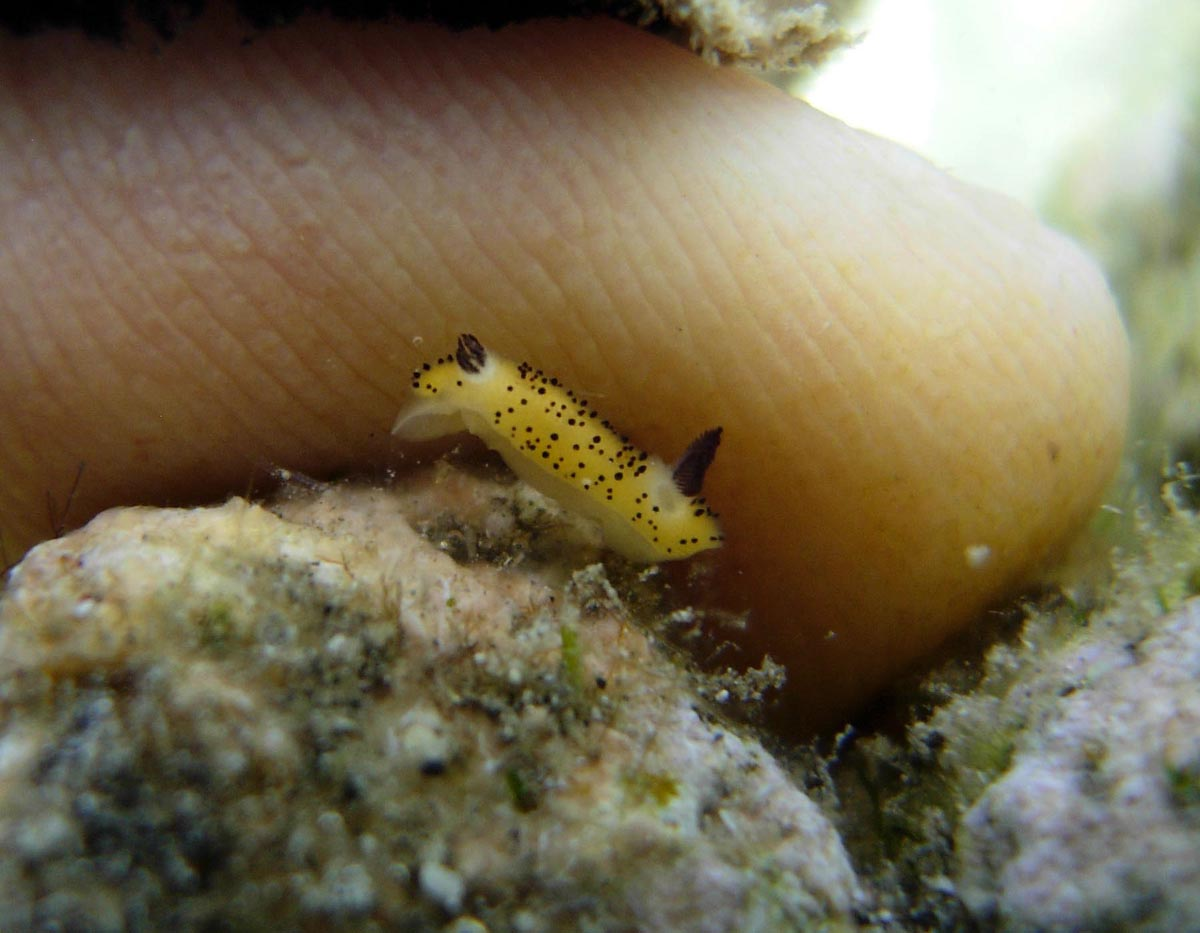
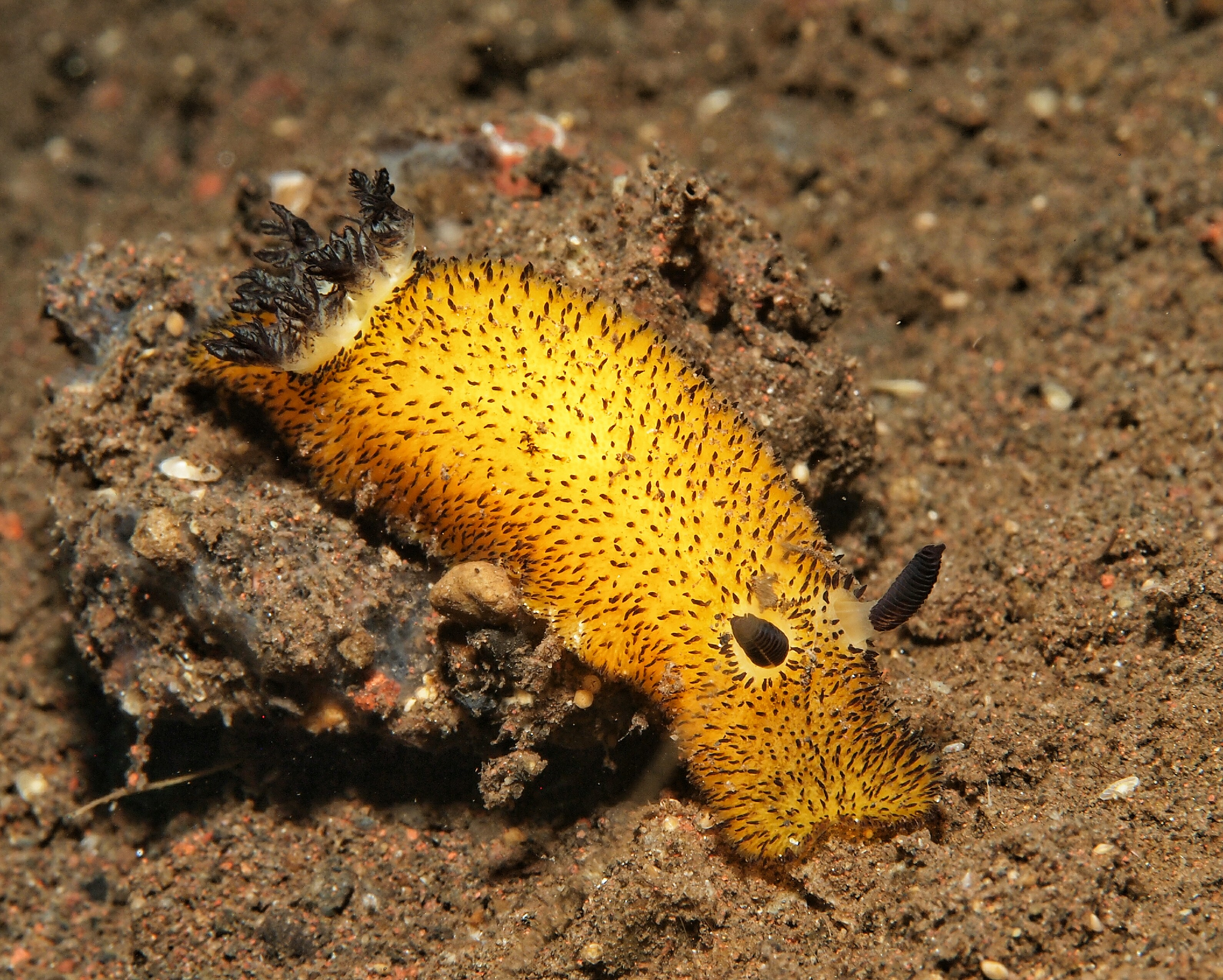

Like most other members of its genus, Jorunna parva's diet consists of toxic sponges in the family Chalinidae. However, they are also known to eat algae, seagrass, and other small creatures, such as sea slugs or sea snails. As the sea bunny feeds on sea sponges, they process the toxins and store them as a defense mechanism.

Jorunna parva are hermaphrodites, meaning they produce both sperm and egg cells. They cannot fertilize the eggs themselves.

== Distribution ==
This species was described from Kii Province, Japan. Jorunna parva has subsequently been reported from the Philippines, Tanzania, Papua New Guinea, Seychelles and Réunion but there are some doubts as to whether it is really a species complex. The Jorunna parva are concentrated in areas where there is an abundance of food and where resources are easily acquired. They often cling to submerged vegetation and spend the majority of the time at the bottom of tropical waters.
