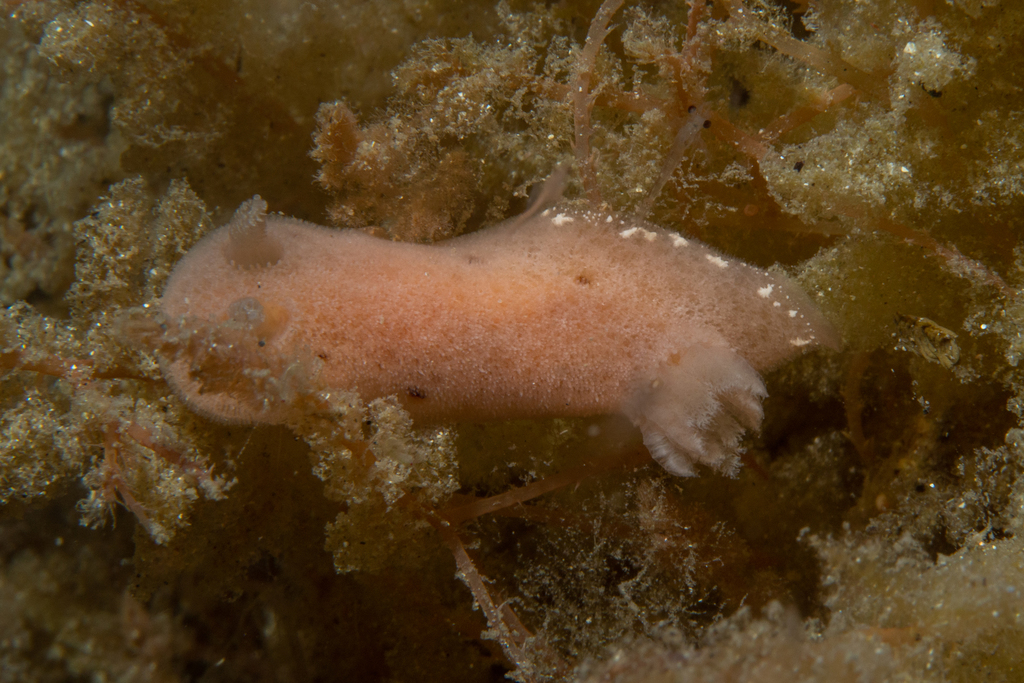

Scientific classification
- Kingdom: Animalia
- Phylum: Mollusca
- Class: Gastropoda
- Order: Nudibranchia
- Family: Discodorididae
- Genus: Jorunna
- Species: J. hartleyi

Binomial name
- Jorunna hartleyi (Burn, 1958)

Synonyms
- Rostanga hartleyi Burn, 1958

= Jorunna hartleyi =

Species of gastropod

Jorunna hartleyi is a species of sea slug, a dorid nudibranch, a shell-less marine gastropod mollusc in the family Discodorididae.

== Distribution ==
This species was described from northwestern Kawau Island, Victoria, Australia. It is reported from Tasmania.
