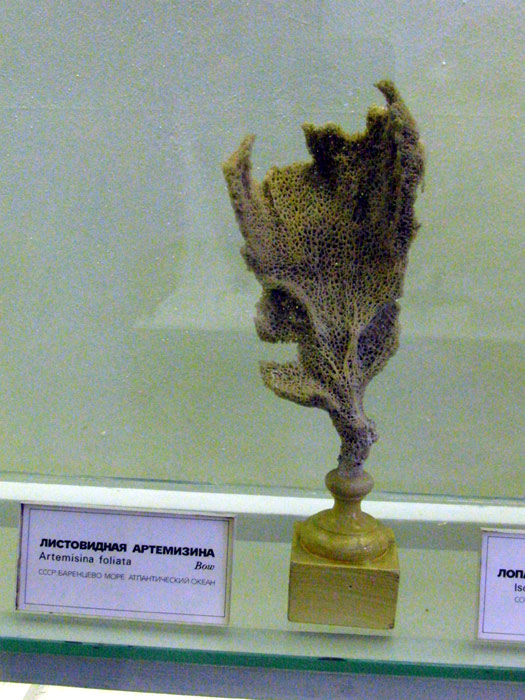
- Artemisina foliata

Scientific classification
- Kingdom: Animalia
- Phylum: Porifera
- Class: Demospongiae
- Order: Poecilosclerida
- Family: Microcionidae
- Genus: Artemisina; Vosmaer, 1885

= Artemisina =

Genus of sponges

Artemisina is a genus of sponges belonging to the family Microcionidae.

The genus has cosmopolitan distribution.

Species:

- Artemisina amlia Lehnert, Stone & Heimler, 2006
- Artemisina apollinis (Ridley & Dendy, 1886)
- Artemisina archegona Ristau, 1978
