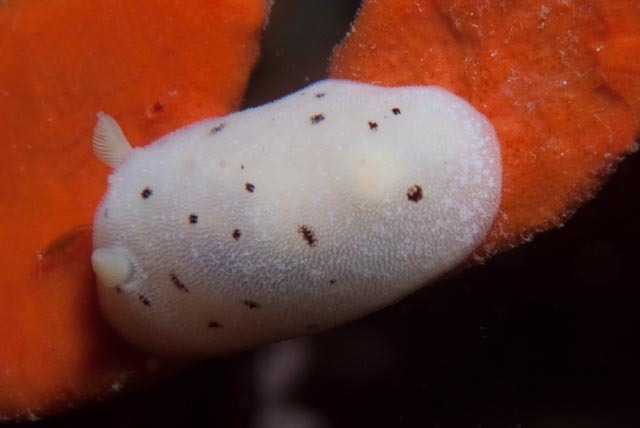

Scientific classification
- Kingdom: Animalia
- Phylum: Mollusca
- Class: Gastropoda
- Order: Nudibranchia
- Family: Discodorididae
- Genus: Rostanga
- Species: R. phepha

Binomial name
- Rostanga phepha Garovoy, Valdes & Gosliner, 2001

= Rostanga phepha =

Species of gastropod

Rostanga phepha, is a species of sea slug, a dorid nudibranch, a marine gastropod mollusc in the family Discodorididae.

== Distribution ==
This species has so far only been found around the southern African coast, from the Atlantic side of the Cape Peninsula. This nudibranch appears to be endemic to South Africa.

== Description ==
Distinctively different to other Rostanga species, this animal has a white notum with elongate, scattered, purple-brown spots.
