= Jorunna evansi =

Scientific classification
- Kingdom: Animalia
- Phylum: Mollusca
- Class: Gastropoda
- Order: Nudibranchia
- Family: Discodorididae
- Genus: Jorunna
- Species: J. evansi

Binomial name
- Jorunna evansi (Eliot, 1906)

Synonyms
- Jorunna luisae Ev. Marcus, 1976; Rostanga evansi Eliot, 1906

Species of gastropod

Jorunna evansi is a species of sea slug, a dorid nudibranch, a shell-less marine gastropod mollusc in the family Discodorididae.

== Distribution ==
This species was described from the Cape Verde Islands.
