= Ophlitaspongia =

Scientific classification
- Domain: Eukaryota
- Kingdom: Animalia
- Phylum: Porifera
- Class: Demospongiae
- Order: Poecilosclerida
- Family: Microcionidae
- Genus: Ophlitaspongia; Bowerbank, 1866

Species
- See text

Synonyms
- Ophlitospongia [lapsus]

Genus of sponges

Ophlitaspongia is a genus of demosponges belonging to the family Microcionidae. Many species formerly included in this genus have been moved to other genera such as Clathria and Echinoclathria and the genus currently contains only two recognized species.

== Species ==
- Ophlitaspongia kildensis
- Ophlitaspongia papilla
