= Caryophyllidia =

Caryophyllidia are anatomical features of the external dorsal surface of dorid sea slugs. Caryophyllidia are sensory tubercles, surrounded by tiny needle-like structures called spicules, that are present on the outer mantle.
