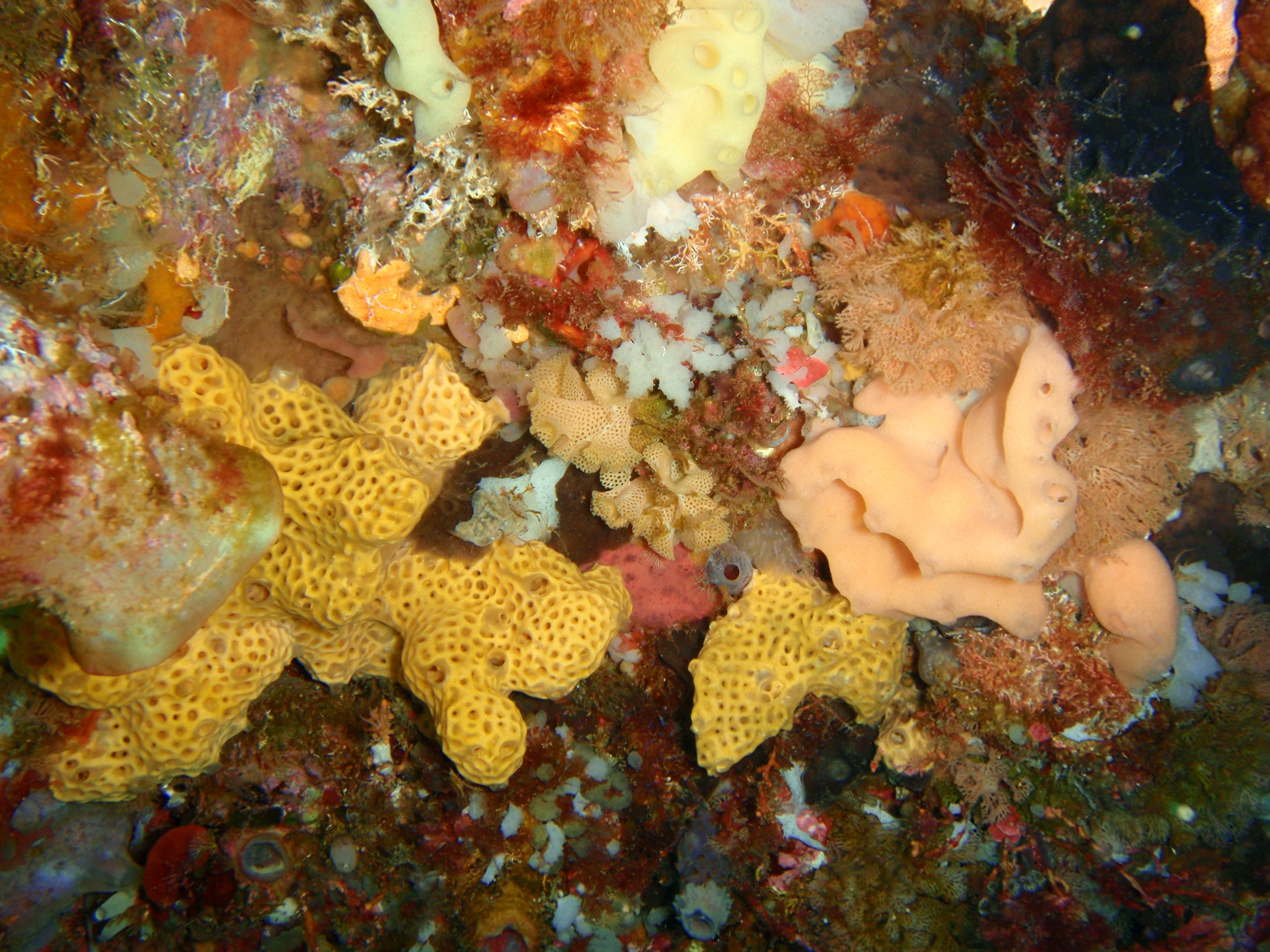
- Holopsamma arborea

Scientific classification
- Kingdom: Animalia
- Phylum: Porifera
- Class: Demospongiae
- Order: Poecilosclerida
- Family: Microcionidae; Carter, 1875

Genera
- 9, See text.

Synonyms
- Acarniidae Laubenfels, 1936; Clathriidae Lendenfeld, 1884

= Microcionidae =

Family of sponges

Microcionidae is a family of marine demosponges.

== Subdivisions ==
The following genera are recognized within the family Microcionidae:

- Subfamily Microcioninae Carter 1875
  - Clathria Schmidt, 1862
  - Echinochalina Thiele, 1903
  - Holopsamma Carter, 1885
  - Pandaros Duchassaing & Michelotti, 1864
- Subfamily Ophlitaspongiinae de Laubenfels, 1936
  - Antho Gray, 1867
  - Artemisina Vosmaer, 1885
  - Echinoclathria Carter, 1885
  - Ophlitaspongia Bowerbank, 1866
  - Sigmeurypon Topsent, 1928
