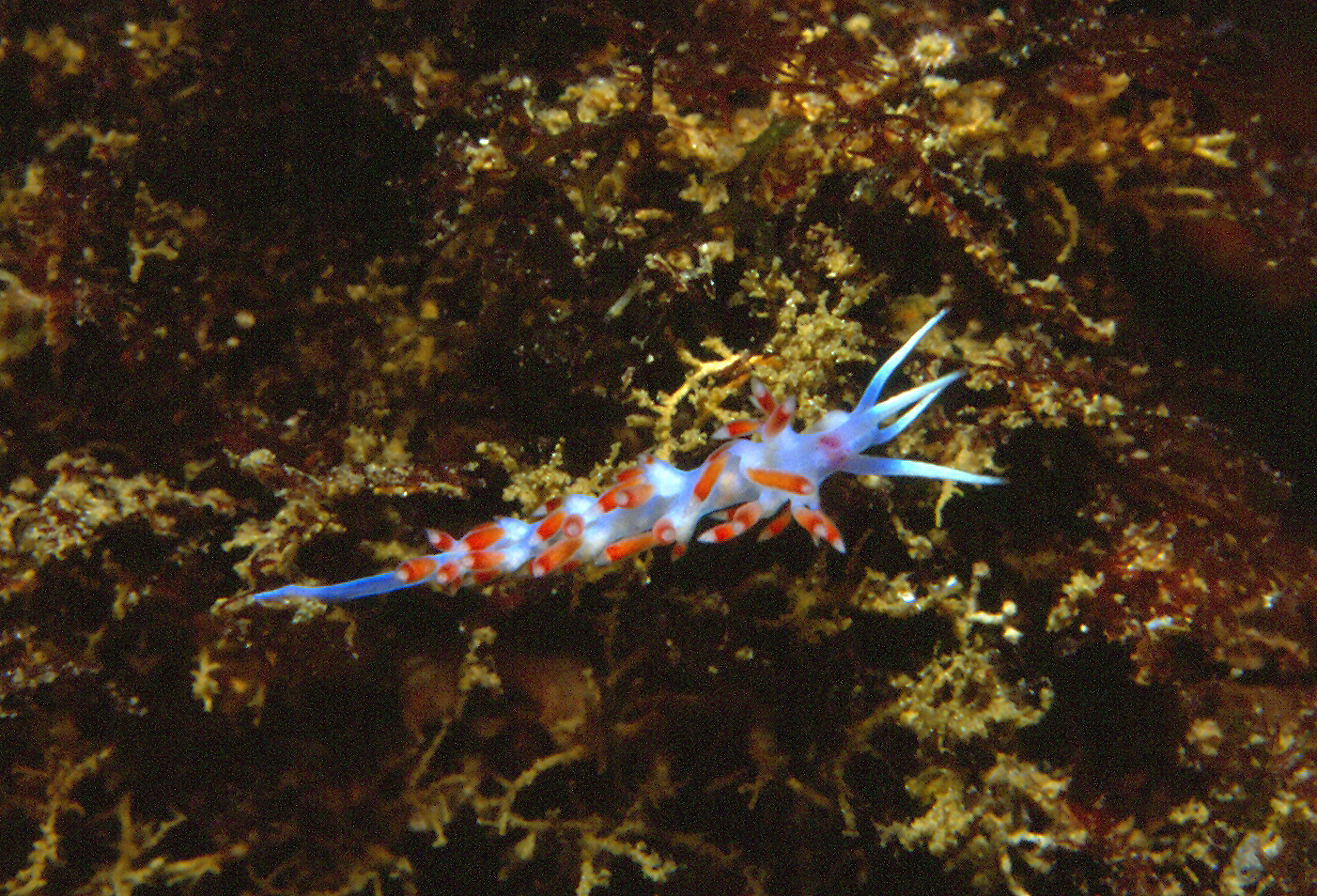
- Calmella cavolini (Vérany, 1846)

Scientific classification
- Kingdom: Animalia
- Phylum: Mollusca
- Class: Gastropoda
- Order: Nudibranchia
- Suborder: Aeolidacea
- Family: Flabellinidae
- Genus: Calmella; Eliot, 1910

Type species
- Calmella cavolini (Vérany, 1846)

Synonyms
- Jojenia Aradas, 1847

= Calmella =

Genus of gastropods

Calmella is a genus of sea slugs, aeolid nudibranchs, marine gastropod mollusks in the family Flabellinidae.

== Species ==
There are three species within the genus Calmella:

- Calmella bandeli Ev. Marcus, 1976
- Calmella cavolini (Vérany, 1846)
- Calmella gaditana (Cervera, García-Gomez & García, 1987)

Species transferred to other genera:

- Calmella sphaerifera Schmekel, 1965 transferred to genus Piseinotecus as Piseinotecus sphaeriferus (Schmekel, 1965)
