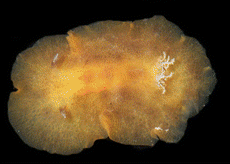
- Dorsal view of Geitodoris immunda

Scientific classification
- Kingdom: Animalia
- Phylum: Mollusca
- Class: Gastropoda
- Order: Nudibranchia
- Family: Discodorididae
- Genus: Geitodoris
- Species: G. immunda

Binomial name
- Geitodoris immunda Bergh, 1894

= Geitodoris immunda =

Species of gastropod

Geitodoris immunda is a species of sea slug or dorid nudibranch, a marine gastropod mollusk in the family Discodorididae.

== Taxonomy ==
This species as well as Geitodoris planata are similar to Geitodoris pusae. Further review is necessary to clarify the taxonomic status of these taxa.

== Distribution ==
Distribution of Geitodoris immunda includes Gulf of Mexico, Costa Rica, Venezuela, Brazil and Panama.

== Description ==
The body is oval. Mantle is moderately rigid. Dorsum is with a complex network of low ridges covering the entire surface, with some conical tubercles at the intersections. Branchial sheaths are with characteristic wavy edges. Background color is grayish-brown with numerous opaque white dots and some darker brown areas. Rhinophores and gill are brown with white tips. The maximum recorded body length is 43 mm.

== Ecology ==
It was found under coral rubble in a reef habitat in Panama. Minimum recorded depth is 5.5 m. Maximum recorded depth is 5.5 m.
