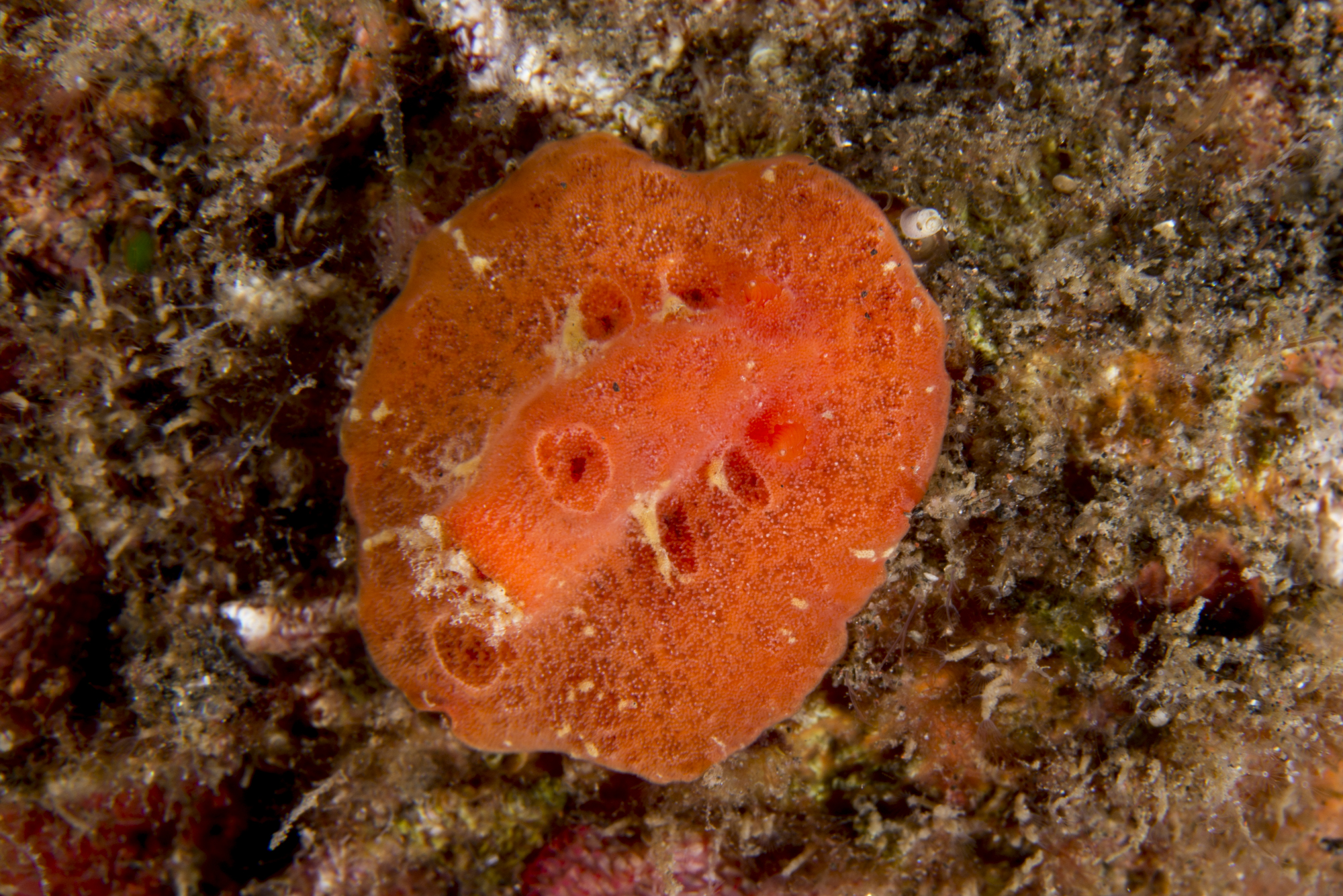
- Sclerodoris tuberculata

Scientific classification
- Kingdom: Animalia
- Phylum: Mollusca
- Class: Gastropoda
- Order: Nudibranchia
- Family: Discodorididae
- Genus: Sclerodoris; Eliot, 1904

= Sclerodoris =

Genus of gastropods

Sclerodoris is a genus of sea slugs, specifically dorid nudibranchs. They are marine gastropod molluscs in the family Discodorididae.

== Species ==
Species so far described in this genus include:

- Sclerodoris apiculata (Alder & Hancock, 1864)
- Sclerodoris coriacea Eliot, 1904
- Sclerodoris japonica (Eliot, 1913)
- Sclerodoris minor Eliot, 1904
- Sclerodoris paliensis Bertsch & S. Johnson, 1982
- Sclerodoris prea (Ev. Marcus & Er. Marcus, 1967)
- Sclerodoris rubicunda (Baba, 1949)
- Sclerodoris tanya (Ev. Marcus, 1971)
- Sclerodoris tarka Burn, 1969
- Sclerodoris trenberthi (Burn, 1962)
- Sclerodoris tuberculata Eliot, 1904
- Sclerodoris virgulata Valdés, 2001
- Sclerodoris worki (Ev. Marcus & Er. Marcus, 1967)

== Synonyms ==
- Sclerodoris rubra is a synonym of Sclerodoris tuberculata
