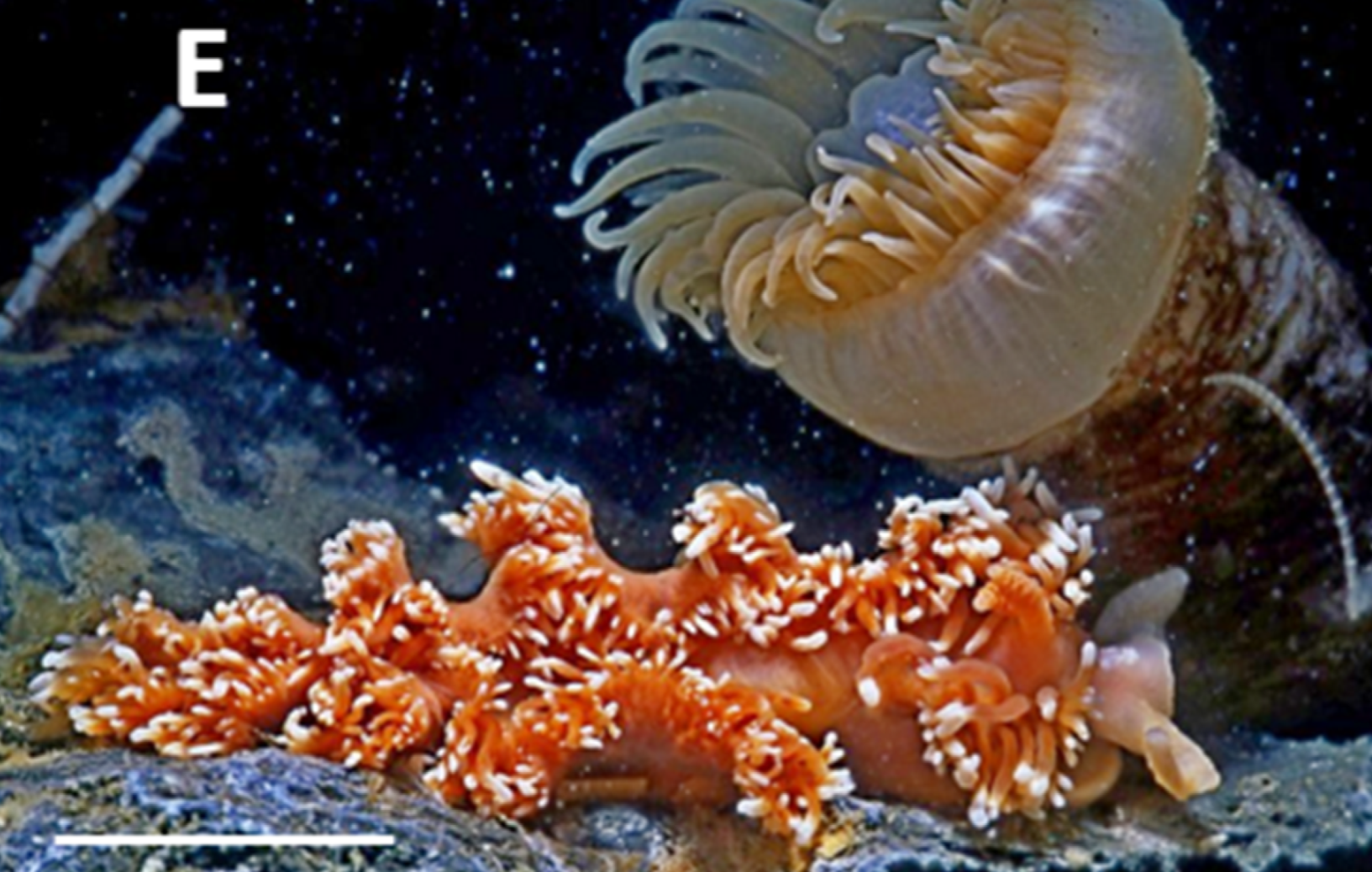
- Notaeolidia gigas, from South Shetland

Scientific classification
- Kingdom: Animalia
- Phylum: Mollusca
- Class: Gastropoda
- Order: Nudibranchia
- Suborder: Aeolidacea
- Superfamily: Notaeolidioidea; Eliot, 1910
- Family: Notaeolidiidae; Eliot, 1910
- Genus: Notaeolidia; Eliot, 1905

Species
- See text

= Notaeolidia =

Genus of gastropods

Notaeolidia is a genus of nudibranchs, shell-less marine gastropod molluscs or sea slugs, and the only member of the family Notaeolidiidae, itself the only member of the superfamily Notaeolidioidea.

== Species ==
The genus contains the following species:

- Notaeolidia depressa Eliot, 1907
- Notaeolidia gigas Eliot, 1905
- Notaeolidia schmekelae Wägele, 1990
