= Marionia ramosa =

Scientific classification
- Kingdom: Animalia
- Phylum: Mollusca
- Class: Gastropoda
- Order: Nudibranchia
- Suborder: Tritoniacea
- Family: Tritoniidae
- Genus: Marionia
- Species: M. pellucida

Binomial name
- Marionia pellucida Eliot, 1904

Species of gastropod

Marionia ramosa is a species of sea slug, a dendronotid nudibranch, a marine gastropod mollusc in the family Tritoniidae.

== Distribution ==
This species was described from north of Kokotoni, Zanzibar, East Africa, where it was dredged in 9 m of water.
