= Marionia cyanobranchiata =

Scientific classification
- Kingdom: Animalia
- Phylum: Mollusca
- Class: Gastropoda
- Order: Nudibranchia
- Suborder: Tritoniacea
- Family: Tritoniidae
- Genus: Marionia
- Species: M. cyanobranchiata

Binomial name
- Marionia cyanobranchiata (Rüppell & Leuckart, 1831)

Synonyms
- Tritonia cyanobranchiata Rüppell & Leuckart, 1831; Marioniopsis cyanobranchiata (Rüppell & Leuckart, 1831)

Species of gastropod

Marionia cyanobranchiata is a species of dendronotid nudibranch. It is a marine gastropod mollusc in the family Tritoniidae.

== Distribution ==
This species is endemic to the Red Sea.
