= Sclerodoris japonica =

Scientific classification
- Kingdom: Animalia
- Phylum: Mollusca
- Class: Gastropoda
- Order: Nudibranchia
- Family: Discodorididae
- Genus: Sclerodoris
- Species: S. japonica

Binomial name
- Sclerodoris japonica (Eliot, 1913)

Synonyms
- Halgerda japonica Eliot, 1913

Species of gastropod

Sclerodoris japonica is a species of sea slug, a dorid nudibranch, shell-less marine opisthobranch gastropod mollusks in the family Discodorididae.

== Distribution ==
This species was described from Japan.
