= T. rubra =

T. rubra may refer to:

- Thelymitra rubra, the salmon sun orchid, an orchid species endemic to southeastern Australia
- Tritonia rubra, a nudibranch species

== Synonyms ==
- Tissa rubra, a synonym for Spergularia rubra, a plant species native of Malta, Sicily and Algiers
