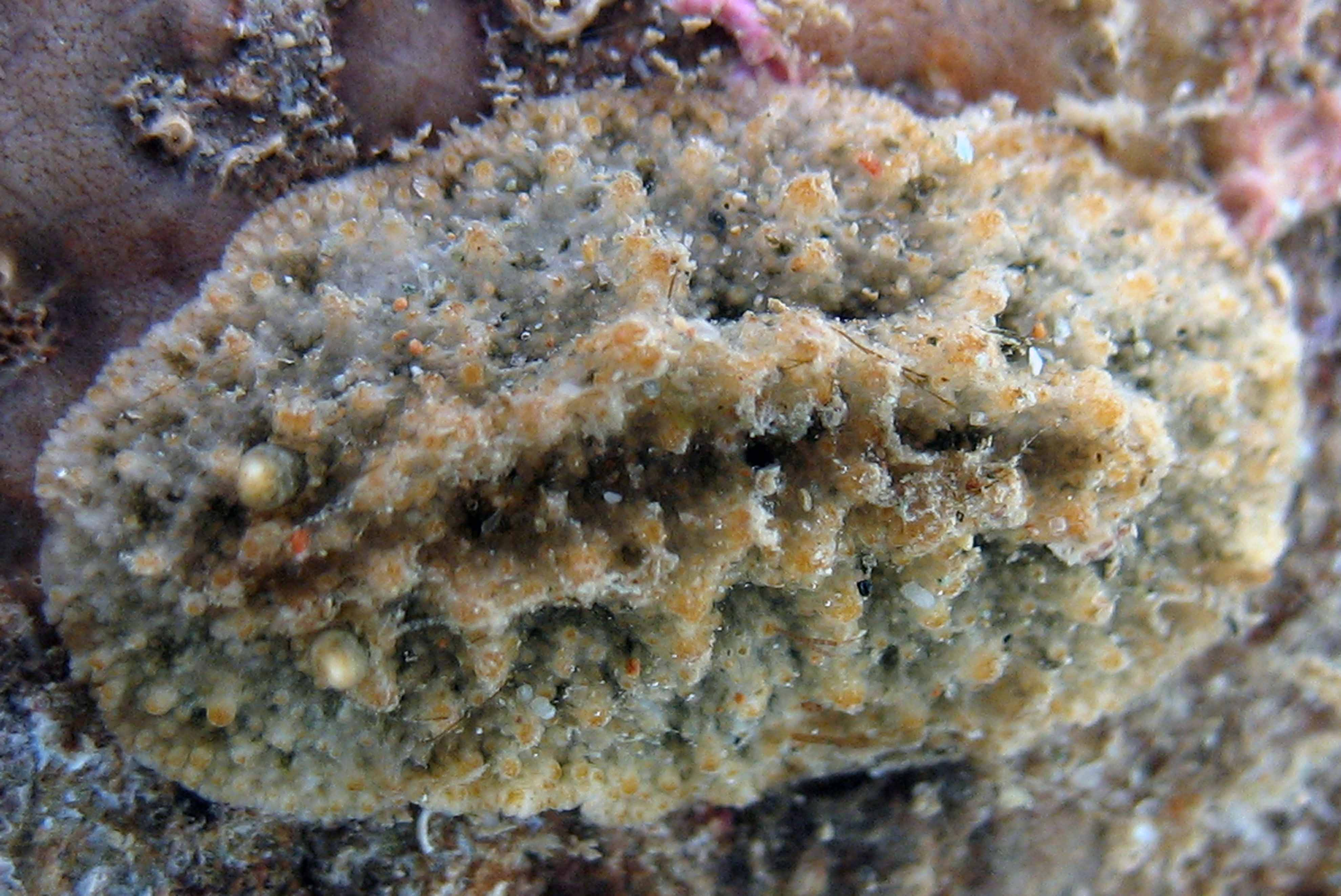
- Dorsal view of Sclerodoris prea

Scientific classification
- Domain: Eukaryota
- Kingdom: Animalia
- Phylum: Mollusca
- Class: Gastropoda
- Order: Nudibranchia
- Family: Discodorididae
- Genus: Sclerodoris
- Species: S. prea

Binomial name
- Sclerodoris prea (Ev. Marcus & Er. Marcus, 1967)

Synonyms
- Anisodoris prea Ev. Marcus & Er. Marcus, 1967; Atagema prea (Ev. Marcus & Er. Marcus, 1967)

= Sclerodoris prea =

Species of gastropod

Sclerodoris prea is a species of sea slug, a dorid nudibranch, shell-less marine opisthobranch gastropod mollusc in the family Discodorididae.

== Distribution ==
The distribution of Sclerodoris prea includes Florida, Venezuela, Bahamas, Jamaica, Barbados and Panama.

== Description ==
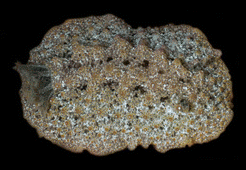
Dorsal view of Sclerodoris prea.

The body is oval and mantle is rigid. Dorsum is covered with numerous caryophyllidia. Larger tubercles are arranged in two rows along the visceral hump, with a longitudinal depression in the center. Rhinophores are elongate, gill is composed of multipinnate branchial leaves. Background color is cream-brown with numerous dark brown spots. Black patches are present along the center of the visceral hump. Rhinophores are cream with dark spots and gill is gray with opaque white spots. The maximum recorded body length is 40 mm.

== Ecology ==
Minimum recorded depth is 1 m. Maximum recorded depth is 3 m. It was found under rocks in Panama. This species probably feeds on sponges.
