= Marionia bathycarolinensis =

Scientific classification
- Kingdom: Animalia
- Phylum: Mollusca
- Class: Gastropoda
- Order: Nudibranchia
- Suborder: Tritoniacea
- Family: Tritoniidae
- Genus: Marionia
- Species: M. bathycarolinensis

Binomial name
- Marionia bathycarolinensis Smith & Gosliner, 2005

Species of gastropod

Marionia bathycarolinensis is a species of sea slug, a dendronotid nudibranch, a marine gastropod mollusc in the family Tritoniidae.

== Distribution ==
This species was described from two specimens collected in deep water (191–223 m) by a submarine at Mutremdiu 3, Palau, Caroline Islands, 07°16′27″N 134°34′37″E.

== Ecology ==
Analysis of the stomach contents suggests that this species feeds on a species of the octocoral Paracis Kükenthal, 1919, Family Plexauridae Gray, 1859.
