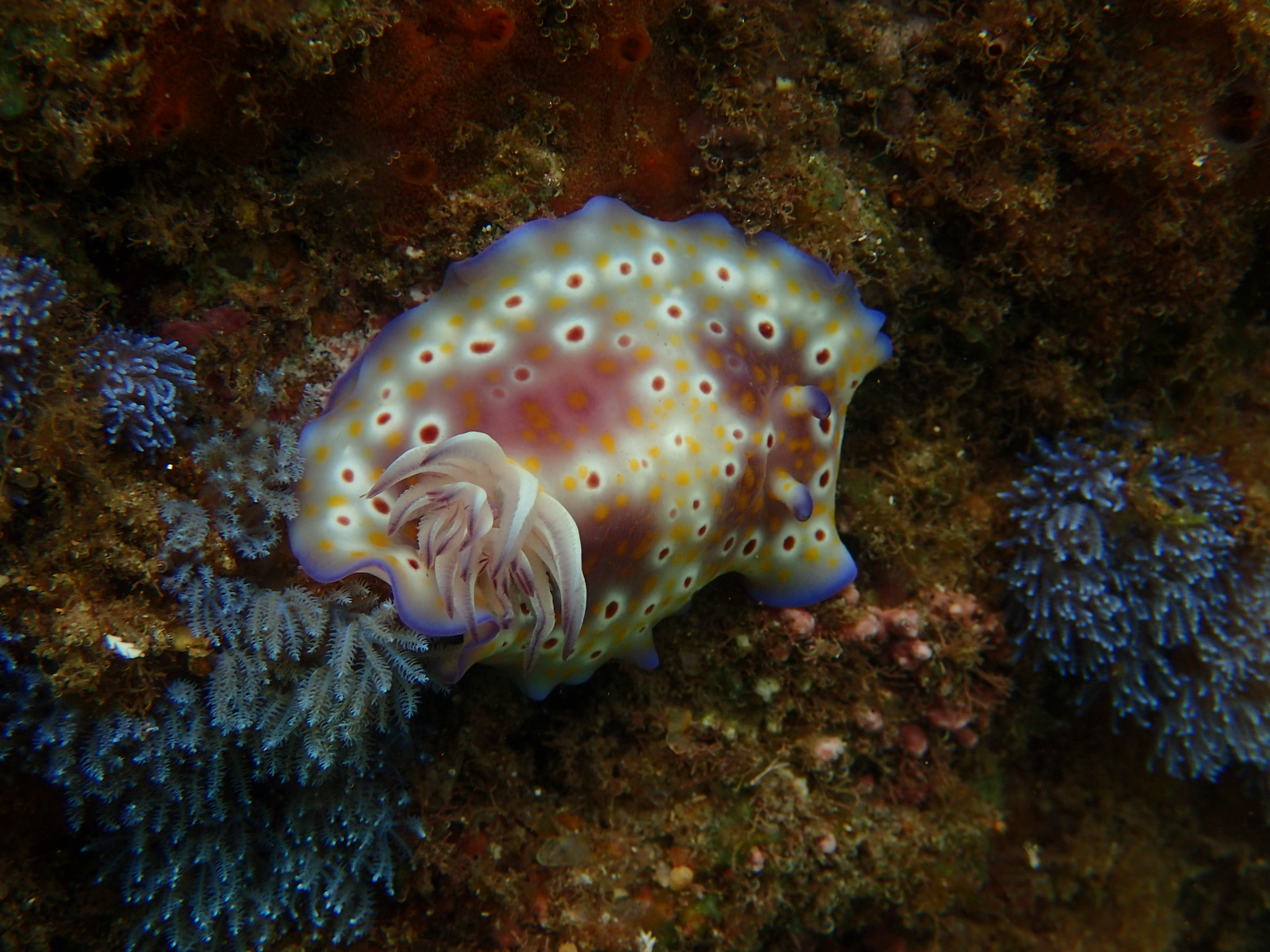
- Goniobranchus cavae
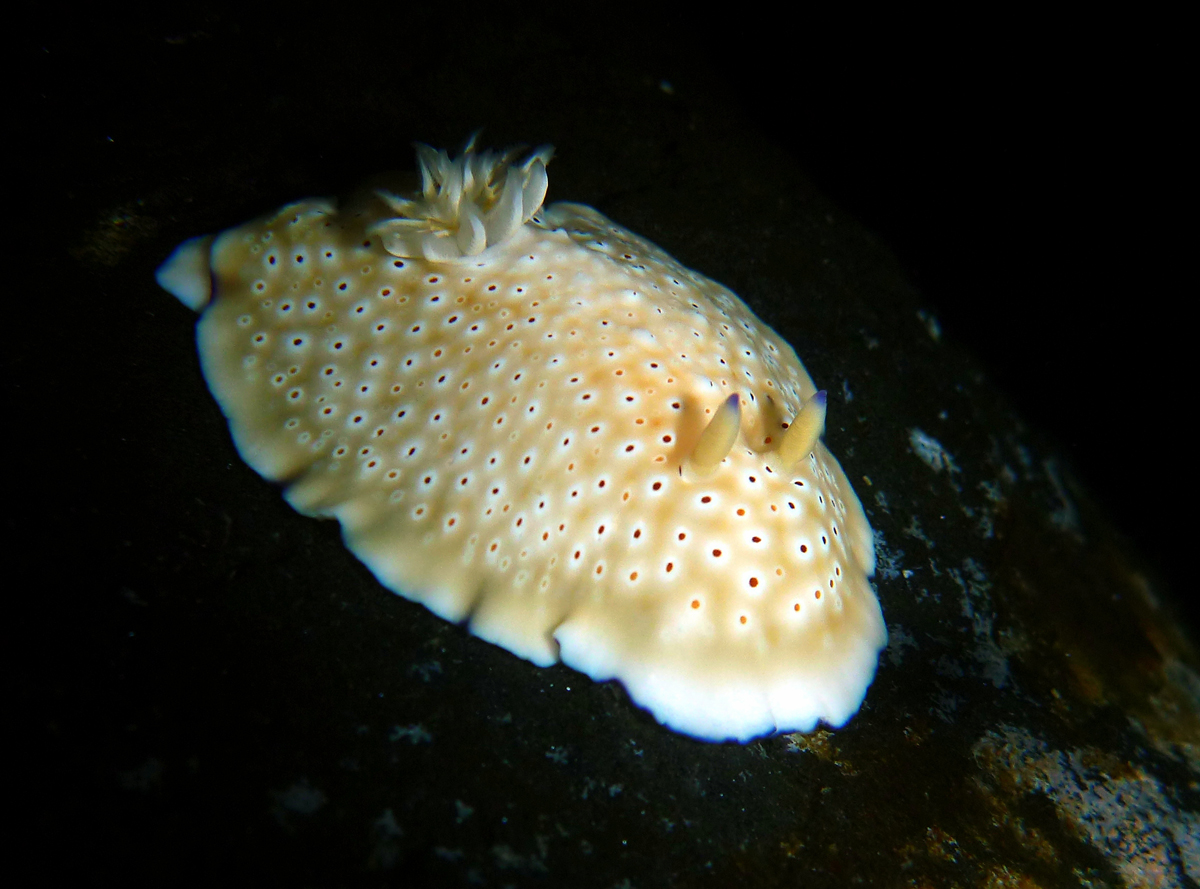
- Goniobranchus cf. cavae, Réunion Island colour form.

Scientific classification
- Kingdom: Animalia
- Phylum: Mollusca
- Class: Gastropoda
- Order: Nudibranchia
- Family: Chromodorididae
- Genus: Goniobranchus
- Species: G. cavae

Binomial name
- Goniobranchus cavae Eliot, 1904

Synonyms
- Chromodoris cavae Eliot, 1904

= Goniobranchus cavae =

Species of gastropod

Goniobranchus cavae is a species of colourful sea slug, a dorid nudibranch, a marine gastropod mollusc in the family Chromodorididae.

== Distribution ==
This species was described from Zanzibar, Tanzania. It has been reported from the NE coast of South Africa, Réunion, Mauritius and India. However the colour pattern is very variable and this may represent a species complex.

== Description ==
The description of the external appearance of the animal by Eliot reads: "Colour yellowish white, with indefinite large drab blotches laterally. Edges of mantle and foot bordered with light violet. On the back are black spots surrounded by a white line and also irregular dull orange spots. The foot is not very broad, white in colour, with a row of dull orange spots and black spots below them. The tip and anterior side of the rhinophores are purple; the lamellae are reduced to fine striations."

== Similar species ==
This species has been confused with Goniobranchus tennentanus but differs in having yellow spots all over the mantle, whilst in G. tennentanus these spots are only within the cream band at the edge.
