= Sclerodoris minor =

Scientific classification
- Kingdom: Animalia
- Phylum: Mollusca
- Class: Gastropoda
- Order: Nudibranchia
- Family: Discodorididae
- Genus: Sclerodoris
- Species: S. minor

Binomial name
- Sclerodoris minor Eliot, 1904

Species of gastropod

Sclerodoris minor is a species of sea slug, a dorid nudibranch, shell-less marine opisthobranch gastropod mollusc in the family Discodorididae.
