= Marionia platyctenea =

Scientific classification
- Kingdom: Animalia
- Phylum: Mollusca
- Class: Gastropoda
- Order: Nudibranchia
- Suborder: Tritoniacea
- Family: Tritoniidae
- Genus: Marionia
- Species: M. platyctenea

Binomial name
- Marionia platyctenea (Willan, 1988)

Synonyms
- Marioniopsis platyctenea Willan, 1988

Species of gastropod

Marionia platyctenea is a species of sea slug, a dendronotid nudibranch, a marine gastropod mollusc in the family Tritoniidae.

== Distribution ==
This species was described from Southeastern Australia.
