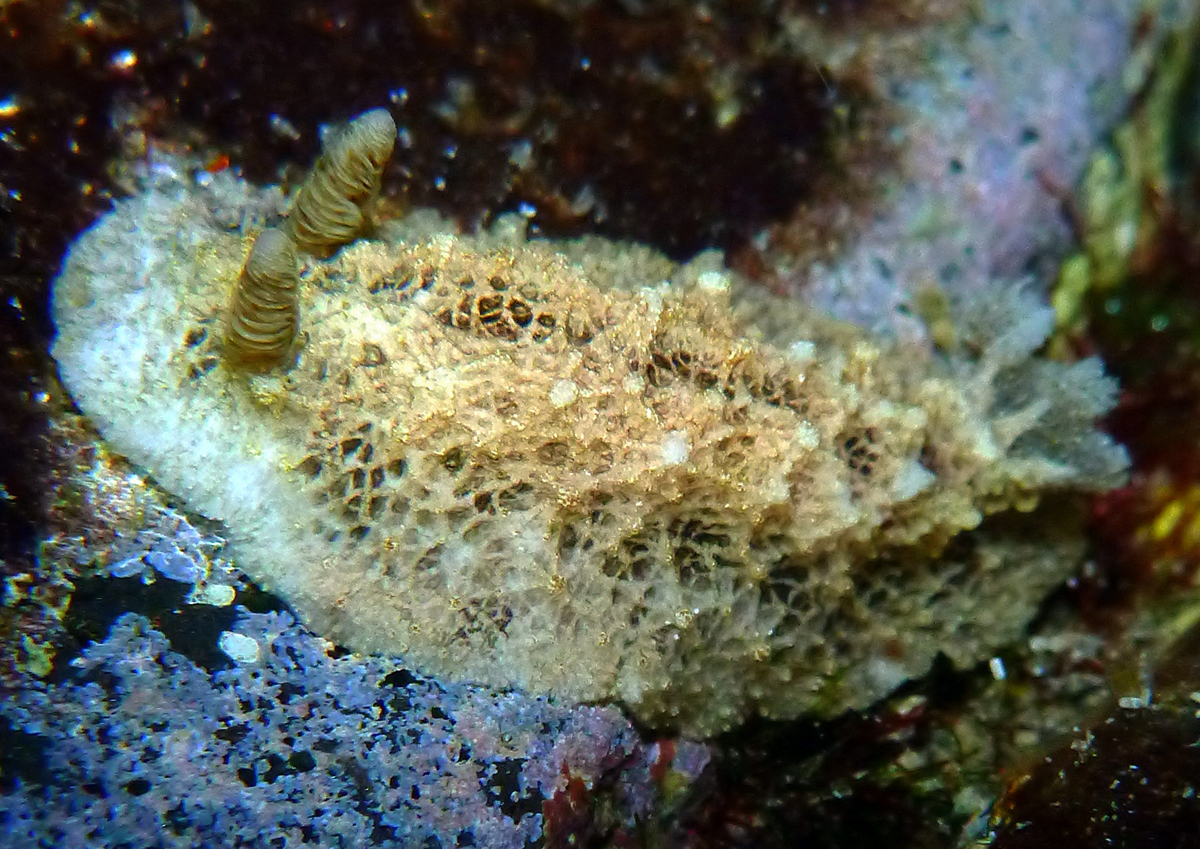
- Sclerodoris apiculata

Scientific classification
- Kingdom: Animalia
- Phylum: Mollusca
- Class: Gastropoda
- Order: Nudibranchia
- Family: Discodorididae
- Genus: Sclerodoris
- Species: S. apiculata

Binomial name
- Sclerodoris apiculata (Alder & Hancock, 1864)

Synonyms
- Doris apiculata Alder & Hancock, 1864; Halgerda apiculata (Alder & Hancock, 1864)

= Sclerodoris apiculata =

Species of gastropod

Sclerodoris apiculata is a species of sea slug, a dorid nudibranch, shell-less marine opisthobranch gastropod mollusks in the family Discodorididae.

== Distribution ==
This species was described from India.
