= Geitodoris bacalladoi =

Scientific classification
- Kingdom: Animalia
- Phylum: Mollusca
- Class: Gastropoda
- Order: Nudibranchia
- Family: Discodorididae
- Genus: Geitodoris
- Species: G. bacalladoi

Binomial name
- Geitodoris bacalladoi Ortea, 1990

Species of gastropod

Geitodoris bacalladoi is a species of sea slug or dorid nudibranch, a marine gastropod mollusk in the family Discodorididae.

== Distribution ==
It is mainly found in Mediterranean seabed environments. and in the Atlantic Ocean off the Canary Islands. The type locality is type locality: Agua Dulce, Tenerife (28°02'N, 16°33'W, 6 m)
