= Geitodoris joubini =

Scientific classification
- Kingdom: Animalia
- Phylum: Mollusca
- Class: Gastropoda
- Order: Nudibranchia
- Family: Discodorididae
- Genus: Geitodoris
- Species: G. joubini

Binomial name
- Geitodoris joubini (Vayssière, 1919)

Species of gastropod

Geitodoris joubini is a species of sea slug or dorid nudibranch, a marine gastropod mollusc in the family Discodorididae.
