= Geitodoris portmanni =

Scientific classification
- Kingdom: Animalia
- Phylum: Mollusca
- Class: Gastropoda
- Order: Nudibranchia
- Family: Discodorididae
- Genus: Geitodoris
- Species: G. portmanni

Binomial name
- Geitodoris portmanni (Schmekel, 1972)

Species of gastropod

Geitodoris portmanni is a species of sea slug or dorid nudibranch, a marine gastropod mollusk in the family Discodorididae.

== Distribution ==
Geitodoris portmanni is found off the southern coasts of France and Spain.
