= Geitodoris tema =

Scientific classification
- Kingdom: Animalia
- Phylum: Mollusca
- Class: Gastropoda
- Order: Nudibranchia
- Family: Discodorididae
- Genus: Geitodoris
- Species: G. tema

Binomial name
- Geitodoris tema (Edmunds, 1968)

Species of gastropod

Geitodoris tema is a species of sea slug or dorid nudibranch, a marine gastropod mollusk in the family Discodorididae.

== Distribution ==
Geitodoris tema is found off the coast of Ghana.
