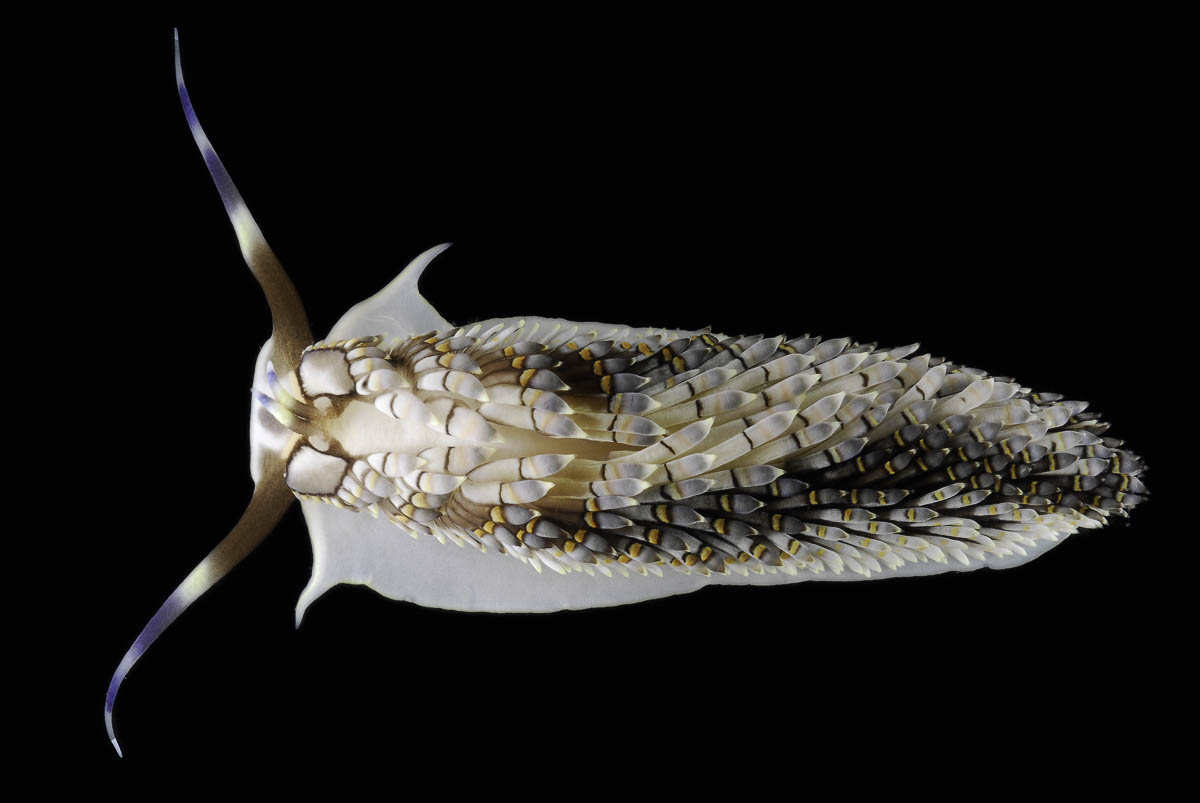
- The nudibranch Cerberilla africana, Likoni, Kenya.

Scientific classification
- Kingdom: Animalia
- Phylum: Mollusca
- Class: Gastropoda
- Order: Nudibranchia
- Suborder: Aeolidacea
- Family: Aeolidiidae
- Genus: Cerberilla
- Species: C. africana

Binomial name
- Cerberilla africana Eliot, 1903

= Cerberilla africana =

Species of sea slug

Cerberilla africana is a species of sea slug, an aeolid nudibranch, a marine heterobranch mollusc in the family Aeolidiidae.

== Distribution ==
This species was described from the beach at Jembiani, Zanzibar. It has been reported from localities in the Indian Ocean region from Sodwana Bay, South Africa to Mozambique and Tanzania.

== Description ==
All Cerberilla species have a broad foot and the cerata are long and numerous, arranged in transverse rows across the body. Eliot describes this species as having long oral tentacles which are dark blue with green bases and with a band of yellow on each of the dark green cerata. Recent photographs suggest that the dark green may be more brown and that there can be blue colouring above an orange band on the cerata. It grows to 45 mm in length. Cerberilla affinis Bergh, 1888 (Indonesia) and Cerberilla moebii (Bergh, 1888) - (Mauritius) are similar in colour.

== Ecology ==
Species of Cerberilla live on and in sandy substrates where they burrow beneath the surface and feed on burrowing sea anemones.
