= Cerberilla moebii =

Scientific classification
- Kingdom: Animalia
- Phylum: Mollusca
- Class: Gastropoda
- Order: Nudibranchia
- Suborder: Aeolidacea
- Family: Aeolidiidae
- Genus: Cerberilla
- Species: C. moebii

Binomial name
- Cerberilla moebii (Bergh, 1888)

Synonyms
- Fenrisia moebii Bergh, 1888

Species of gastropod

Cerberilla moebii is a species of sea slug, an aeolid nudibranch, a marine heterobranch mollusc in the family Aeolidiidae.

== Distribution ==
This species was described from Mauritius. A nudibranch from Reunion may be this species.

== Description ==
All Cerberilla species have a broad foot and the cerata are long and numerous, arranged in transverse rows across the body. In this species the long oral tentacles have bands of dark blue and there is a narrow band of black on each of the cerata. Two species from the Indian Ocean, Cerberilla africana Eliot, 1903 (East Africa) and Cerberilla affinis (Bergh, 1888) - Indonesia are similar in colour.

== Ecology ==
Species of Cerberilla live on and in sandy substrates where they burrow beneath the surface and feed on burrowing sea anemones.
