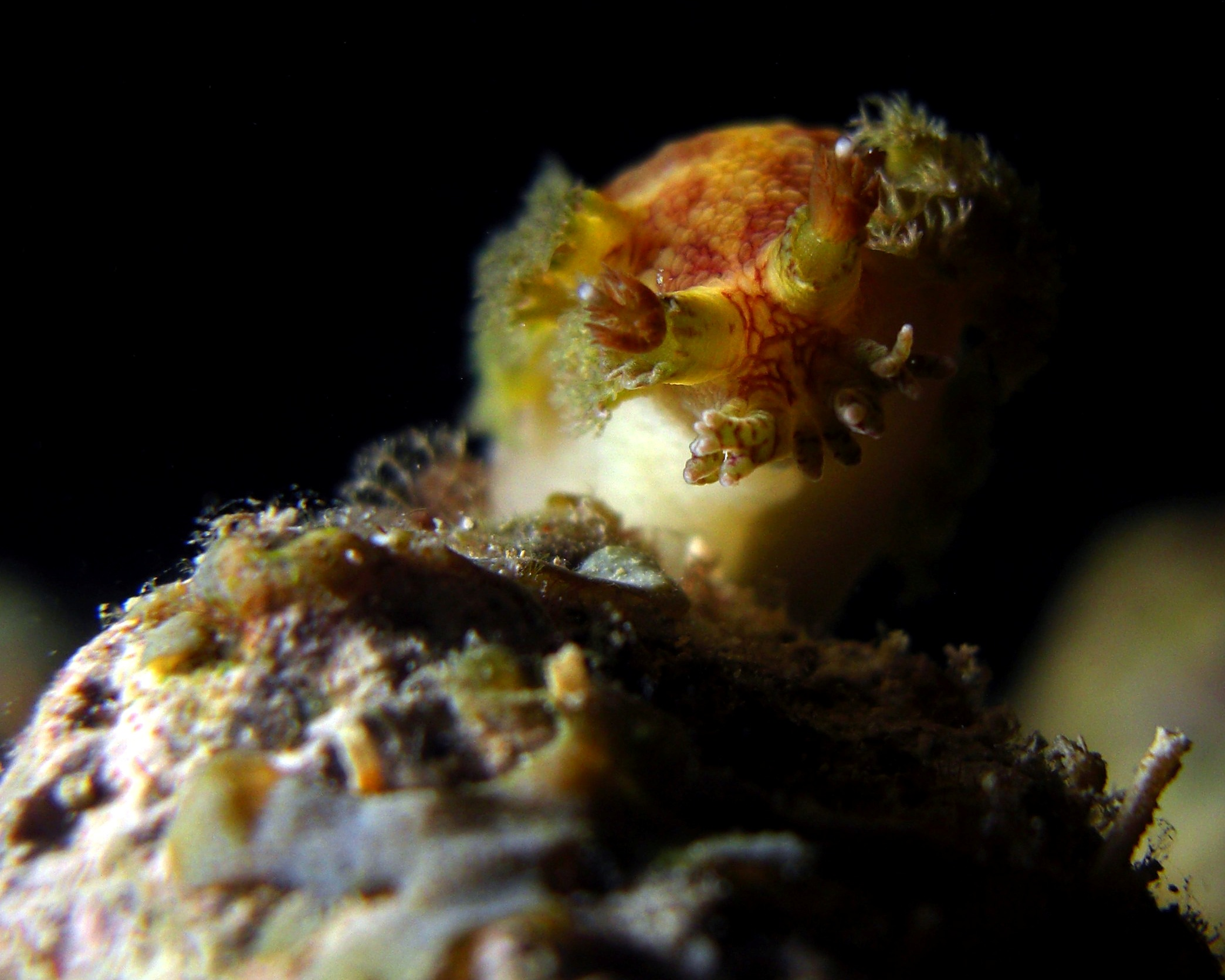

Scientific classification
- Kingdom: Animalia
- Phylum: Mollusca
- Class: Gastropoda
- Order: Nudibranchia
- Suborder: Tritoniacea
- Family: Tritoniidae
- Genus: Marionia
- Species: M. elongoreticulata

Binomial name
- Marionia elongoreticulata V. G. Smith & Gosliner, 2007

= Marionia elongoreticulata =

Species of gastropod

Marionia elongoreticulata is a species of sea slug, a dendronotid nudibranch, a marine gastropod mollusc in the family Tritoniidae.

== Distribution ==
This species was described from North Najata (Nyata) Island, Banda Sea, 7.50910°S 127.29008°E, Indonesia with additional specimens from Culebra Island in the Verde Island Passage, Philippines, 13.63018°N 120.94725°E. It has been reported from Pulau Sangeang, 8.18282°S 118.98663°E, Indonesia.
