= Marionia gemmii =

Scientific classification
- Kingdom: Animalia
- Phylum: Mollusca
- Class: Gastropoda
- Order: Nudibranchia
- Suborder: Tritoniacea
- Family: Tritoniidae
- Genus: Marionia
- Species: M. gemmii

Binomial name
- Marionia gemmii Almón, Pérez & Caballer, 2018

Species of gastropod

Marionia gemmii is a species of sea slug, a dendronotid nudibranch, a marine gastropod mollusc in the family Tritoniidae.

== Distribution ==
This species was described from the Ria de Arousa, NW Spain, 42.5057°N 8.9347°W. It has been reported from the Mediterranean Sea.
