= Marionia dakini =

Scientific classification
- Kingdom: Animalia
- Phylum: Mollusca
- Class: Gastropoda
- Order: Nudibranchia
- Suborder: Tritoniacea
- Family: Tritoniidae
- Genus: Marionia
- Species: M. dakini

Binomial name
- Marionia dakini (O'Donoghue, 1924)

Synonyms
- Sphaerostoma dakini O'Donoghue, 1924

Species of gastropod

Marionia dakini is a species of sea slug, a dendronotid nudibranch, a marine gastropod mollusc in the family Tritoniidae.

== Distribution ==
This species was described from the Abrolhos Islands, Australia.
