= Geitodoris granulata =

Scientific classification
- Kingdom: Animalia
- Phylum: Mollusca
- Class: Gastropoda
- Order: Nudibranchia
- Family: Discodorididae
- Genus: Geitodoris
- Species: G. granulata

Binomial name
- Geitodoris granulata Lin & Wu, 1994

Species of gastropod

Geitodoris granulata is a species of sea slug or dorid nudibranch, a marine gastropod mollusk in the family Discodorididae.
