= Notaeolidia gigas =

Scientific classification
- Kingdom: Animalia
- Phylum: Mollusca
- Class: Gastropoda
- Order: Nudibranchia
- Suborder: Aeolidacea
- Family: Notaeolidiidae
- Genus: Notaeolidia
- Species: N. gigas

Binomial name
- Notaeolidia gigas (Eliot, 1905)

Species of gastropod

Notaeolidia gigas is a species of sea slug, an aeolid nudibranch, a marine gastropod mollusc in the family Notaeolidiidae.

== Distribution ==
The species was first described in 1905 based on collections from the South Orkney Islands and was later redescribed in 1990 based on a specimen collected from King George Island. It has been reported from a number of Antarctic localities at depths of 3–50 m.
