= Marionia abrahamorum =

Scientific classification
- Kingdom: Animalia
- Phylum: Mollusca
- Class: Gastropoda
- Order: Nudibranchia
- Suborder: Tritoniacea
- Family: Tritoniidae
- Genus: Marionia
- Species: M. abrahamorum

Binomial name
- Marionia abrahamorum F. V. Silva, Herrero-Barrencua, Pola & Cervera, 2019

Species of gastropod

Marionia abrahamorum is a species of sea slug, a dendronotid nudibranch, a marine gastropod mollusc in the family Tritoniidae.

== Distribution ==
This species was described from Principe, São Tomé and Príncipe.
