= Geitodoris capensis =

Scientific classification
- Kingdom: Animalia
- Phylum: Mollusca
- Class: Gastropoda
- Order: Nudibranchia
- Family: Discodorididae
- Genus: Geitodoris
- Species: G. capensis

Binomial name
- Geitodoris capensis Bergh, 1907

Species of gastropod

Geitodoris capensis is a species of sea slug or dorid nudibranch, a marine gastropod mollusk in the family Discodorididae.

== Distribution ==
Geitodoris capensis is found off the coast of South Africa.
