= Marionia elongoviridis =

Scientific classification
- Kingdom: Animalia
- Phylum: Mollusca
- Class: Gastropoda
- Order: Nudibranchia
- Suborder: Tritoniacea
- Family: Tritoniidae
- Genus: Marionia
- Species: M. elongoviridis

Binomial name
- Marionia elongoviridis V. G. Smith & Gosliner, 2007

Species of gastropod

Marionia elongoviridis is a species of sea slug, a dendronotid nudibranch, a marine gastropod mollusc in the family Tritoniidae.

== Distribution ==
This species was described from Culebra Island in the Verde Island Passage, Philippines, 13.63018°N 120.94725°E. It has been reported from Pulau Sangeang, 8.18282°S 118.98663°E, Indonesia.
