= Geitodoris patagonica =

Scientific classification
- Kingdom: Animalia
- Phylum: Mollusca
- Class: Gastropoda
- Order: Nudibranchia
- Family: Discodorididae
- Genus: Geitodoris
- Species: G. patagonica

Binomial name
- Geitodoris patagonica Odhner, 1926

Species of gastropod

Geitodoris patagonica is a species of sea slug or dorid nudibranch, a marine gastropod mollusk in the family Discodorididae.

== Distribution ==
Geitodoris patagonica is mainly found in the Patagonia region of Argentina and Chile, but it has also been found on the Falkland Islands.

== Description ==
The maximum recorded body length is 30 mm.

== Ecology ==
Minimum recorded depth is 9 m. Maximum recorded depth is 10 m.
