= Notaeolidia schmekelae =

Scientific classification
- Kingdom: Animalia
- Phylum: Mollusca
- Class: Gastropoda
- Order: Nudibranchia
- Suborder: Aeolidacea
- Family: Notaeolidiidae
- Genus: Notaeolidia
- Species: N. schmekelae

Binomial name
- Notaeolidia schmekelae Wägele, 1990

Species of gastropod

Notaeolidia schmekelae is a species of sea slug, an aeolid nudibranch, a marine gastropod mollusc in the family Notaeolidiidae.

== Distribution ==
This species was described from 250 m depth at 76°52.0′S 50°40.4′W, Antarctica. The original description includes seven specimens from a number of Antarctic localities at depths of 250–480 m.
