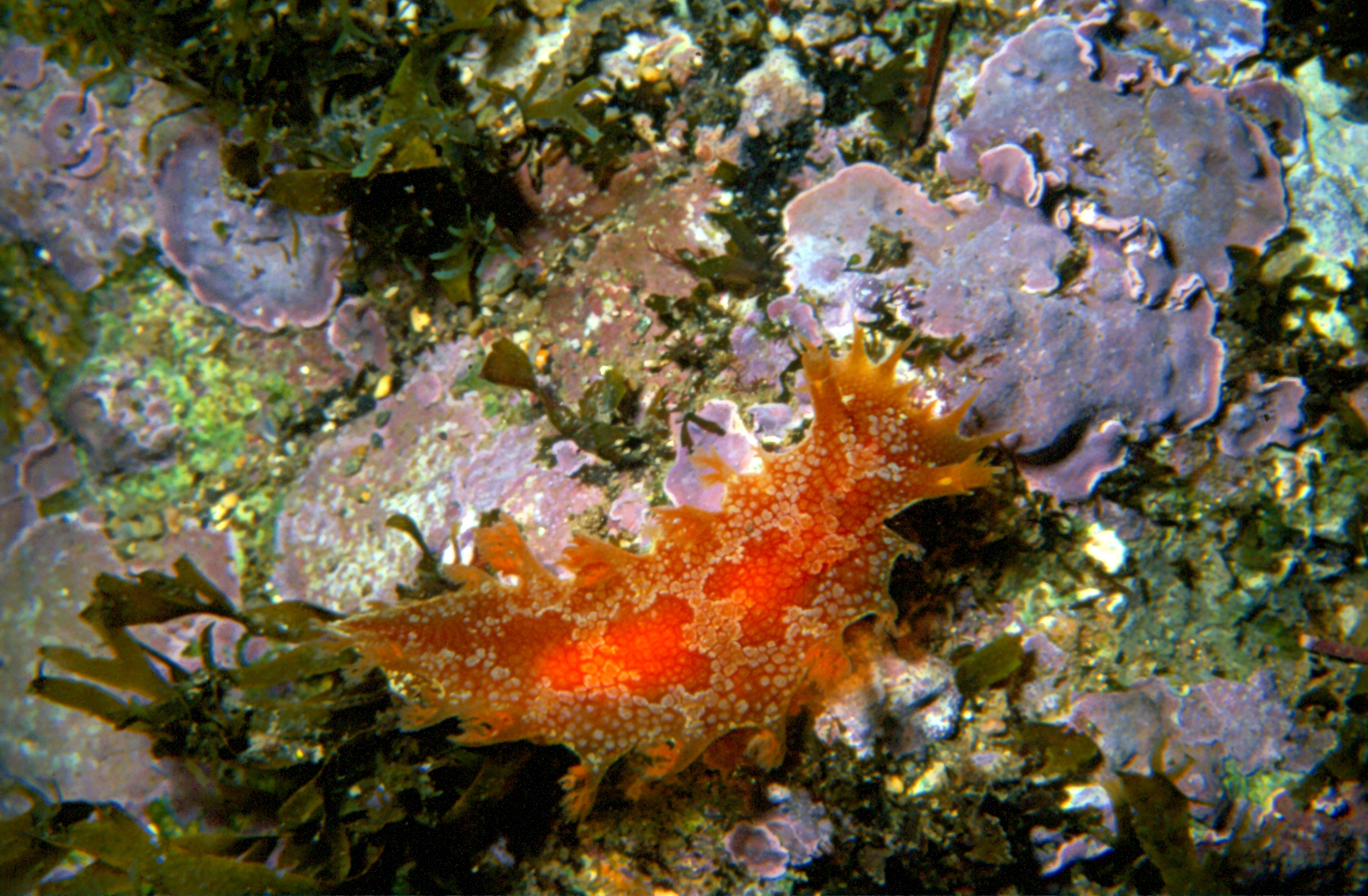
- An adult Marionia blainvillea

Scientific classification
- Kingdom: Animalia
- Phylum: Mollusca
- Class: Gastropoda
- Order: Nudibranchia
- Suborder: Tritoniacea
- Family: Tritoniidae
- Genus: Marionia; Vayssière, 1877

Species
- See text

Synonyms
- Marioniopsis Odhner, 1934

= Marionia =

Genus of gastropods

Marionia is a genus of sea slugs, specifically dendronotid nudibranchs, marine gastropod molluscs in the family Tritoniidae.

== Species ==
Species within the genus Marionia include:

- Marionia abrahamorum F. V. Silva, Herrero-Barrencua, Pola & Cervera, 2019
- Marionia albotuberculata Eliot, 1904
- Marionia arborescens Bergh, 1890
- Marionia babai (Odhner, 1936)
- Marionia bathycarolinensis Smith & Gosliner, 2005
- Marionia blainvillea (Risso, 1818)
- Marionia cabindae White, 1955
- Marionia chloanthes Bergh, 1902
- Marionia cucullata (Couthouy, 1852)
- Marionia cyanobranchiata (Ruppell & Leuckart, 1831)
- Marionia dakini (O'Donoghue, 1924)
- Marionia distincta Bergh, 1905
- Marionia echinomuriceae Jensen, 1994
- Marionia elongoreticulata Smith & Gosliner, 2007
- Marionia elongoviridis Smith & Gosliner, 2007
- Marionia gemmii Almón, Pérez & Caballer, 2018
- Marionia glama (Rüppell & Leuckart, 1828)
- Marionia ghanensis Edmunds & Carmona, 2017
- Marionia hawaiiensis (Pease, 1860)
- Marionia kinoi Angulo-Campillo & Bertsch, 2013
- Marionia levis Eliot, 1904
- Marionia limceana Silva, de Meirelles & Matthews-Cascon, 2013
- Marionia olivacea Baba, 1937
- Marionia pellucida Eliot, 1904
- Marionia platyctenea (Willan, 1988)
- Marionia pusa Er. Marcus & Ev. Marcus, 1968
- Marionia pustulosa Odhner, 1936
- Marionia ramosa Eliot, 1904
- Marionia rubra (Rüppell & Leuckart, 1831)
- Marionia semperi Jensen, 1994
- Marionia tedi Ev. Marcus, 1983
- Marionia vanira Ev. Marcus & Er. Marcus, 1966
- Marionia viridescens Eliot, 1904

Species brought into synonymy

- Marionia affinis Bergh, 1883: synonym of Marionia blainvillea (Risso, 1818) (synonym)
- Marionia berghii Vayssière, 1879: synonym of Marionia blainvillea (Risso, 1818) (synonym)
- Marionia occidentalis Bergh, 1884: synonym of Marionia cucullata (Couthouy, 1852)
- Marionia tethydea [sic]: synonym of Marionia blainvillea (Risso, 1818) (misspelling of thethydea (Delle Chiaje, 1841))
