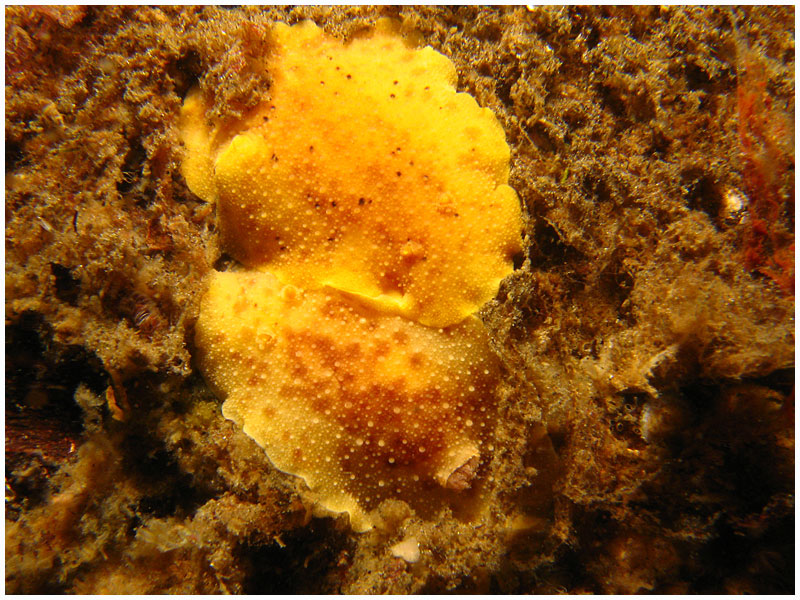
- A pair of mating Geitodoris heathi

Scientific classification
- Kingdom: Animalia
- Phylum: Mollusca
- Class: Gastropoda
- Order: Nudibranchia
- Family: Discodorididae
- Genus: Geitodoris; Bergh 1892

= Geitodoris =

Genus of gastropods

Geitodoris is a genus of sea slugs, dorid nudibranchs, shell-less marine gastropod mollusks in the family Discodorididae.

== Species ==
Species in the genus Geitodoris include:

- Geitodoris bacalladoi Ortea, 1990
- Geitodoris bonosi Ortea & Ballesteros, 1981
- Geitodoris capensis Bergh, 1907
- Geitodoris granulata Lin & Wu, 1994
- Geitodoris heathi Macfarland, 1905
- Geitodoris immunda Bergh, 1894
- Geitodoris joubini (Vayssière, 1919)
- Geitodoris mavis (Marcus & Marcus, 1967)
- Geitodoris pallida Valdes, 2001
- Geitodoris patagonica Odhner, 1926 Synonyms: Geitodoris falklandica
- Geitodoris perfossa Ortea, 1990
- Geitodoris planata (Alder & Hancock, 1846) Synonyms: Geitodoris complanata
- Geitodoris portmanni (Schmekel, 1972)
- Geitodoris pusae (Marcus Er., 1955)
- Geitodoris reticulata Eliot, 1906
- Geitodoris tema (Edmunds, 1968)

Species considered invalid:

- Geitodoris rubens (Vayssière, 1919) - Nomen dubium
