= Marionia cabindae =

Scientific classification
- Kingdom: Animalia
- Phylum: Mollusca
- Class: Gastropoda
- Order: Nudibranchia
- Suborder: Tritoniacea
- Family: Tritoniidae
- Genus: Marionia
- Species: M. cabindae

Binomial name
- Marionia cabindae White, 1955

Species of gastropod

Marionia cabindae is a species of sea slug, a dendronotid nudibranch, a marine gastropod mollusc in the family Tritoniidae.

== Distribution ==
This species was described from West Africa. The type material consisted of one specimen taken at 5°39′S 12°0′E, at a depth of 40 m, on 14.10.1948, twelve miles W.S.W. of Cabinda, and one taken at 5°48′S 12°03′E at a depth of 30-35 m on 16.10.1948, seven miles S.W. of Pointe Ngelo.
