= Marionia babai =

Scientific classification
- Kingdom: Animalia
- Phylum: Mollusca
- Class: Gastropoda
- Order: Nudibranchia
- Suborder: Tritoniacea
- Family: Tritoniidae
- Genus: Marionia
- Species: M. babai

Binomial name
- Marionia babai Odhner, 1936

Synonyms
- Marioniopsis babai Odhner, 1936

Species of gastropod

Marionia babai is a species of sea slug, a dendronotid nudibranch, a marine gastropod mollusc in the family Tritoniidae.
