= Calmella gaditana =

Scientific classification
- Kingdom: Animalia
- Phylum: Mollusca
- Class: Gastropoda
- Order: Nudibranchia
- Suborder: Aeolidacea
- Family: Flabellinidae
- Genus: Calmella
- Species: C. gaditana

Binomial name
- Calmella gaditana (Cervera, García-Gómez & García, 1987)

Synonyms
- Flabellina confusa Gonzalez-Duarte, Cervera & Poddubetskaia, 2008; Piseinotecus gaditanus Cervera, García-Gómez & García, 1987

Species of gastropod

Calmella gaditana is a species of sea slug, an aeolid nudibranch, a marine gastropod mollusk in the family Flabellinidae.

== Distribution ==
This nudibranch was described from Cádiz, Spain. It has since been found in the Cape Verde Islands, the Canary Islands, Senegal and the Bay of Biscay north to the Arcachon Bay, France.

== Description ==
This nudibranch is translucent white in colour and reaches 12 mm in length. The tips of the rhinophores, oral tentacles and tail are tipped with white. The digestive gland in the cerata is red and there are large white spots all over the surfaces of the cerata. The buccal mass is bright pink-purple and shows through the skin and tissue of the head as two oval masses.

== Ecology ==
Calmella gaditana feeds on hydroids. It has been reported eating Eudendrium species in the Bay of Arcachon. It has been found in rock pools on the shore and in shallow water with strong currents.
