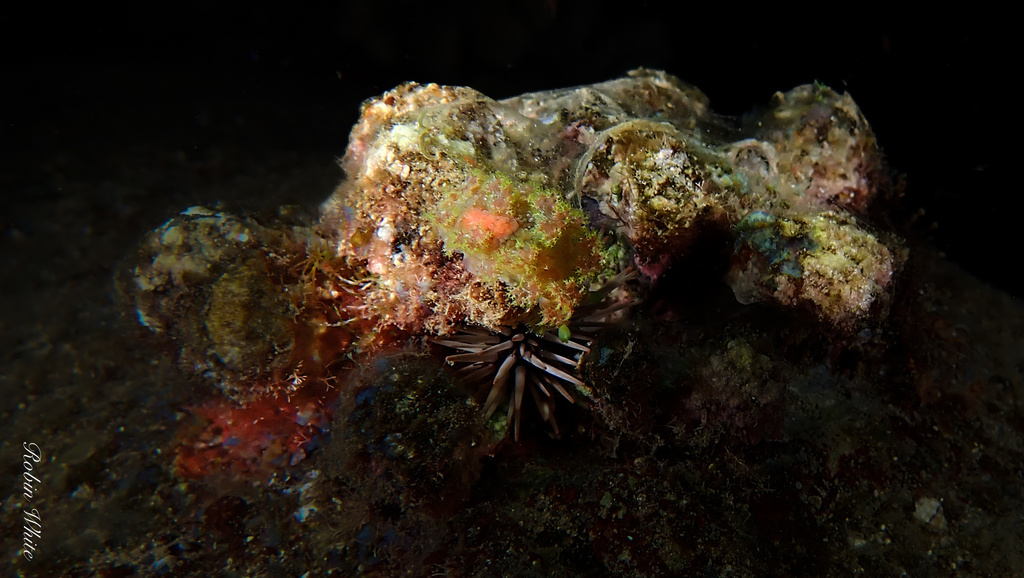

Scientific classification
- Kingdom: Animalia
- Phylum: Mollusca
- Class: Gastropoda
- Order: Nudibranchia
- Suborder: Tritoniacea
- Family: Tritoniidae
- Genus: Marionia
- Species: M. hawaiiensis

Binomial name
- Marionia hawaiiensis (Pease, 1860)

Synonyms
- Tritonia hawaiiensis Pease, 1860

= Marionia hawaiiensis =

Species of gastropod

Marionia hawaiiensis is a species of dendronotid nudibranch. It is a marine gastropod mollusc in the family Tritoniidae.

== Distribution ==
This species was described from the Hawaiian Islands.
