= Marionia distincta =

Scientific classification
- Kingdom: Animalia
- Phylum: Mollusca
- Class: Gastropoda
- Order: Nudibranchia
- Suborder: Tritoniacea
- Family: Tritoniidae
- Genus: Marionia
- Species: M. distincta

Binomial name
- Marionia distincta Bergh, 1905

Species of gastropod

Marionia distincta is a species of sea slug, a dendronotid nudibranch, a marine gastropod mollusc in the family Tritoniidae.

== Distribution ==
This species was described from station 315, the anchorage at Pulau Sailus Besar, Paternoster Islands (Tengah Islands, 7.5378°S 117.4427°E) from a dredge with maximum depth of 36 m and a seabed of coral and Lithothamnion.
