= Geitodoris mavis =

Scientific classification
- Kingdom: Animalia
- Phylum: Mollusca
- Class: Gastropoda
- Order: Nudibranchia
- Family: Discodorididae
- Genus: Geitodoris
- Species: G. mavis

Binomial name
- Geitodoris mavis (Er. Marcus & Ev. Marcus, 1967)

Species of gastropod

Geitodoris mavis is a species of sea slug or dorid nudibranch, a marine gastropod mollusk in the family Discodorididae.

== Distribution ==
Geitodoris mavis is found off the coasts of Mexico, Costa Rica, Ecuador, and Panama.
