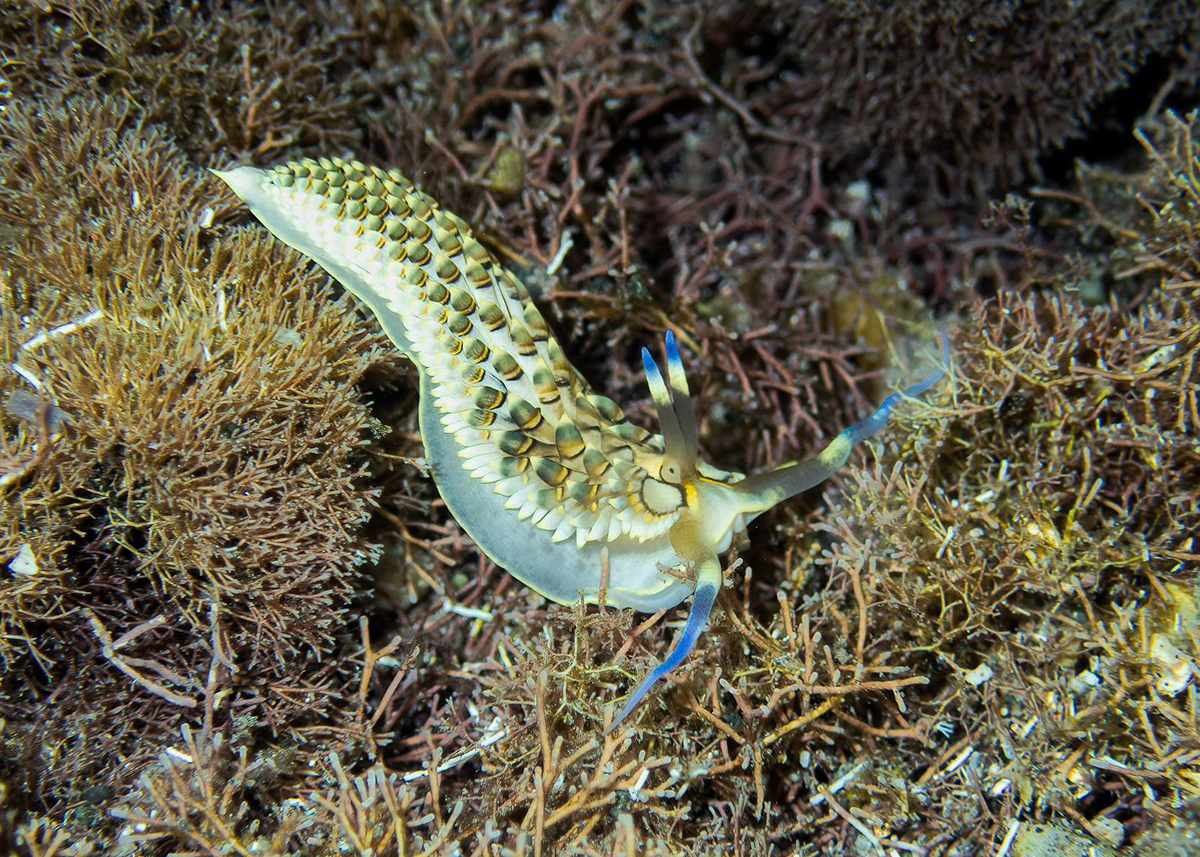
- Cerberilla affinis at Réunion island

Scientific classification
- Kingdom: Animalia
- Phylum: Mollusca
- Class: Gastropoda
- Order: Nudibranchia
- Suborder: Aeolidacea
- Family: Aeolidiidae
- Genus: Cerberilla
- Species: C. affinis

Binomial name
- Cerberilla affinis Bergh, 1888

Synonyms
- Cerberilla annulata var. affinis Bergh, 1888 (Basionym)

= Cerberilla affinis =

Species of gastropod

Cerberilla affinis is a species of sea slug, an aeolid nudibranch, a marine heterobranch mollusc in the family Aeolidiidae. It was described as a variety by Bergh, 1888 but elevated to species status by Burn, 1966.

== Distribution ==
This species was described from Indonesia. It has been reported from localities in the Central Indo-Pacific region to Lord Howe Island, the eastern Australian mainland and New Caledonia and is probably widespread in the West Pacific.

== Description ==
All Cerberilla species have a broad foot and the cerata are long and numerous, arranged in transverse rows across the body. In this species the long oral tentacles have bands of dark blue and there is a narrow band of black on each of the cerata. Two species from the Indian Ocean, Cerberilla africana Eliot, 1903 (East Africa) and Cerberilla moebii (Bergh, 1888) - Mauritius are similar in colour.

== Ecology ==
Species of Cerberilla live on and in sandy substrates where they burrow beneath the surface and feed on burrowing sea anemones.
