= Sclerodoris rubicunda =

Scientific classification
- Kingdom: Animalia
- Phylum: Mollusca
- Class: Gastropoda
- Order: Nudibranchia
- Family: Discodorididae
- Genus: Sclerodoris
- Species: S. rubicunda

Binomial name
- Sclerodoris rubicunda (Baba, 1949)

Synonyms
- Halgerda rubicunda Baba, 1949

Species of gastropod

Sclerodoris rubicunda is a species of sea slug, a dorid nudibranch, shell-less marine opisthobranch gastropod mollusc in the family Discodorididae.
