= Notaeolidia depressa =

Scientific classification
- Kingdom: Animalia
- Phylum: Mollusca
- Class: Gastropoda
- Order: Nudibranchia
- Suborder: Aeolidacea
- Family: Notaeolidiidae
- Genus: Notaeolidia
- Species: N. depressa

Binomial name
- Notaeolidia depressa Eliot, 1907

Species of gastropod

Notaeolidia depressa is a species of sea slug, an aeolid nudibranch, a marine gastropod mollusc in the family Notaeolidiidae.

== Distribution ==
This species was described from McMurdo Bay, Ross Sea, Antarctica. It has been reported from a number of Antarctic localities at depths of 30–429 m.
