= Marionia kinoi =

Scientific classification
- Kingdom: Animalia
- Phylum: Mollusca
- Class: Gastropoda
- Order: Nudibranchia
- Suborder: Tritoniacea
- Family: Tritoniidae
- Genus: Marionia
- Species: M. kinoi

Binomial name
- Marionia kinoi Angulo-Campillo & Bertsch, 2013

Species of gastropod

Marionia kinoi is a species of sea slug, a dendronotid nudibranch, a marine gastropod mollusc in the family Tritoniidae.

== Distribution ==
This species was described from a site two miles south of Punta Arenas, Gulf of California coastline east of La Paz, near La Riviera, Baja California Sur, Mexico (23°29′24″N 109°27′08″W), 16 m depth.
