= Geitodoris reticulata =

Scientific classification
- Kingdom: Animalia
- Phylum: Mollusca
- Class: Gastropoda
- Order: Nudibranchia
- Family: Discodorididae
- Genus: Geitodoris
- Species: G. reticulata

Binomial name
- Geitodoris reticulata Eliot, 1906

Species of gastropod

Geitodoris reticulata is a species of sea slug or dorid nudibranch, a marine gastropod mollusk in the family Discodorididae.

== Distribution ==
This species occurs in the Atlantic Ocean off Cape Verde.
