= Geitodoris bonosi =

Scientific classification
- Kingdom: Animalia
- Phylum: Mollusca
- Class: Gastropoda
- Order: Nudibranchia
- Family: Discodorididae
- Genus: Geitodoris
- Species: G. bonosi

Binomial name
- Geitodoris bonosi Ortea & Ballesteros, 1981

Species of gastropod

Geitodoris bonosi is a species of sea slug or dorid nudibranch, a marine gastropod mollusk in the family Discodorididae.
