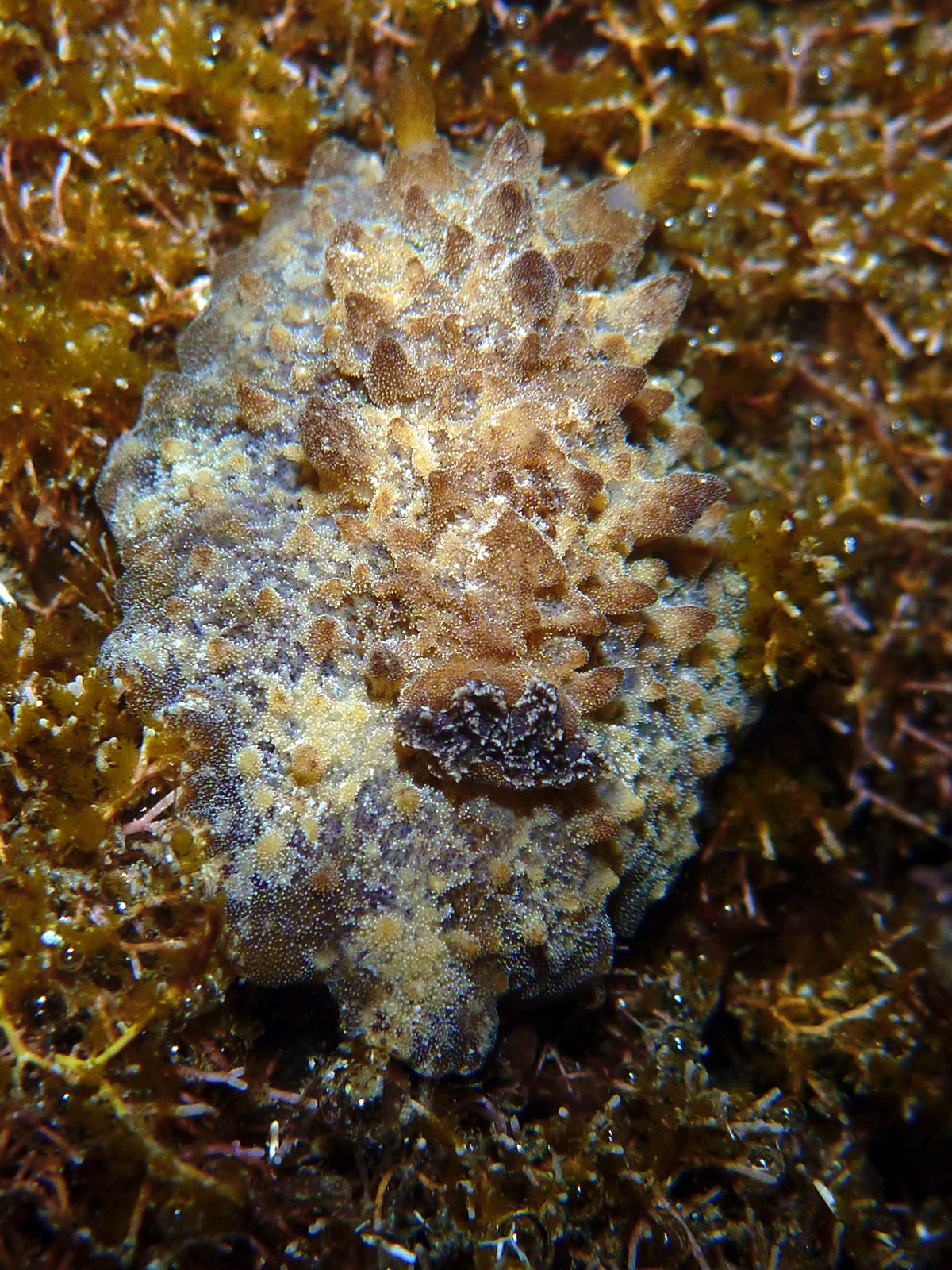
- Sclerodoris coriacea

Scientific classification
- Kingdom: Animalia
- Phylum: Mollusca
- Class: Gastropoda
- Order: Nudibranchia
- Family: Discodorididae
- Genus: Sclerodoris
- Species: S. coriacea

Binomial name
- Sclerodoris coriacea Eliot, 1904

= Sclerodoris coriacea =

Species of gastropod

Sclerodoris coriacea is a species of sea slug, a dorid nudibranch, shell-less marine opisthobranch gastropod mollusks in the family Discodorididae.

== Distribution ==
This species was described from a cave near Chuaka, on the east coast of Zanzibar, East Africa.
