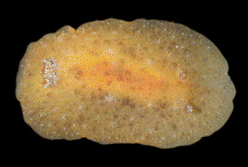
- Dorsal view of Geitodoris cf. planata

Scientific classification
- Kingdom: Animalia
- Phylum: Mollusca
- Class: Gastropoda
- Order: Nudibranchia
- Family: Discodorididae
- Genus: Geitodoris
- Species: G. planata

Binomial name
- Geitodoris planata (Alder & A. Hancock, 1846)

Synonyms
- Doris planata Alder & Hancock, 1846; Discodoris planata (Alder & Hancock, 1846); Doris complanata Verrill, 1880; Doris testudinaria Risso, 1826 (dubious synonym); Geitodoris complanata (A. E. Verrill, 1880)

= Geitodoris planata =

Species of gastropod

Geitodoris planata is a species of sea slug or dorid nudibranch, a marine gastropod mollusk in the family Discodorididae.

== Taxonomy ==
It was originally described from Europe. Caribbean populations are morphologically similar but almost certainly distinct. Alvim & Pimenta (2013) regarded Caribbean animals as Geitodoris pusae (Er. Marcus, 1955), but no molecular studies have been conducted to compare animals from both sides of the Atlantic Ocean. Further research is necessary to clarify the status of this species.

== Distribution ==
Distribution of Geitodoris planata includes Mediterranean Sea, North Atlantic Ocean, North Sea, Western Atlantic: New Jersey, St. Lucia and Panama.

The type locality is "Lamlash Bay", Isle of Arran, Scotland.

== Description ==
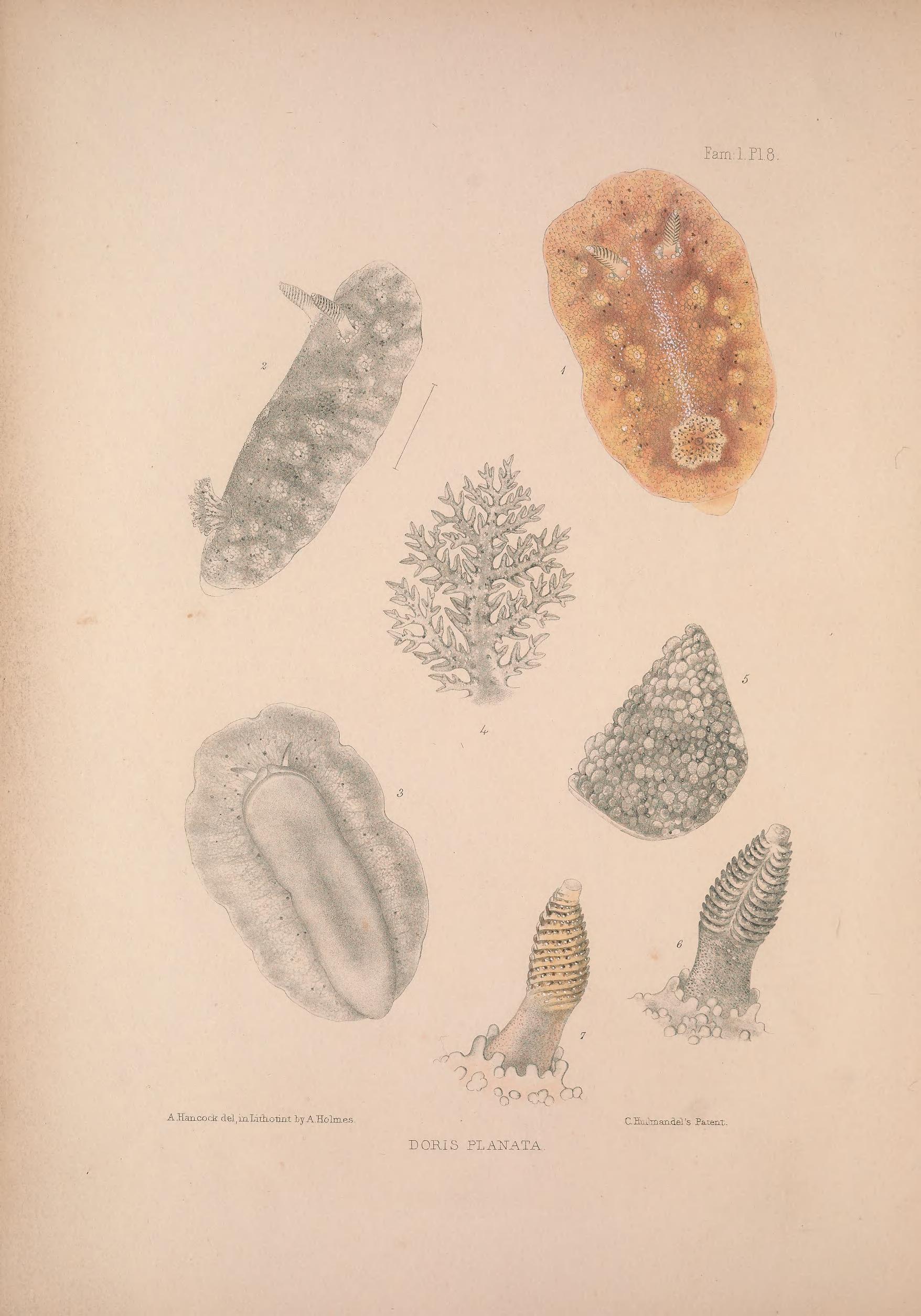
Drawing of Geitodoris planata by Albany Hancock published in 1847.

The body is oval. Mantle is rigid. Dorsum is covered by rounded, stalked tubercles. Background color is grayish-brown with some dark brown irregular patches. The color fades and becomes more translucent towards the mantle margin. Larger tubercles surrounded with opaque white pigment. Rhinophores and gill are usually the same color as the dorsum with white tips. The maximum recorded body length is 65 mm.

== Ecology ==
Minimum recorded depth is 91 m. Maximum recorded depth is 267 m. But this species apparently live also in more shallow water. It was found in coral rubble in a predominately sea grass habitat in Panama.

Its prey include sponges Hemimycale columella and Hymeniacidon perlevis.
