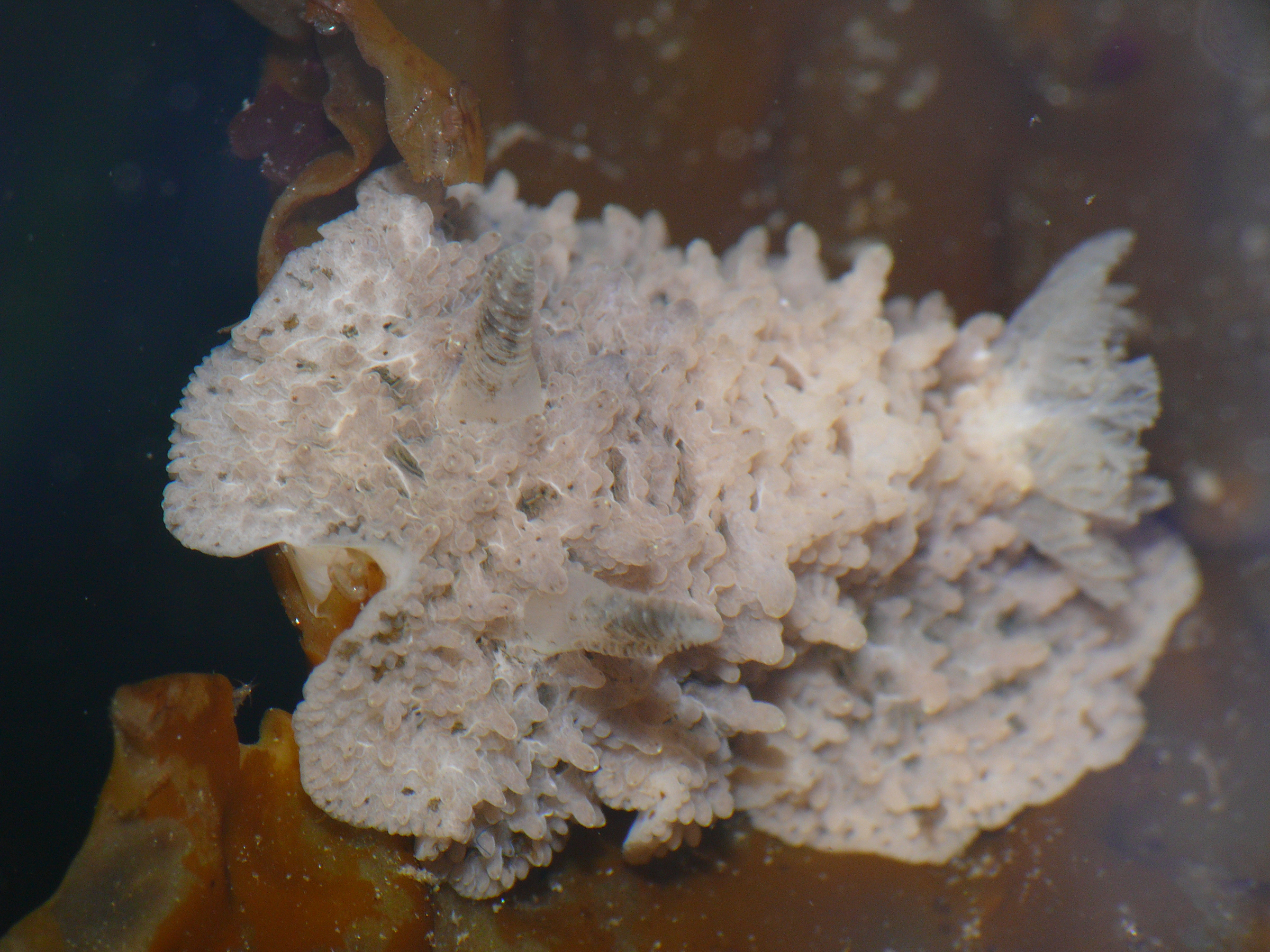

Scientific classification
- Kingdom: Animalia
- Phylum: Mollusca
- Class: Gastropoda
- Order: Nudibranchia
- Family: Discodorididae
- Genus: Sclerodoris
- Species: S. tanya

Binomial name
- Sclerodoris tanya (Ev. Marcus, 1971)

= Sclerodoris tanya =

Species of gastropod

Sclerodoris tanya is a species of sea slug, a dorid nudibranch, shell-less marine opisthobranch gastropod mollusc in the family Discodorididae.
