= Marionia pusa =

Scientific classification
- Kingdom: Animalia
- Phylum: Mollusca
- Class: Gastropoda
- Order: Nudibranchia
- Suborder: Tritoniacea
- Family: Tritoniidae
- Genus: Marionia
- Species: M. pusa

Binomial name
- Marionia pusa Er. Marcus & Ev. Marcus, 1968

Species of gastropod

Marionia pusa is a species of sea slug, a dendronotid nudibranch, a marine gastropod mollusc in the family Tritoniidae.

== Distribution ==
This species was described from Ivory Coast.
