= Marionia limceana =

Scientific classification
- Kingdom: Animalia
- Phylum: Mollusca
- Class: Gastropoda
- Order: Nudibranchia
- Suborder: Tritoniacea
- Family: Tritoniidae
- Genus: Marionia
- Species: M. limceana

Binomial name
- Marionia limceana F. V. Silva, de Meirelles & Matthews-Cascon, 2013

Species of gastropod

Marionia limceana is a species of sea slug, a dendronotid nudibranch, a marine gastropod mollusc in the family Tritoniidae.

== Distribution ==
This species was described from the South Atlantic Ocean.
