= Sclerodoris worki =

Scientific classification
- Domain: Eukaryota
- Kingdom: Animalia
- Phylum: Mollusca
- Class: Gastropoda
- Order: Nudibranchia
- Family: Discodorididae
- Genus: Sclerodoris
- Species: S. worki

Binomial name
- Sclerodoris worki (Ev. Marcus & Er. Marcus, 1967)

Synonyms
- Anisodoris worki Ev. Marcus & Er. Marcus, 196

Species of gastropod

Sclerodoris worki is a species of sea slug, a dorid nudibranch, shell-less marine opisthobranch gastropod mollusc in the family Discodorididae.

== Description ==
The maximum recorded body length is 50 mm.

== Ecology ==
Minimum recorded depth is 0 m. Maximum recorded depth is 0 m.
