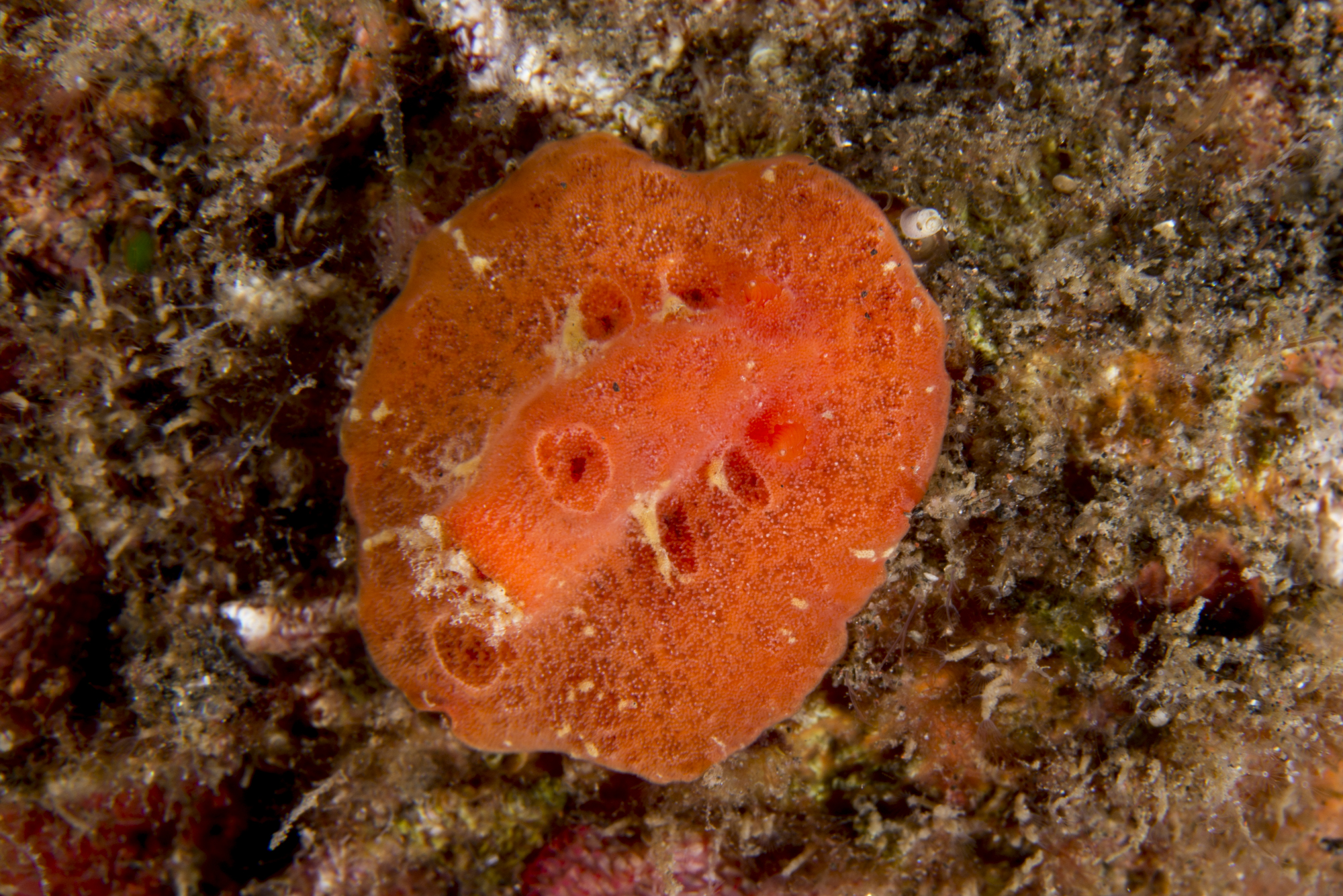
- Tulamben, Bali, Indonesia

Scientific classification
- Kingdom: Animalia
- Phylum: Mollusca
- Class: Gastropoda
- Order: Nudibranchia
- Family: Discodorididae
- Genus: Sclerodoris
- Species: S. tuberculata

Binomial name
- Sclerodoris tuberculata Eliot, 1904

Synonyms
- Doris castanea Kelaart, 1858

= Sclerodoris tuberculata =

Species of gastropod

Sclerodoris tuberculata is a species of sea slug, a dorid nudibranch, shell-less marine opisthobranch gastropod mollusc in the family Discodorididae.

== Distribution ==
This species was described from Prison Island, Zanzibar Harbour, Zanzibar, Tanzania. It is widely distributed in the Indo-Pacific Ocean.
