= Geitodoris pallida =

Scientific classification
- Kingdom: Animalia
- Phylum: Mollusca
- Class: Gastropoda
- Order: Nudibranchia
- Family: Discodorididae
- Genus: Geitodoris
- Species: G. pallida

Binomial name
- Geitodoris pallida Valdes, 2001

Species of gastropod

Geitodoris pallida is a species of sea slug or dorid nudibranch, a marine gastropod mollusk in the family Discodorididae.

== Distribution ==
Geitodoris pallida is found off the coast of New Caledonia.
