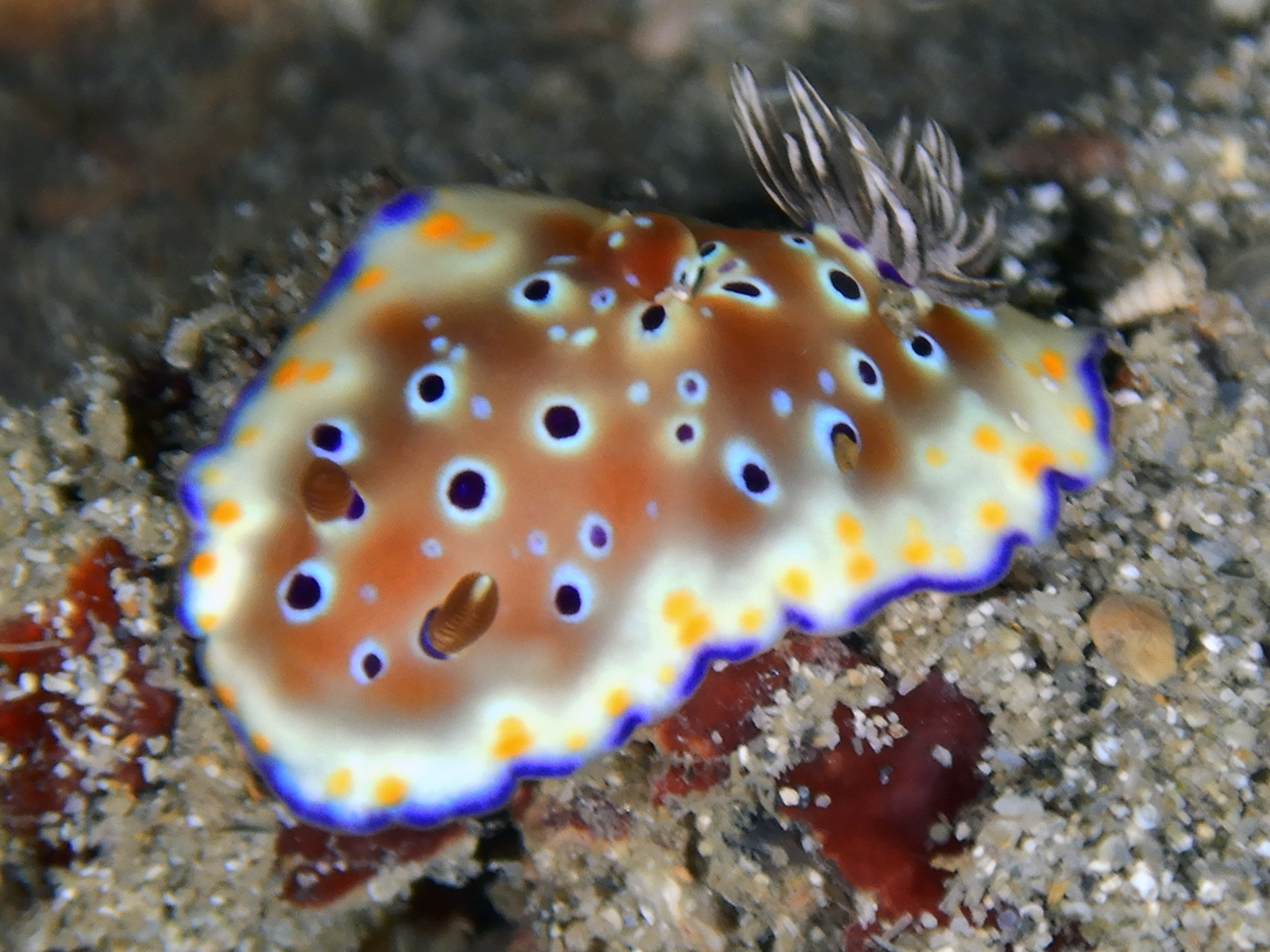

Scientific classification
- Kingdom: Animalia
- Phylum: Mollusca
- Class: Gastropoda
- Order: Nudibranchia
- Family: Chromodorididae
- Genus: Goniobranchus
- Species: G. tennentanus

Binomial name
- Goniobranchus tennentanus (Kelaart, 1859)

Synonyms
- Doris tennentana Kelaart, 1859 (basionym); Chromodoris tennentana (Kelaart, 1859); Glossodoris tennentana (Kelaart, 1859); Chromodoris vicina Eliot, 1904; Glossodoris vicina (Eliot, 1904)

= Goniobranchus tennentanus =

Gaudy chromodorid

Species of gastropod

Goniobranchus tennentanus (the gaudy chromodorid) is a species of colourful sea slug in the family Chromodorididae.

== Distribution ==
This species was described from Ceylon (Sri Lanka). It has also been reported from the following locations; East Africa, East Coast of South Africa, Tanzania and Chagos.

== Description ==
Kelaart's original description is as follows:

Body 1 inch long, white. Mantle white, with a faint bluish shade, and spangled with golden-coloured and purple spots. Margin caerulean blue. Dorsal tentacles clavate, purplish red, tipped with white, laminated. Branchial plumes red, numerous, 12 to 15, linear, bipinnated. Foot white, upper surface spotted with yellow. Oral tentacles white, with a yellow margin. Under surface of mantle white, with bluish reflexions.

Eliot's Chromodoris vicina is described as follows:

Mantle and foot bordered with light violet, the latter border a row of dots. Middle of back drab-brown with bright violet spots, the larger ones with a white centre. Near the edge of the mantle a number of yellow spots with white borders, which are often confluent. The foot deep and narrow, white with some yellow spots near the lower edge. The rhinophores dark brown with white tips. Each of the branchiae bore two black bands.

Most of the specimens identified as G. tennentanus are a good fit for Eliot's description of C. vicina, but it is possible that it is not really a synonym of G. tennentanus. In particular G. tennentanus is described as having a continuous sky blue margin, not purple, and red gills. C. vicina is up to 40 mm (1.6 in) long, with central region orange brown, mottled with lighter and darker patches and with dark purple spots, some with white centres, surrounded by white rings. The central area is surrounded by an irregular cream band which contains bright yellow spots. The margin is purple and somewhat discontinuous or broken into elongate spots.

== Similar species ==
This species has been confused with Goniobranchus cavae but differs in having yellow spots only within the cream band at the edge of the mantle, whilst in G. cavae these spots are all over the back.

== Habitat ==
Habitat: diverse, among shallow coral reefs.
