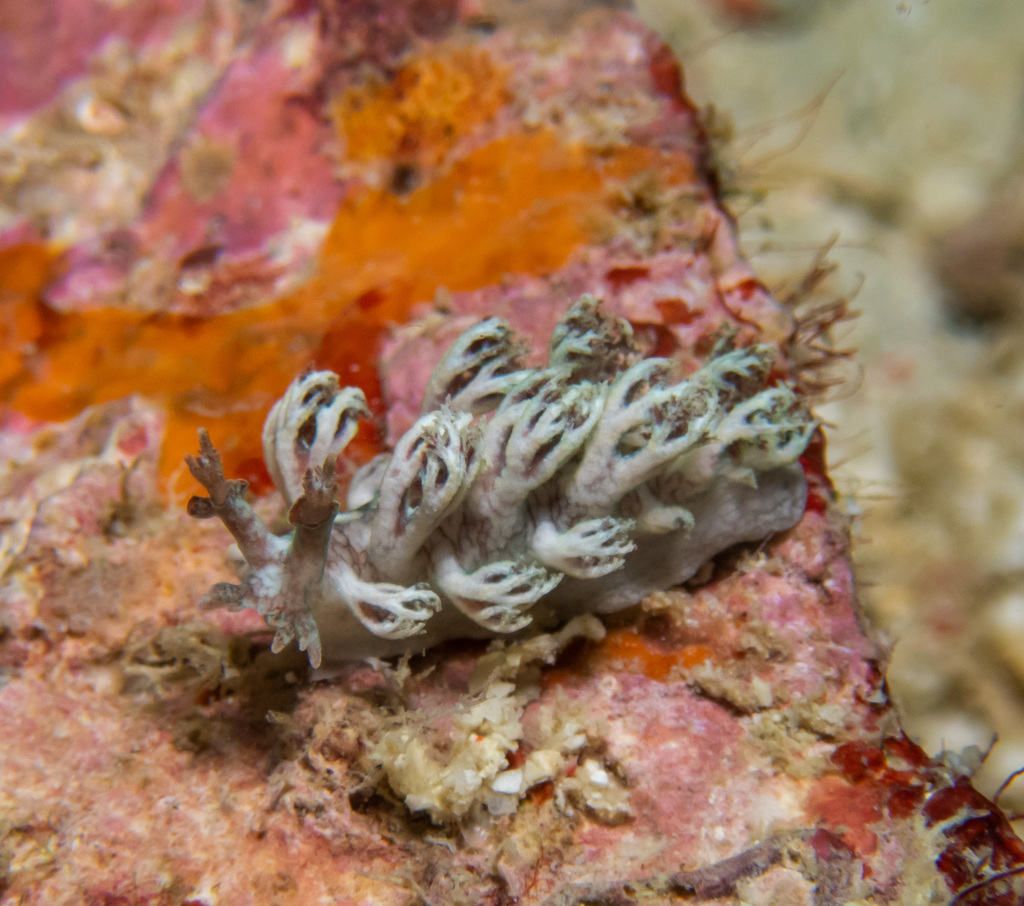

Scientific classification
- Kingdom: Animalia
- Phylum: Mollusca
- Class: Gastropoda
- Order: Nudibranchia
- Suborder: Tritoniacea
- Family: Tritoniidae
- Genus: Marionia
- Species: M. arborescens

Binomial name
- Marionia arborescens Bergh, 1890

= Marionia arborescens =

Species of gastropod

Marionia arborescens is a species of sea slug, a dendronotid nudibranch, a marine gastropod mollusc in the family Tritoniidae.

== Distribution ==
This species was described from Ambon Island, Indonesia. It has been reported from the Philippines.
