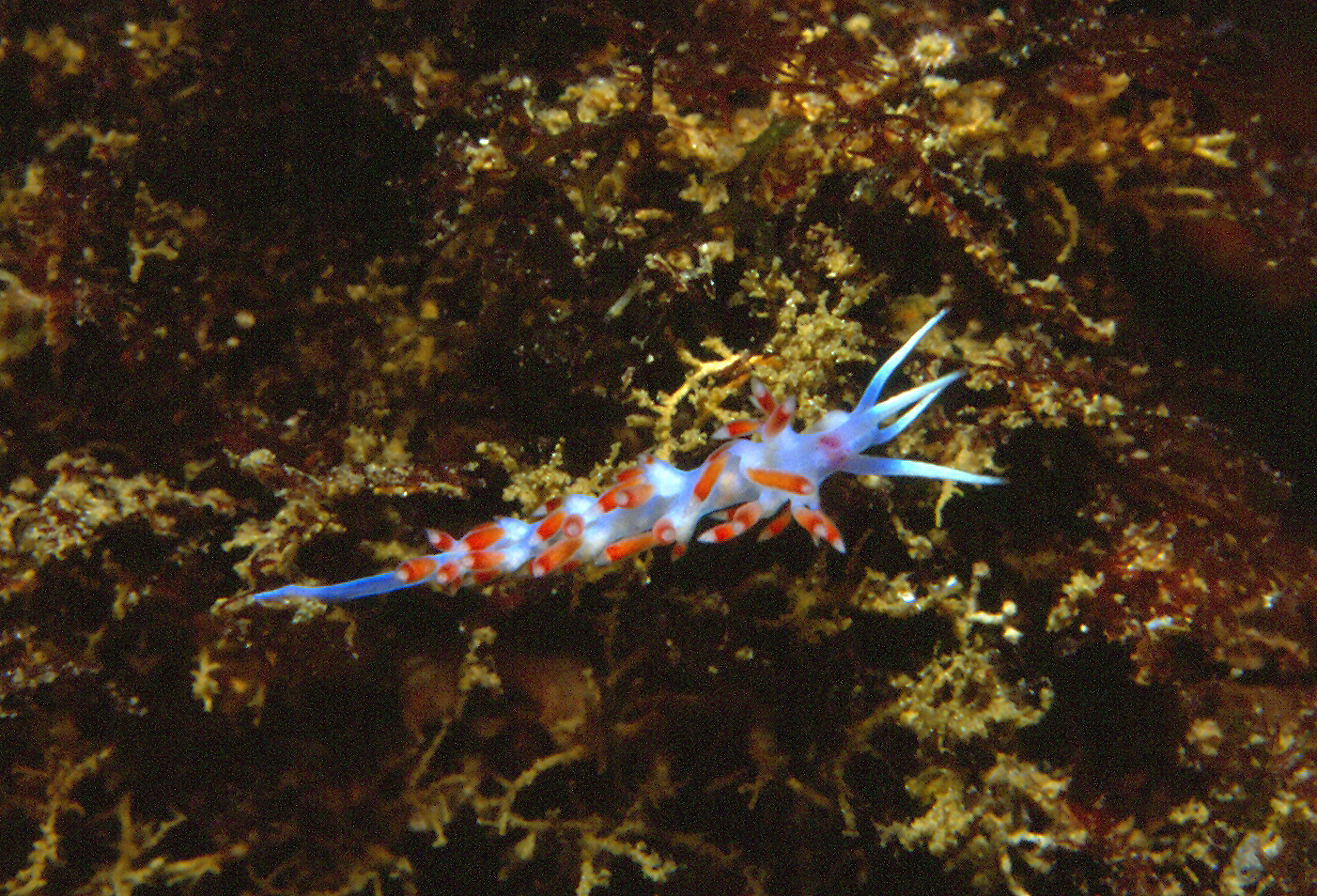

Scientific classification
- Kingdom: Animalia
- Phylum: Mollusca
- Class: Gastropoda
- Order: Nudibranchia
- Suborder: Aeolidacea
- Family: Flabellinidae
- Genus: Flabellina
- Species: F. cavolini

Binomial name
- Flabellina cavolini ( Vérany, 1846)

Synonyms
- Aeolis digitata A. Costa, 1866; Calmella cavolini (Vérany, 1846); Eolidia cavolini Vérany, 1846; Jojenia rubrobranchiata Aradas, 1847

= Flabellina cavolini =

Species of gastropod

Flabellina cavolini is a small aeolid (sea slug) in the family Flabellinidae.

== Description ==
F. cavolini maximum length of 12mm. It has smooth elongate rhinophores, oral tentacles, and angular anterior foot corners. Cerata, with a common stalk each, are arranged in groups. The front 3 ceratal clusters, which are on each side, are oppositely arranged but the posterior 3 ceratal clusters are arranged alternately. The color of digestive gland duct is bright red but the apical cnidosac is white in color. The jaw plates are purplish red and they show through each side of the slug's head as a reddish color spot.

== Distribution ==
Flabellina cavolini is found in the Mediterranean Sea and the North Atlantic Ocean, near Europe; mainly Spain and Portugal.

It was reported that it feeds on the hydroid, Eudendrium.
