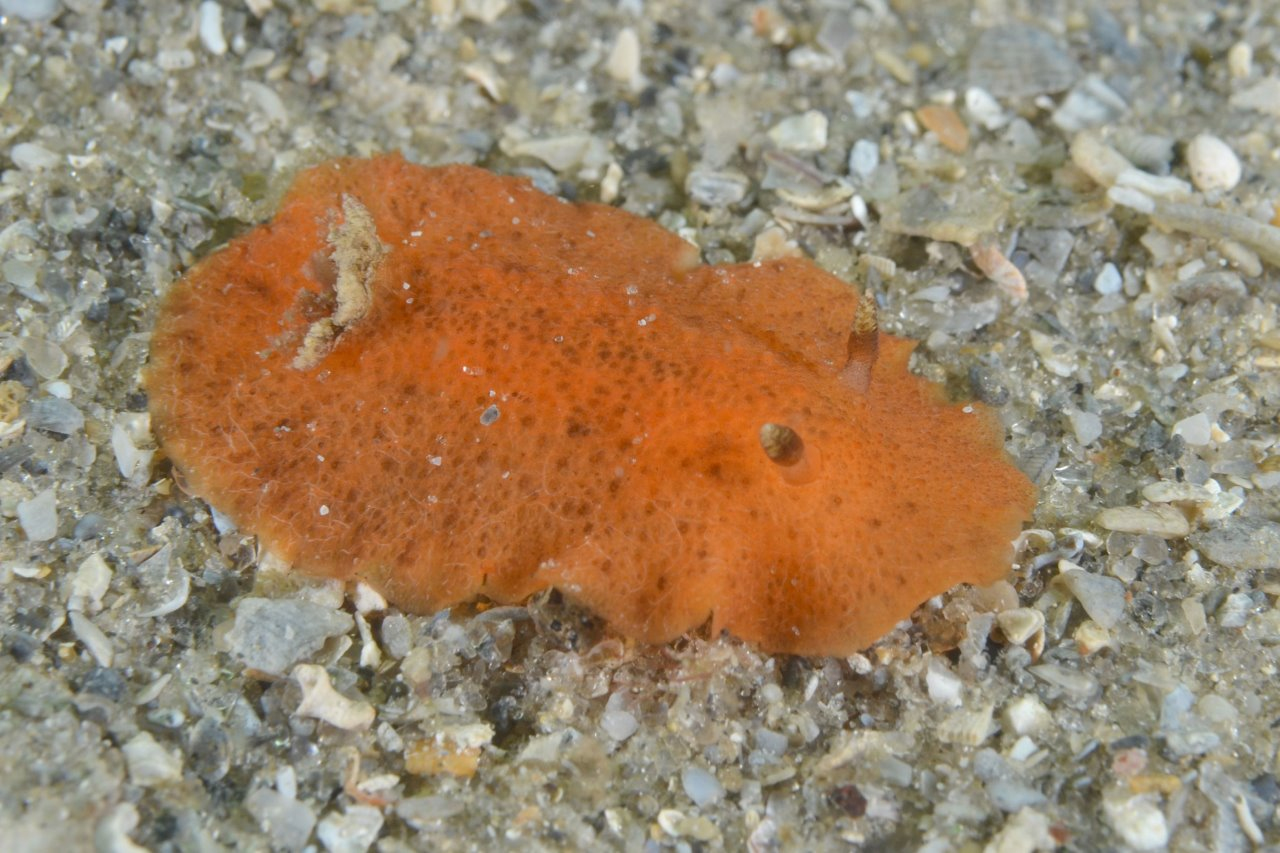

Scientific classification
- Kingdom: Animalia
- Phylum: Mollusca
- Class: Gastropoda
- Order: Nudibranchia
- Family: Discodorididae
- Genus: Geitodoris
- Species: G. pusae

Binomial name
- Geitodoris pusae (Er. Marcus, 1955)

= Geitodoris pusae =

Species of gastropod

Geitodoris pusae is a species of sea slug or dorid nudibranch, a marine gastropod mollusk in the family Discodorididae.

== Description ==
The maximum recorded body length is 60 mm.

== Ecology ==
Minimum recorded depth is 0 m. Maximum recorded depth is 68 m.
