= Friedrich Sigismund Leuckart =

German doctor and naturalist (1794–1843)

Friedrich Andreas Sigismund Leuckart (26 August 1794 – 25 August 1843) was a German medical doctor and naturalist.

He was born in Helmstedt in Lower Saxony and studied medicine at the University of Göttingen. From 1816 he made several voyages of exploration.

In 1823, Leuckart was appointed privatdozent at the University of Heidelberg and taught comparative anatomy, zoology, and veterinary science as an associate professor starting in 1829. In 1832 he moved to Freiburg as a full professor and continued teaching there.

Leuckart wrote works on marine invertebrates, in particular, Versuch einer naturgemaessen Eintheilung der Helminthen ("Towards a natural taxonomy of the helminths," 1827) and Einleitung in die Allgemeinen Naturgeschichte ("Introduction to general natural history," 1832).

Leuckart is commemorated by the parasitic worm species Calliobothrium leuckartii (Van Beneden, 1850).

He was the uncle of the zoologist Rudolf Leuckart (1822–1898).

== Bibliography ==
- Leuckart F .S. (1828). Breves animalium quorundam maxima ex parte marinorum descriptiones. (Latin: Brief descriptions of certain animals, mostly marine) Heidelberg, Oßwald, 24 pp., one unnumbered plate.

== References and external links ==
- Works by or about Friedrich Sigismund Leuckart at the Internet Archive
