= Charles Eliot (diplomat) =

British diplomat, colonial administrator and botanist

The Right Honourable Sir Charles Eliot GCMG CB
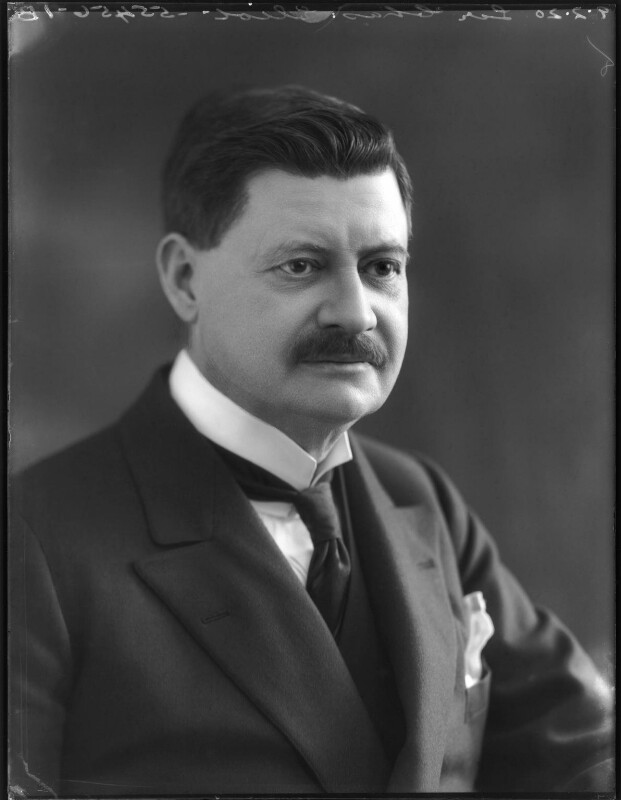

British Ambassador to Japan
- In office 1919–1925
- Monarch: George V
- Prime Minister: David Lloyd George; Bonar Law; Stanley Baldwin; Ramsay MacDonald
- Preceded by: Sir Conyngham Greene
- Succeeded by: Sir John Tilley

Vice-Chancellor of the University of Hong Kong
- In office 17 March 1912 – August 1918
- Succeeded by: Gregory Paul Jordan

Vice-Chancellor of the University of Sheffield
- In office 1905–1913
- Succeeded by: Herbert Fisher

Commissioner of the East Africa Protectorate
- In office 30 December 1900 – 20 May 1904
- Preceded by: Arthur Hardinge
- Succeeded by: Sir Donald Stewart

Personal details
- Born: 8 January 1862 Sibford Gower, Oxfordshire
- Died: 16 March 1931 (aged 69) Strait of Malacca
- Education: Cheltenham College; Balliol College, Oxford

Sir Charles Norton Edgcumbe Eliot GCMG CB PC (8 January 1862 – 16 March 1931) was a British diplomat, colonial administrator and botanist. He served as Commissioner of British East Africa in 1900–1904. He was British ambassador to Japan in 1919–1925.

He was also known as a malacologist and marine biologist. He described a number of sea slug species, including Chelidonura varians.

== Career ==
Eliot was born in the village of Sibford Gower near Banbury, Oxfordshire, England and educated at Cheltenham College and Balliol College, Oxford, where he took a double first in classical moderations and Greats, as well as winning the Craven, Ireland and Hertford scholarships. Remarkably, he also won the Boden Sanskrit Scholarship and the Houghton Syriac prize. He was a noteworthy linguist, with a full knowledge of 16 languages and conversant in 20 more.

Eliot served in diplomatic posts in Russia (1885), Morocco (1892), Turkey (1893), and Washington, D.C. (1899). He also served as British Commissioner in Samoa. He was appointed a Companion of the Order of the Bath (CB) in the 1898 Birthday Honours and was knighted as a Knight Commander of the Order of St Michael and St George (KCMG) in the New Year honours list 1 January 1900.

=== British East Africa ===
In 1900, he was appointed commissioner of British East Africa, and on 1 January 1902 he was appointed Commissioner, Commander-in-Chief and Consul-General for the East Africa Protectorate, including the mainland dominions of the Sultan of Zanzibar, and also as British Agent and Consul-General for the island dominions of the Sultan. In December 1902 he hosted the British colonial secretary (Joseph Chamberlain) during his tour of the African colonies.

In April 1902, the first application for land in British East Africa was made by the East Africa Syndicate – a company in which financiers belonging to the British South Africa Company were interested – which sought a grant of 500 square miles (1,300 km^{2}) sq. m., and this was followed by other applications for considerable areas, a scheme being also propounded for a large Jewish settlement (which was rejected by the world Jewish community). During 1903 the arrival of hundreds of prospective settlers, chiefly from South Africa, led to the decision to entertain no more applications for large areas of land, especially as questions were raised concerning the preservation for the Maasai of their rights of pasturage. In the 24 October 1903 edition of the Natal Witness, Eliot wrote: "There can be no doubt that the Maasai and many other tribes must go under. It is a prospect that I view with equanimity...I have no desire to protect Maasaidom...the sooner it disappears and it is unknown, except in books of anthropology, the better..." In April 1903, Major Frederick Russell Burnham, the famous American scout and then a Director of the East African Syndicate, sent an expedition consisting of John Weston Brooke, John Charles Blick, Mr. Bittlebank, and Mr. Brown, to assess the mineral wealth of the region. The party, known as the "Four B.'s", travelled from Nairobi via Mount Elgon northwards to the western shores of Lake Rudolph, experiencing plenty of privations from want of water, and of the danger from encounters with the Maasai.

In the carrying out of this policy of colonisation a dispute arose between Eliot and Lord Lansdowne, the British Foreign Secretary. Lansdowne, believing himself bound by pledges given to the East Africa Syndicate, decided that they should be granted the lease of the 500 square miles (1,300 km^{2}) they had applied for; but after consulting officials of the protectorate then in London, he refused Eliot permission to conclude leases for 50 square miles (130 km^{2}) each to two applicants from South Africa. Eliot thereupon resigned his post, and in a public telegram to the prime minister, dated Mombasa, 21 June 1904, gave as his reason:- "Lord Lansdowne ordered me to refuse grants of land to certain private persons while giving a monopoly of land on unduly advantageous terms to the East Africa Syndicate. I have refused to execute these instructions, which I consider unjust and impolitic." On the day Sir Charles sent this telegram, Sir Donald William Stewart, the chief commissioner of Ashanti (Ghana), was appointed his successor.

=== University administration ===
In 1905 Eliot was the first Vice-Chancellor of the newly created University of Sheffield. On 17 March 1912 he accepted the appointment to become the first Vice-Chancellor of the University of Hong Kong; he served there until he was recalled to the diplomatic service becoming high commissioner and consul-general in Siberia in August 1918.

=== Japan ===
He was the British ambassador to Japan in 1920–1926: though the position was not renewed, he stayed in Japan, studying the practice of Buddhism there. He regretted the 1921 decision to end the Anglo-Japanese alliance in 1923.

Taken ill with influenza, he decided to return to England but died on the journey on 16 March 1931 and was buried at sea in the Straits of Malacca. He never married.

== Selected works ==
In a statistical overview derived from writings by and about Sir Charles Eliot, OCLC/WorldCat encompasses roughly 106 works in 355 publications in 2 languages and 4,509 library holdings.

- The East Africa Protectorate (1905)
- Turkey in Europe. London: Edward Arnold. 1900 – via Internet Archive.
- Eliot, Charles Norton Edgcumbe (1911). "Asia" . Encyclopædia Britannica. Vol. 2 (11th ed.). pp. 734–756, see page 749. "History"
- Hinduism and Buddhism: An Historical Sketch. Vol. I. London: Edward Arnold & Co. 1921 – via Internet Archive.; Hinduism and Buddhism: An Historical Sketch. Vol. II. London: Edward Arnold & Co. 1921 – via Internet Archive.; Hinduism and Buddhism: An Historical Sketch. Vol. III. London: Edward Arnold & Co. 1921 – via Internet Archive.
- Japanese Buddhism (1935)
- A Finnish Grammar (1890)
- "Letters from the Far East" (1907)

=== Malacology ===
- 1900. Notes on tectibranchs and naked mollusks from Samoa. Proceedings of the Academy of Natural Science, Philadelphia, pp. 512–523, pl. 19.
- 1901. Notes on a remarkable nudibranch from north-west America. Proceedings of the Malacological Society of London 4(4):163-165.
- 1903. Eliot, C. N. E. (1903). "Notes on some new or little known members of the family Doridiidae". Proceedings of the Malacological Society of London. 5: 331–337.
- 1903a. On some nudibranchs from east Africa and Zanzibar, part II. Proceedings of the Zoological Society of London 1:250-257.
- 1903b. On some nudibranchs from east Africa and Zanzibar. Part III. Dorididae Cryptobranchiatae, I. Proceedings of the Zoological Society of London 2:354-385, pls. 22–24.
- 1904. Eliot, C. N. E. (1904). "On the Doris planata of Alder & Hancock". Journal of Molluscan Studies. 6 (3): 180–181. doi:10.1093/oxfordjournals.mollus.a066060.
- 1904a. On some nudibranchs from east Africa and Zanzibar. Part V. Proceedings of the Zoological Society of London 2:83-105, pls. 3–4.
- 1904b. On the Doris planata of Alder and Hancock. Proceedings of the Malacological Society of London 6(3):180-181.
- 1905. Note on Geitodoris planata (Alder & Hancock). Proceedings of the Malacological Society of London 6(4):186-187.
- 1905a. On some nudibranchs from the Pacific, including a new genus, Chromodoridella. Proceedings of the Malacological Society of London 6(4):229-238.
- 1905b. Notes on two rare British nudibranchs, Hero formosa, var. arborescens, and Staurodoris maculata. Proceedings of the Malacological Society of London 6(4):239-243.
- 1905c. On some nudibranchs from east Africa and Zanzibar. Part VI. Proceedings of the Zoological Society of London 2:268-298, pls. 16–17.
- 1905d. Eliot, Charles (1906). "XXII.—The Nudibranchiata of the Scottish National Antarctic Expedition". Transactions of the Royal Society of Edinburgh. 41 (3): 519–532. doi:10.1017/S0080456800035493. S2CID 82422085.
- 1905f. Nudibranchs from the Indo-Pacific. I. Notes on a collection dredged near Karachi and Maskat. Journal of Conchology 11(8):237-256.
- 1906. The genus Doriopsilla Bergh. Journal of Conchology 11(12):366-367.
- 1906a. On the nudibranchs of southern India and Ceylon, with special reference to the drawings by Kelaart and the collections belonging to Alder and Hancock preserved in the Hancock Museum at Newcastle upon Tyne. Proceedings of the Zoological Society of London, pp. 636–691, pls. 42–47.
- 1906b. On the nudibranchs of southern India and Ceylon, with special reference to the drawings by Kelaart and the collections belonging to Alder and Hancock preserved in the Hancock Museum at Newcastle upon Tyne.—No. 2. Proceedings of the Zoological Society of London, pp. 999–1008.
- 1906c. Notes on some British nudibranchs. Journal of the Marine Biological Association, new series, 7(3):333-382, pls. 11–12.
- 1906d. Report upon a collection of Nudibranchiata from the Cape Verde Islands, with notes by C. Crossland. Proceedings of the Malacological Society of London 7(3):131-159, pl. 14.
- 1906e. Nudibranchiata, with some remarks on the families and genera and description of a new genus, Doridomorpha, pp. 540–573, pl. 32. In: J. Stanley Gardiner (Ed.) The fauna and geography of the Maldive and Laccadive Archipelagoes, being the account of the work carried on and of the collections made by an expedition during the years 1899 and 1900, vol. 2.
- 1907. Nudibranchs from the Indo-Pacific. III. Journal of Conchology 12(3):81-92.
- 1907a. Nudibranchs from New Zealand and the Falkland Islands. Proceedings of the Malacological Society of London 7(6):327-361, pl. 28.
- 1907b. Mollusca. IV. Nudibranchiata. National Antarctic Expedition 1901–1904. Natural History 2:1-28, 1 pl.
- 1908. Eliot, Charles (1908). "On the Genus Cumanotus". Journal of the Marine Biological Association of the United Kingdom. 8 (3): 313–314. doi:10.1017/S0025315400073562. S2CID 88246866.
- 1908a. Eliot, Charles (1908). "Reports on the Marine Biology of the Sudanese Red Sea.-XI. Notes of a Collection of Nudibranchs from the Red Sea". Journal of the Linnean Society of London, Zoology. 31 (204): 86–122. doi:10.1111/j.1096-3642.1908.tb00457.x.
- 1909. Report on the nudibranchs collected by Mr. James Hornell at Okhamandal in Kattiawar in 1905–6. In: Report to the government of Baroda on the marine zoology of Okhamandal 1:137-145.
- 1909a. Notes on a collection of nudibranchs from Ceylon. Spolia Zeylanica. Colombo 6(23):79-95.
- 1909b. The Nudibranchiata of the Scottish National Antarctic Expedition. Report of the Scientific Results of the Voyage of S. Y. "Scotia" during the years 1902, 1903, and 1904, under the leadership of William S. Bruce, Volume V—Zoology, Part II, Nudibranchiata, pp. 11–24.
- 1910. Eliot, Charles N. E. (1910). "No. XVI.-NUDIBRANCHS COLLECTED BY Mr. STANLEY GARDINER FROM THE INDIAN OCEAN IN H.M.S. SEALARK". Transactions of the Linnean Society of London. 2nd Series: Zoology. 13 (3): 411–438. doi:10.1111/j.1096-3642.1910.tb00082.x.
- 1910a. "Notes on Nudibranchs from the Indian Museum". Records of the Indian Museum. 5: 247–252. 1910. doi:10.5962/bhl.part.10501. S2CID 160586167.
- 1910b. On some nudibranchs from the coast of Natal. Annals of the Natal Museum 2:221- 225.
- 1910d. A monograph of the British nudibranchiate Mollusca: with figures of the species. pt. VIII (supplementary). Figures by the late Joshua Alder and the late Albany Hancock, and others, pp. 1–198, pls. 1–8. Ray Society, London.
- 1911. Chromodorids from the Red Sea, collected and figured by Mr. Cyril Crossland. Proceedings of the Zoological Society of London, pp. 1068–1072, pl. 61.
- 1912. A note on the rare British nudibranch Hancockia eudactylota Gosse. Proceedings of the Zoological Society of London, p. 770, pl. 85.
- 1913. Japanese nudibranchs. Journal of the College of Science, Imperial University Tokyo 35:1-47, pls. 1–2.
- 1916. Mollusca Nudibranchiata. In: Fauna of the Chilka Lake. Memoirs of the Indian Museum 5:375-380.
- 1916a. Zoological results of a tour in the far east. Mollusca Nudibranchiata. Memoirs Asiatic Society Bengal 6
- with T. J. Evans. 1908. Doridoeides gardineri: a doridiform cladohepatic nudibranch. Quarterly Journal of Microscopical Science 52(2):279-299, pls. 15–16.

== Species ==
The World Register of Marine Species mentions 119 marine taxa named by Charles Eliot. Eliotia Vayssière, 1909, a nudibranch genus was named after him.

Species described by Charles Eliot include:

- Acanthodoris falklandica Eliot, 1907
- Bathydoris hodgsoni Eliot, 1907
- Bornella simplex Eliot, 1904
- Ceratophyllidia africana Eliot, 1903
- Cerberilla africana Eliot, 1903
- Chelidonura punctata Eliot, 1903
- Chelidonura varians Eliot, 1903
- Chromodoris africana Eliot, 1904
- Chromodoris cavae Eliot, 1904
- Chromodoris inconspicua Eliot, 1904
- Chromodoris splendens Eliot, 1904
- Crosslandia viridis Eliot, 1902
- Cuthona henrici Eliot, 1916
- Doridomorpha gardineri Eliot, 1903
- Doto antarctica Eliot, 1907
- Doto oscura Eliot, 1906
- Elysia chilkensis Eliot, 1916
- Elysia hendersoni Eliot, 1899
- Elysia japonica Eliot, 1913
- Ercolania zanzibarica Eliot, 1903
- Geitodoris reticulata Eliot, 1906
- Halgerda wasinensis Eliot, 1904
- Halgerda willeyi Eliot, 1904
- Lomanotus vermiformis Eliot, 1908
- Marionia levis Eliot, 1904
- Marionia viridescens Eliot, 1904
- Miamira magnifica Eliot, 1904
- Notaeolidia depressa Eliot, 1905
- Notaeolidia gigas Eliot, 1905
- Platydoris pulchra Eliot, 1904
- Sclerodoris coriacea Eliot, 1904
- Sclerodoris minor Eliot, 1904
- Sclerodoris tuberculata Eliot, 1904
- Thordisa burnupi Eliot, 1910
- Tritoniella belli Eliot, 1907

== See also ==
- List of Ambassadors from the United Kingdom to Japan
- Anglo-Japanese relations
- Buddhism in Japan
- Edward Carlyon Eliot
- Charles William Eliot

== Notes ==
Political offices
Preceded by Sir Arthur Henry Hardinge	Governor of Kenya; 1900–1904	Succeeded by Sir Donald William Stewart
Academic offices
Preceded by New position	Vice-Chancellor of the University of Sheffield; 1905–1912	Succeeded by Herbert Fisher
Preceded by New position	Vice-Chancellor of the University of Hong Kong; 1912–1918	Succeeded by G. P. Jordan
Diplomatic posts
Preceded by Sir Conyngham Greene	British Ambassador to Japan; 1919–1925	Succeeded by Sir John Tilley
