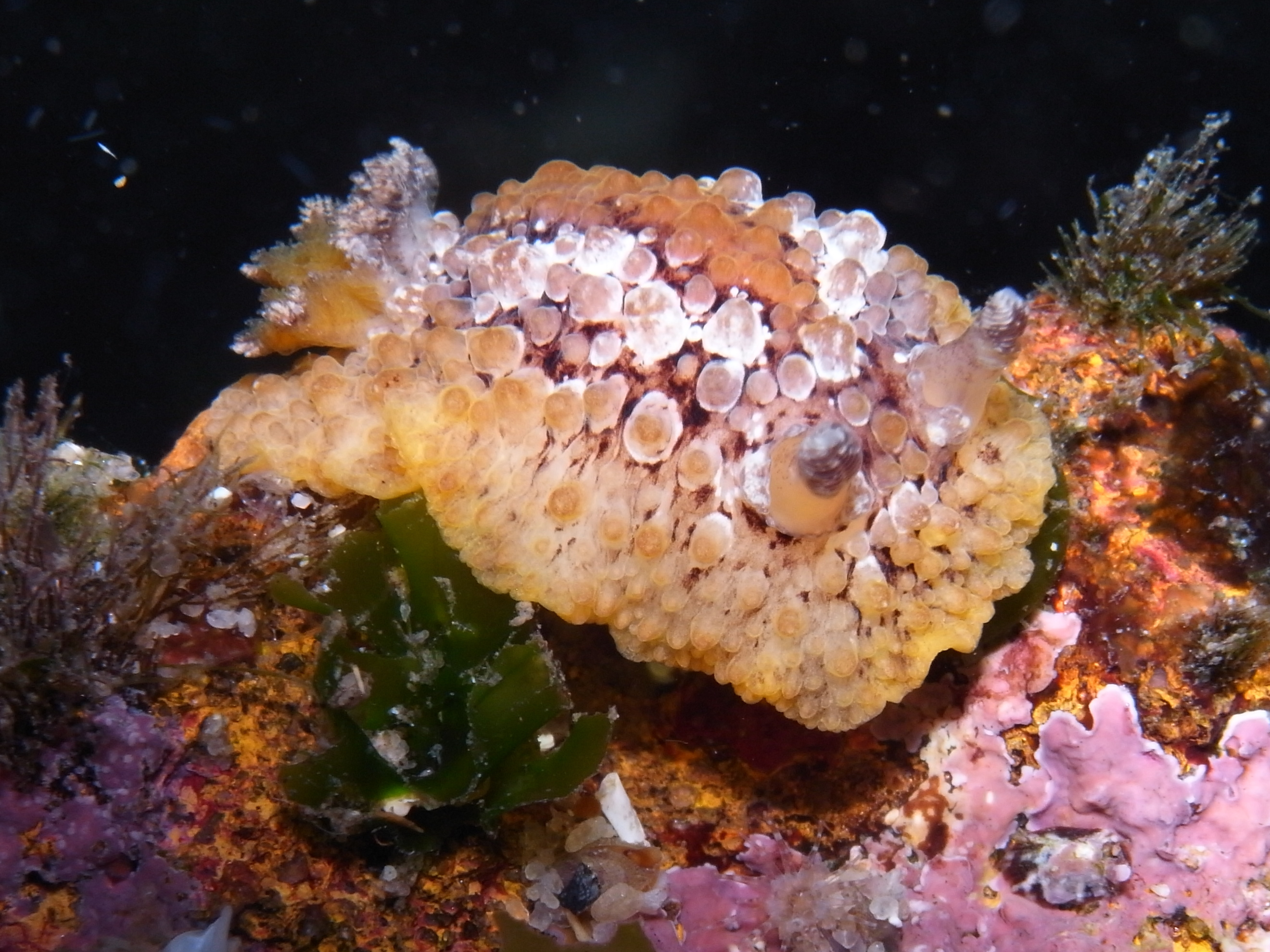
- Hoplodoris nodulosa

Scientific classification
- Kingdom: Animalia
- Phylum: Mollusca
- Class: Gastropoda
- Order: Nudibranchia
- Family: Discodorididae
- Genus: Hoplodoris; Bergh, 1880

= Hoplodoris =

Genus of gastropods

Hoplodoris is a genus of sea slugs, dorid nudibranchs, shell-less marine gastropod molluscs in the family Discodorididae.

== Species ==
The following species are recognised in the genus Hoplodoris:

- Hoplodoris balbon Donohoo & Gosliner, 2020
- Hoplodoris desmoparypha Bergh, 1880
- Hoplodoris rosans Donohoo & Gosliner, 2020

=== Former species ===
- Hoplodoris armata (Baba, 1993) synonymized with Carminodoris armata Baba, 1993
- Hoplodoris bifurcata (Baba, 1993) synonymized with Carminodoris bifurcata Baba, 1993
- Hoplodoris bramale Fahey & Gosliner, 2003 synonymized with Carminodoris bramale (Fahey & Gosliner, 2003)
- Hoplodoris estrelyado Gosliner & Behrens, 1998 synonymized with Carminodoris estrelyado (Gosliner & Behrens, 1998)
- Hoplodoris flammea Fahey & Gosliner, 2003 synonymized with Carminodoris flammea (Fahey & Gosliner, 2003)
- Hoplodoris grandiflora (Pease, 1860) synonymized with Carminodoris grandiflora (Pease, 1860)
- Hoplodoris hansrosaorum Dominguez, F. J. García & Troncoso, 2006 synonymized with Carminodoris hansrosaorum (Dominguez, F. J. García & Troncoso, 2006)
- Hoplodoris madibenthos Ortea, 2016 synonymized with Carminodoris madibenthos (Ortea, 2016)
- Hoplodoris nodulosa (Angas, 1864) synonymized with Carminodoris nodulosa (Angas, 1864)
- Hoplodoris novaezelandiae (Bergh, 1904) synonymized with Carminodoris nodulosa (Angas, 1864)
