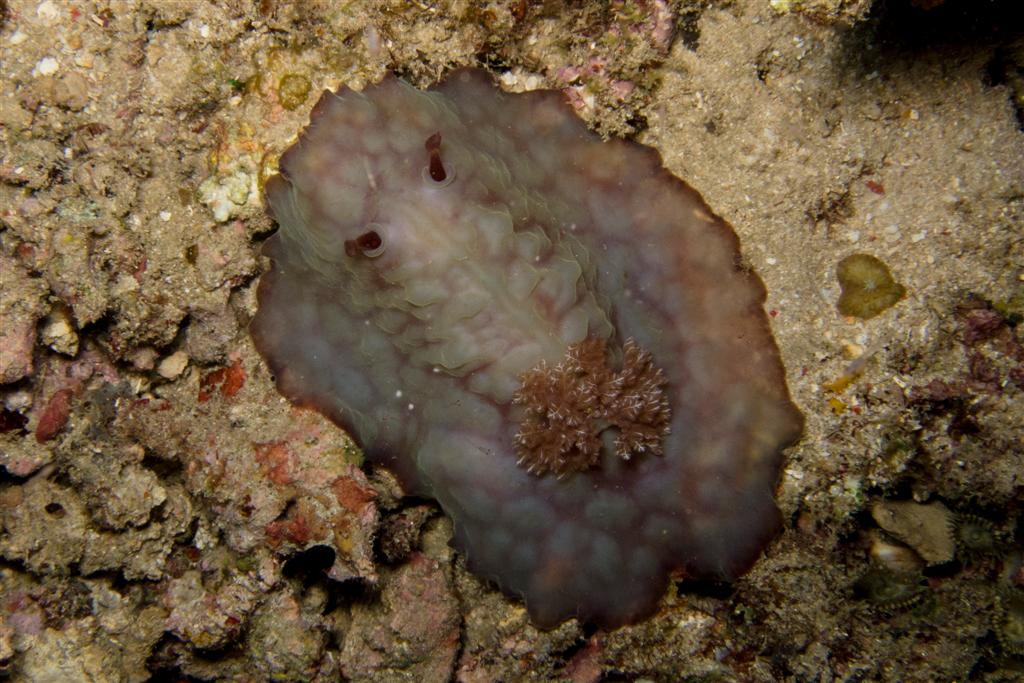

Scientific classification
- Kingdom: Animalia
- Phylum: Mollusca
- Class: Gastropoda
- Order: Nudibranchia
- Family: Discodorididae
- Genus: Asteronotus
- Species: A. hepaticus

Binomial name
- Asteronotus hepaticus (Abraham, 1877)

Synonyms
- Doris hepatica Abraham, 1877

= Asteronotus hepaticus =

Species of gastropod

Asteronotus hepaticus is a species of sea slug or dorid nudibranch, a marine gastropod mollusk in the family Discodorididae.

== Distribution ==
This species was originally described from the Pacific Ocean. It is known from Vanuatu, Indonesia, the Solomon Islands and Papua New Guinea.

== Description ==
Asteronotus hepaticus is a large dorid nudibranch with a distinctive deep purple colouration.
