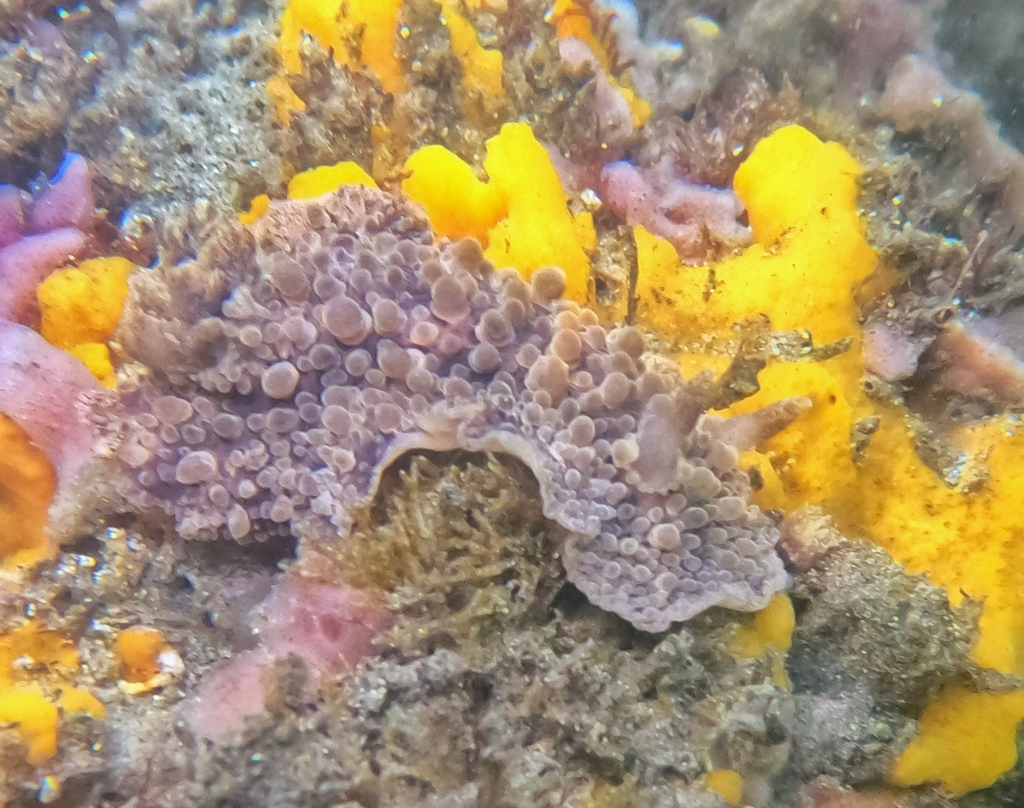

Scientific classification
- Kingdom: Animalia
- Phylum: Mollusca
- Class: Gastropoda
- Order: Nudibranchia
- Family: Discodorididae
- Genus: Carminodoris
- Species: C. bramale

Binomial name
- Carminodoris bramale (Fahey & Gosliner, 2003)

Synonyms
- Hoplodoris bramale Fahey & Gosliner, 2003

= Carminodoris bramale =

Species of gastropod

Carminodoris bramale is a species of sea slug, a dorid nudibranch, a marine gastropod mollusc in the family Discodorididae.

== Distribution ==
This species is recorded from the Pacific coast of Costa Rica.
