= Asteronotus mabilla =

Scientific classification
- Kingdom: Animalia
- Phylum: Mollusca
- Class: Gastropoda
- Order: Nudibranchia
- Family: Discodorididae
- Genus: Asteronotus
- Species: A. mabilla

Binomial name
- Asteronotus mabilla (Abraham, 1877)

Synonyms
- Doris mabilla Abraham, 1877

Species of gastropod

Asteronotus mabilla is a species of sea slug or dorid nudibranch, a marine gastropod mollusk in the family Discodorididae.

== Distribution ==
This species was originally described from the Seychelles and Samoa. It has been reported from Madagascar.
