= Carminodoris boucheti =

Scientific classification
- Kingdom: Animalia
- Phylum: Mollusca
- Class: Gastropoda
- Order: Nudibranchia
- Family: Discodorididae
- Genus: Carminodoris
- Species: C. boucheti

Binomial name
- Carminodoris boucheti Ortea, 1979

Species of gastropod

Carminodoris boucheti is a species of sea slug or dorid nudibranch, a marine gastropod mollusk in the family Discodorididae.

== Distribution ==
Carminodoris boucheti is found of the southern coast of Spain, near Gibraltar.
