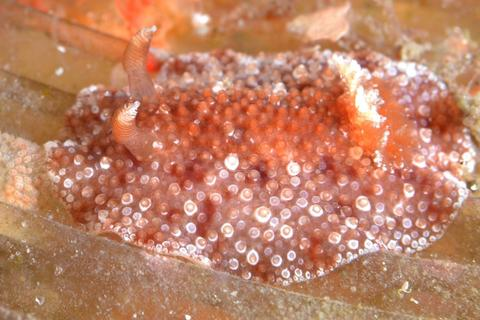

Scientific classification
- Kingdom: Animalia
- Phylum: Mollusca
- Class: Gastropoda
- Order: Nudibranchia
- Family: Discodorididae
- Genus: Carminodoris
- Species: C. hansrosaorum

Binomial name
- Carminodoris hansrosaorum (Dominguez, Garcia & Troncoso, 2006)

Synonyms
- Hoplodoris hansrosaorum Dominguez, Garcia & Troncoso, 2006

= Carminodoris hansrosaorum =

Species of gastropod

Carminodoris hansrosaorum is a species of sea slug, a dorid nudibranch, a marine gastropod mollusc in the family Discodorididae.

== Distribution ==
This species was described from the intertidal zone, Ilha de Cabo Frio, Arraial do Cabo, Brazil. It has subsequently been reported from Florida and Bonaire.
