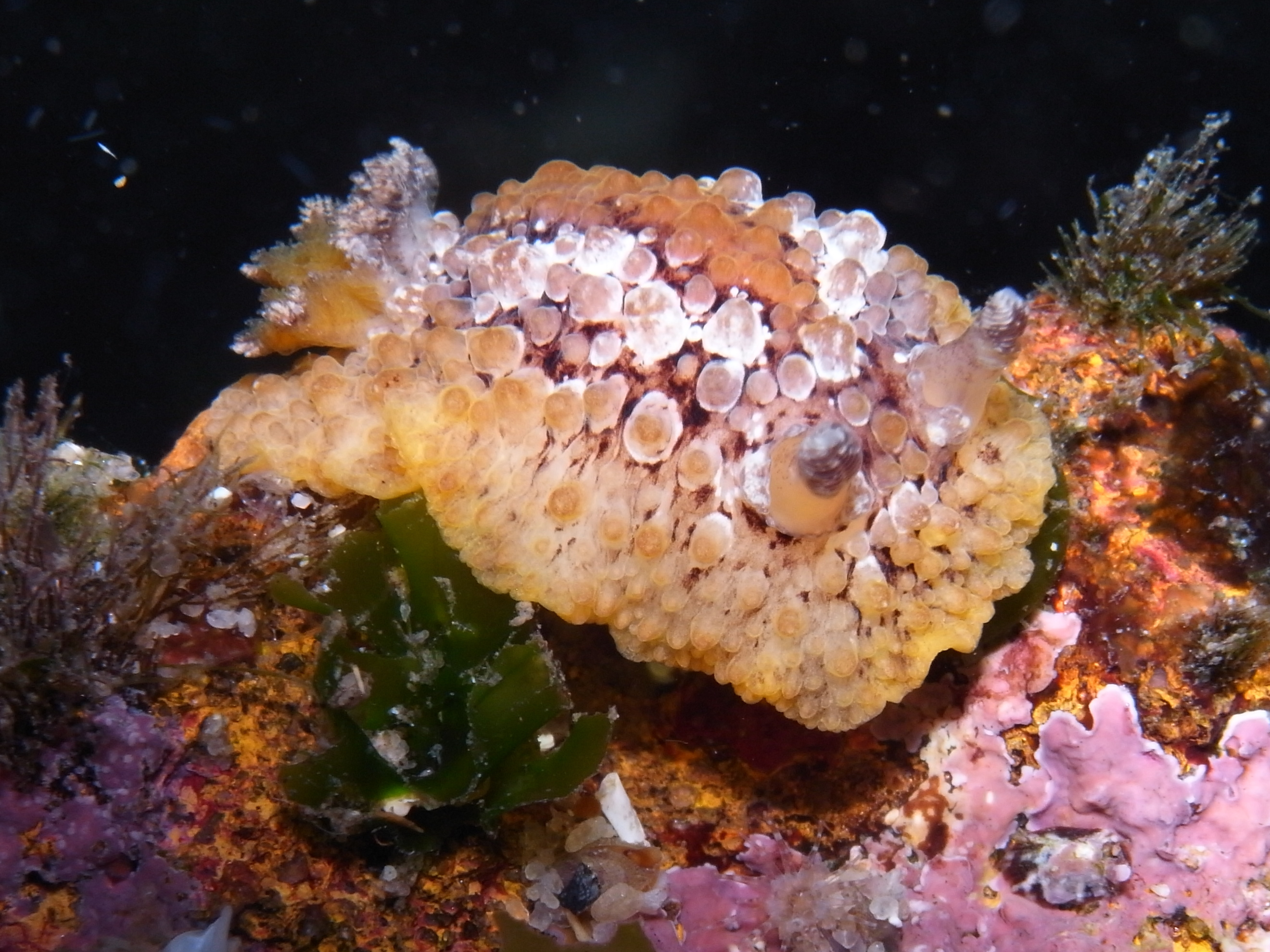

Scientific classification
- Kingdom: Animalia
- Phylum: Mollusca
- Class: Gastropoda
- Order: Nudibranchia
- Family: Discodorididae
- Genus: Carminodoris
- Species: C. nodulosa

Binomial name
- Carminodoris nodulosa (Angas, 1864)

Synonyms
- List: Doris nodulosa Angas, 1864; Doris pustulata Abraham, 1877; Hoplodoris nodulosa (Angas, 1864); Homoeodoris novzealandiae Bergh, 1904; Homoiodoris novaezelandiae Bergh, 1904; Hoplodoris novaezelandiae (Bergh, 1904); Staurodoris pustulata (Abraham, 1877)

= Carminodoris nodulosa =

Species of gastropod

Carminodoris nodulosa is a species of sea slug, a dorid nudibranch, a marine gastropod mollusc in the family Discodorididae.

== Distribution ==
This species is recorded from the western Pacific including southern Australia from New South Wales to Western Australia and throughout New Zealand.
