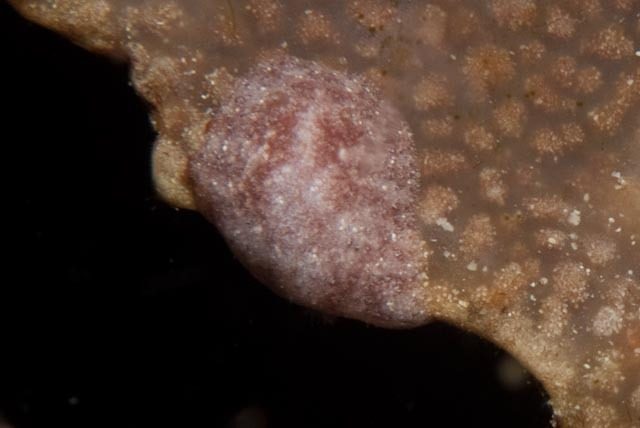

Scientific classification
- Kingdom: Animalia
- Phylum: Mollusca
- Class: Gastropoda
- Order: Nudibranchia
- Family: Discodorididae
- Genus: Asteronotus
- Species: A. mimeticus

Binomial name
- Asteronotus mimeticus Gosliner & Valdes, 2002

= Asteronotus mimeticus =

Species of gastropod

Asteronotus mimeticus is a species of sea slug or dorid nudibranch, a marine gastropod mollusk in the family Discodorididae.

== Distribution ==
The holotype of this species was described from Luzon Island, Philippines. Additional specimens included in the original description were from elsewhere in the Philippines, Palau, Papua New Guinea, Australia and Bali, Indonesia. It is also known from Malaysia.

== Ecology ==
Asteronotus mimeticus is found on the underside of blades of the leafy sponge Phyllospongia lamellosa and other sponges with flattened blades.
