= Otinodoris =

Scientific classification
- Kingdom: Animalia
- Phylum: Mollusca
- Class: Gastropoda
- Order: Nudibranchia
- Family: Discodorididae
- Genus: Otinodoris; White, 1948

Genus of gastropods

Otinodoris is a genus of sea slugs, dorid nudibranchs, shell-less marine gastropod mollusks previously placed in the family Chromodorididae. It is now considered a synonym of Asteronotus Ehrenberg, 1831 and placed in the family Discodorididae

Valdés (2002) tentatively tried to maintain Otinodoris as a separate genus, but lacked the necessary data. It was then considered possible that Otinodoris was a synonym of Peltodoris Bergh, 1880.

It is now considered a synonym of Asteronotus Ehrenberg, 1831 and placed in the family Discodorididae

== Species ==
Species in the genus Otinodoris include:

- Otinodoris winckworthi White, 1948 : synonym of Asteronotus raripilosa (Abraham, 1877)
