= Asteronotus spongicolus =

Scientific classification
- Kingdom: Animalia
- Phylum: Mollusca
- Class: Gastropoda
- Order: Nudibranchia
- Family: Discodorididae
- Genus: Asteronotus
- Species: A. spongicolus

Binomial name
- Asteronotus spongicolus Gosliner & Valdes, 2002

Species of gastropod

Asteronotus spongicolus is a species of sea slug or dorid nudibranch, a marine gastropod mollusk in the family Discodorididae.

== Distribution ==
This species was described from Zanzibar, Tanzania with additional material from the mainland coast of Tanzania and also from Lizard Island, North Queensland, Australia. It is also known from Malaysia and the Philippines.

== Ecology ==
Asteronotus spongicolus feeds on the leafy sponge Carteriospongia sp. and is well camouflaged on the undersides of the sponge blades.
