= Carminodoris spinobranchialis =

Scientific classification
- Kingdom: Animalia
- Phylum: Mollusca
- Class: Gastropoda
- Order: Nudibranchia
- Family: Discodorididae
- Genus: Carminodoris
- Species: C. spinobranchialis

Binomial name
- Carminodoris spinobranchialis Ortea & Martínez, 1992

Species of gastropod

Carminodoris spinobranchialis is a species of sea slug or dorid nudibranch, a marine gastropod mollusk in the family Discodorididae.
