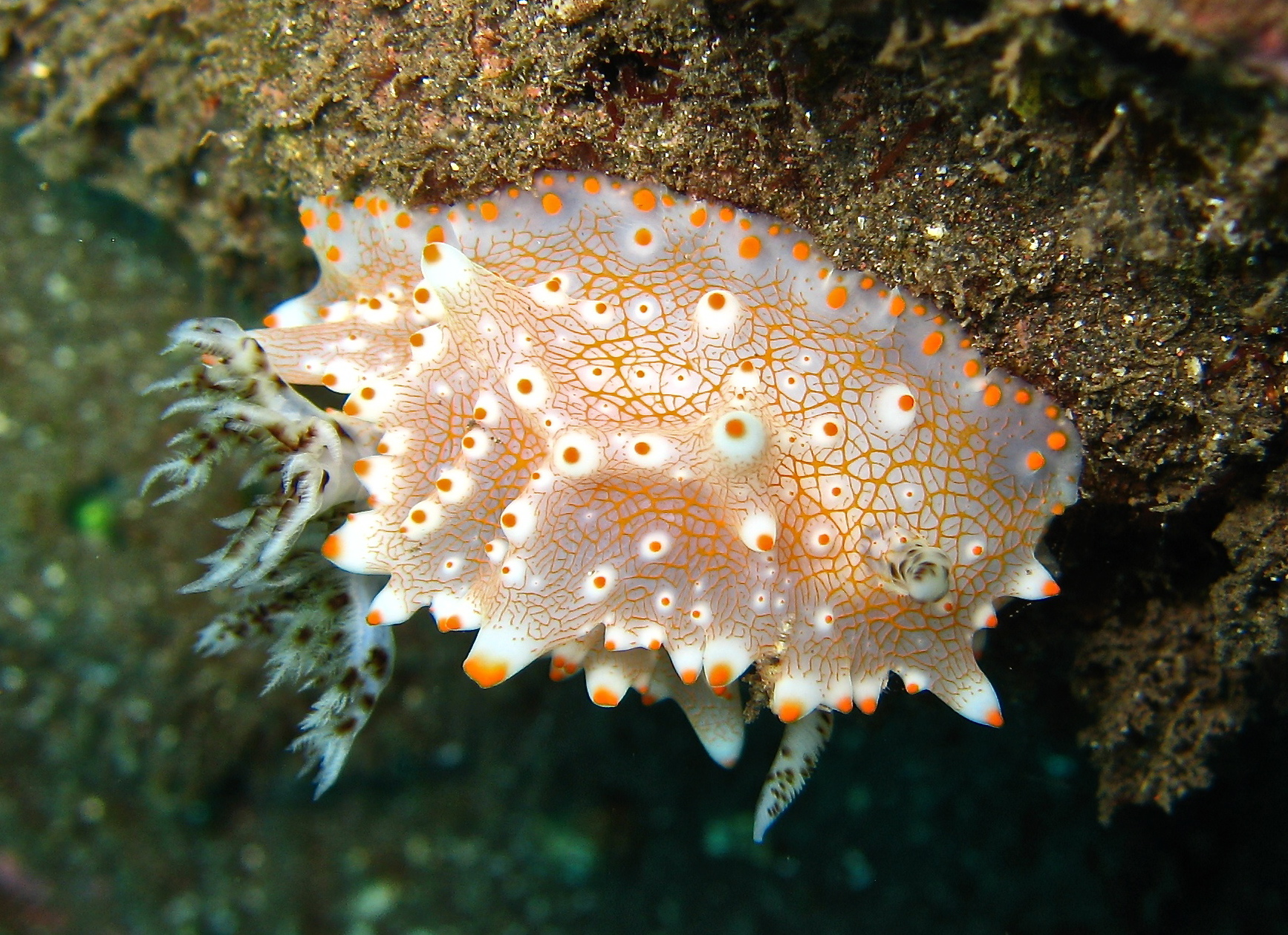
- Halgerda batangas in Tulamben, Bali

Scientific classification
- Kingdom: Animalia
- Phylum: Mollusca
- Class: Gastropoda
- Order: Nudibranchia
- Family: Discodorididae
- Genus: Halgerda
- Species: H. batangas

Binomial name
- Halgerda batangas Carlson & Hoff, 2000

= Halgerda batangas =

Species of gastropod

Halgerda batangas is a species of sea slug, a dorid nudibranch, a shell-less marine gastropod mollusk in the family Discodorididae.

== Distribution ==
This species was described from the Philippines, with a holotype specimen measuring 40 mm in length, alive, from Mactan Island, Cebu and a paratype measuring 35 mm from Anilao, Batangas. It is found in the tropical western Pacific, including: Indonesia, Philippines, Solomon Islands, Mabul, New Britain, Davao Gulf, Malaysia, Papua New Guinea, Sulawesi, Great Barrier Reef and Taiwan.

== Description ==
This animal is one of a group of mainly white species of Halgerda with orange markings. It is characterized by a network of fine, solid, red-orange lines on the mantle. It has a white band around the mantle containing low rounded orange-capped tubercles. The mantle tubercles range in size from small rounded bumps to tall, prominent structures.

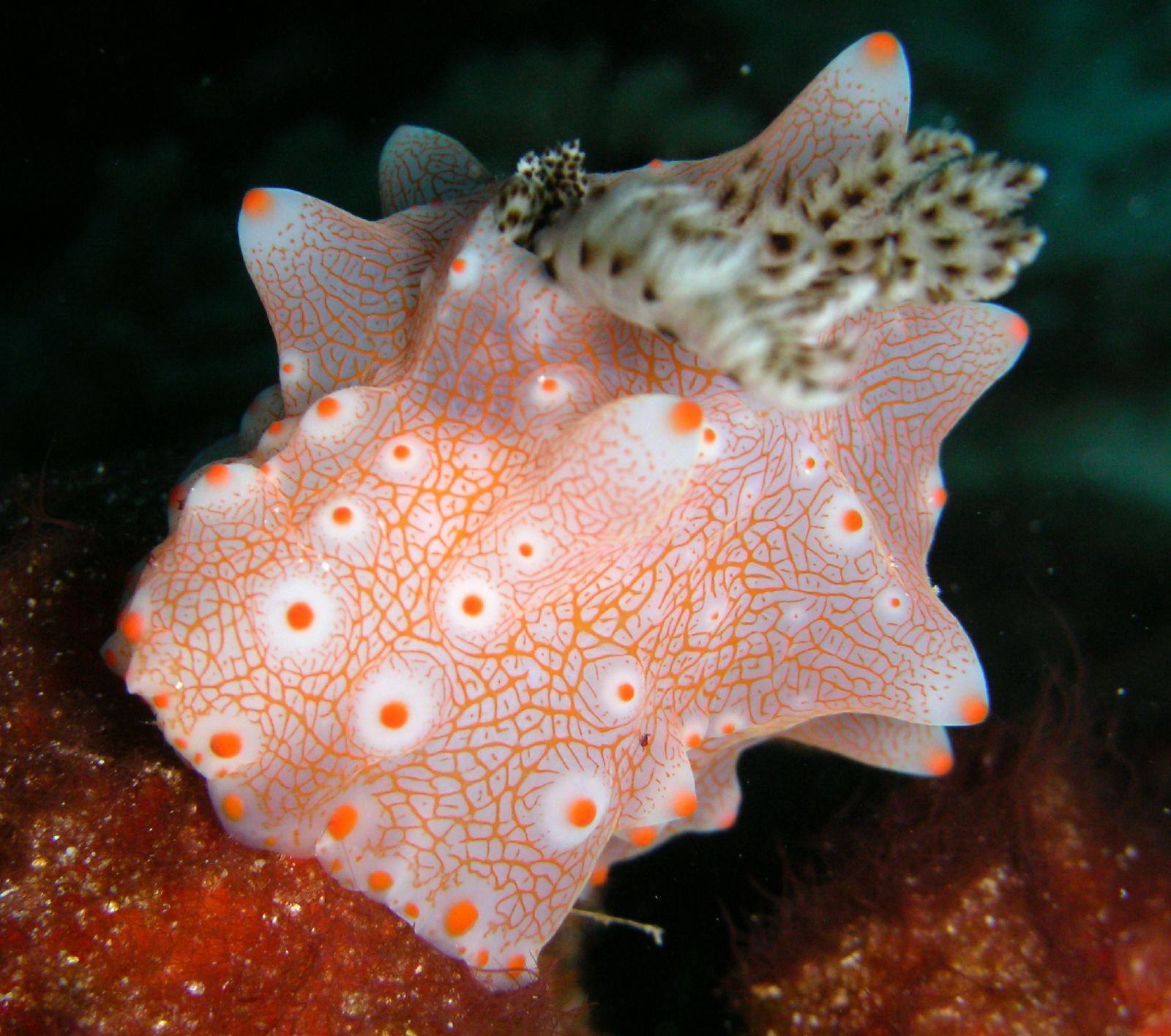
Halgerda batangas

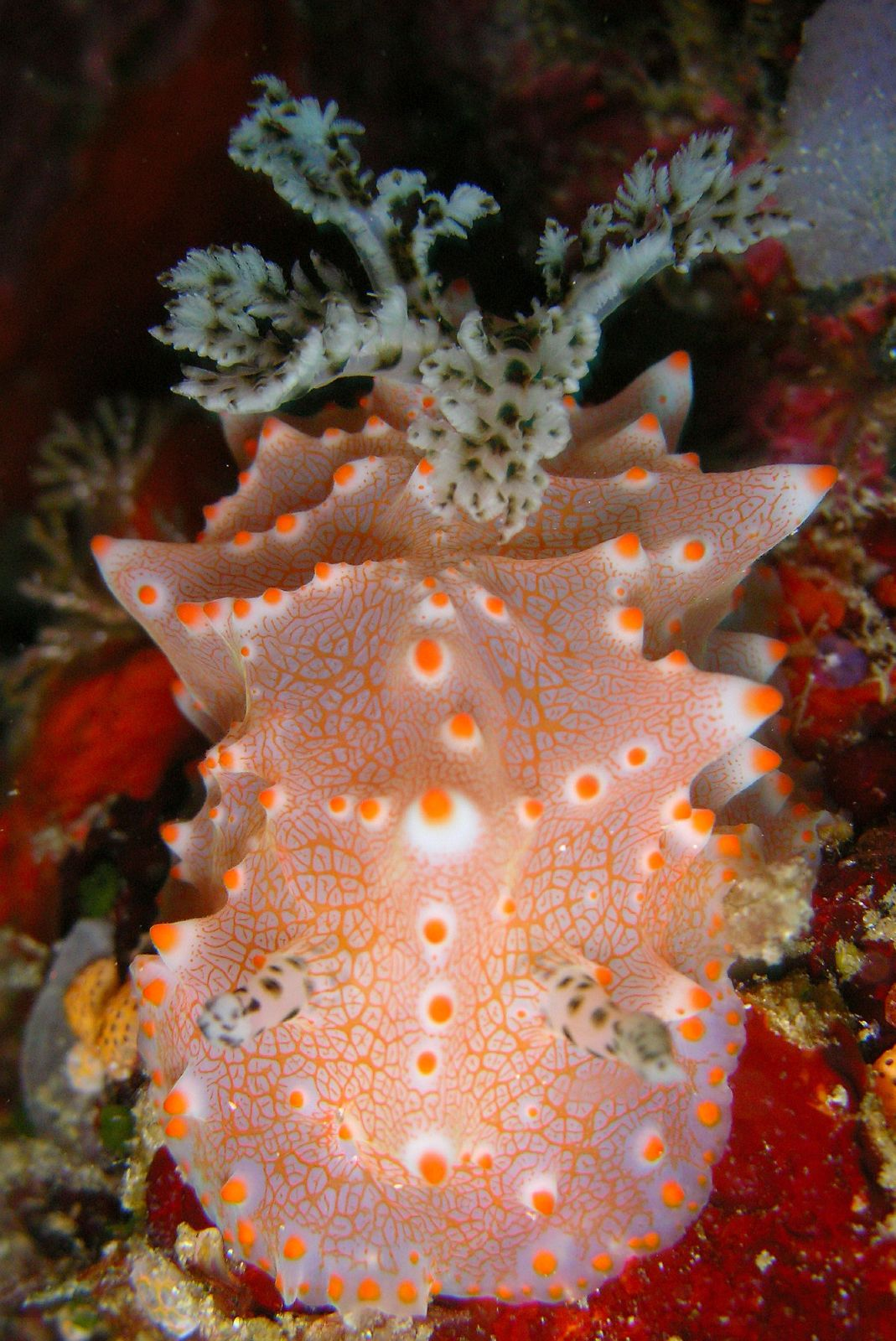
Halgerda batangas
