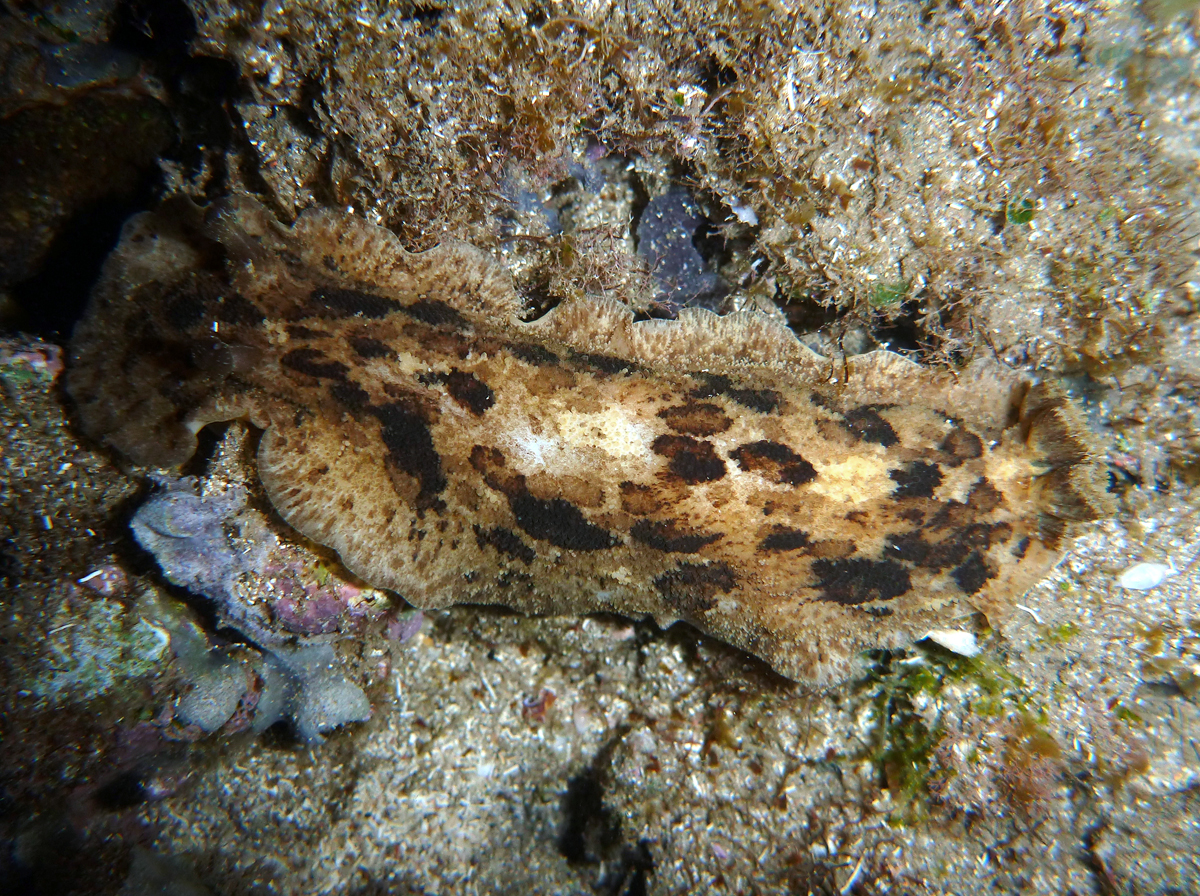

Scientific classification
- Kingdom: Animalia
- Phylum: Mollusca
- Class: Gastropoda
- Order: Nudibranchia
- Family: Discodorididae
- Genus: Sebadoris; Er. Marcus & Ev. Marcus, 1960

Type species
- Thordisa crosslandi Eliot, 1903

= Sebadoris =

Genus of gastropods

Sebadoris is a genus of sea slugs, dorid nudibranchs, shell-less marine gastropod molluscs in the family Discodorididae.

== Species ==
Species in the genus Sebadoris include:

- Sebadoris fragilis (Alder & Hancock, 1864)
- Sebadoris nubilosa Pease, 1871
