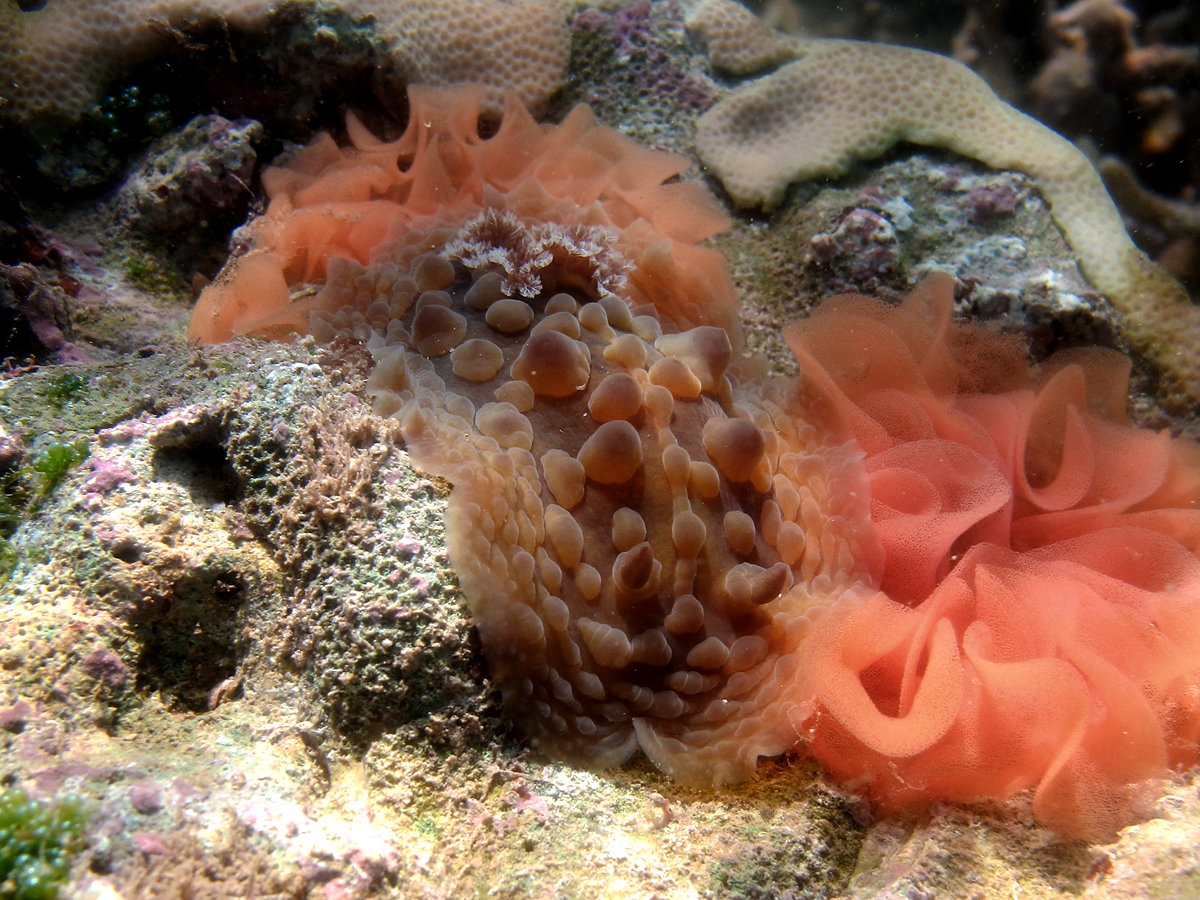

Scientific classification
- Kingdom: Animalia
- Phylum: Mollusca
- Class: Gastropoda
- Order: Nudibranchia
- Family: Discodorididae
- Genus: Asteronotus
- Species: A. cespitosus

Binomial name
- Asteronotus cespitosus van Hasselt, 1824

Synonyms
- Actinodoris mauritiana Quoy, H.E.T. & J.P. Gaimard, 1832; Asteronotus bertrana Bergh, L.S.R., 1878; Asteronotus brassica Allan, J.K., 1932; Asteronotus fuscus O'Donoghue, C.H., 1924; Asteronotus hemprichi Ehrenberg, 1831; Asteronotus madrasensis O'Donoghue, C.H., 1932; Asteronotus wardianus Allan, J.K. 1932; Doris cerebralis Gould, A.A., 1852; Doris crescentica Collingwood, C., 1881; Doris exanthemata Kelaart, E.F., 1858; Doris foetida Pease, W.H., 1860; Doris mabilla "Bergh, L.S.R." Abraham, P.S., 1877; Doris vesiculosa Ehrenberg, C.G. MS; Jorunna marchadi Risbec, 1956

= Asteronotus cespitosus =

Species of gastropod

Asteronotus cespitosus is a species of sea slug or dorid nudibranch, a marine gastropod mollusk in the family Discodorididae.

== Distribution ==
This is a widespread Indo-West Pacific marine species which occurs in the Red Sea and from the Indian Ocean coasts of Tanzania, Madagascar, Seychelles and Mauritius to Indonesia, the Philippines, New Guinea, Australia and out into the Pacific Ocean as far as Hawaii and Japan.

== Description ==
The body of this nudibranch grows to a length of 250 mm. It is distinctive, with ridges of large tubercles running down centre of body, and a series of tubercles running parallel to the margin. The body is firm leathery. Its colour varies from blackish grey to brown, with paler tubercles and patches of white. This provides the species with camouflage well suited to its preferred habitat. The egg ribbon, in contrast, is pink.

== Ecology ==
Asteronotus cespitosus feeds on sponges.
