= Thorybopus =

Scientific classification
- Kingdom: Animalia
- Phylum: Mollusca
- Class: Gastropoda
- Order: Nudibranchia
- Family: Discodorididae
- Genus: Thorybopus; Bouchet, 1977

Genus of gastropods

Thorybopus is a genus of sea slugs, specifically dorid nudibranchs. They are marine gastropod molluscs in the family Discodorididae.

== Species ==
Species so far described in this genus include:

- Thorybopus lophatus Bouchet, 1977
