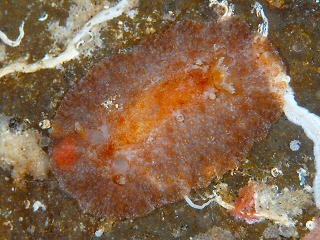

Scientific classification
- Kingdom: Animalia
- Phylum: Mollusca
- Class: Gastropoda
- Order: Nudibranchia
- Family: Discodorididae
- Genus: Carminodoris
- Species: C. bifurcata

Binomial name
- Carminodoris bifurcata Baba, 1993

Synonyms
- Hoplodoris bifurcata (Baba, 1993)

= Carminodoris bifurcata =

Species of gastropod

Carminodoris bifurcata is a species of sea slug, a dorid nudibranch, a marine gastropod mollusc in the family Discodorididae.

== Distribution ==
This species is recorded from Japan and Hawaii.
