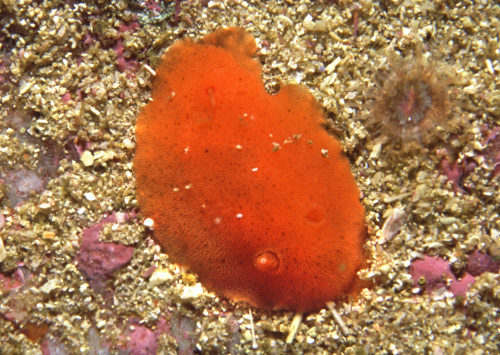

Scientific classification
- Kingdom: Animalia
- Phylum: Mollusca
- Class: Gastropoda
- Order: Nudibranchia
- Family: Discodorididae
- Genus: Rostanga
- Species: R. elandsia

Binomial name
- Rostanga elandsia Garovoy, Valdes & Gosliner, 2001

= Rostanga elandsia =

Species of gastropod

Rostanga elandsia, is a species of dorid nudibranch. It is a marine gastropod mollusc in the family Discodorididae.

== Distribution ==
This species has so far only been found around the southern African coast from the Atlantic side of the Cape Peninsula to the eastern side of False Bay. It has been found from the mid-intertidal zone to at least 30 m. It is endemic to South Africa.

== Description ==
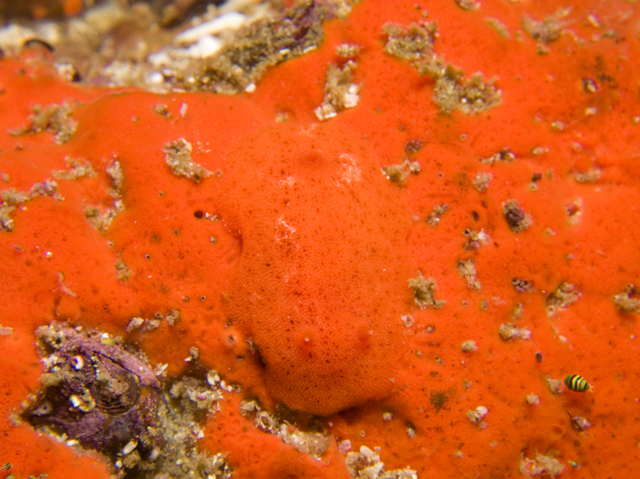
The red sponge nudibranch is extremely well camouflaged on its food source, a red sponge

The red sponge nudibranch is a yellow-orange to red dorid with scattered small black spots on its notum. It is extremely well camouflaged on its prey sponges. Its gills are arranged around the anus and its rhinophores are perfoliate. It may reach a total length of 30 mm.

== Ecology ==
This species feeds on red and yellow-orange sponges which determine the animal's colour. The egg mass is a transparent spiral collar with large orange eggs visible within.
