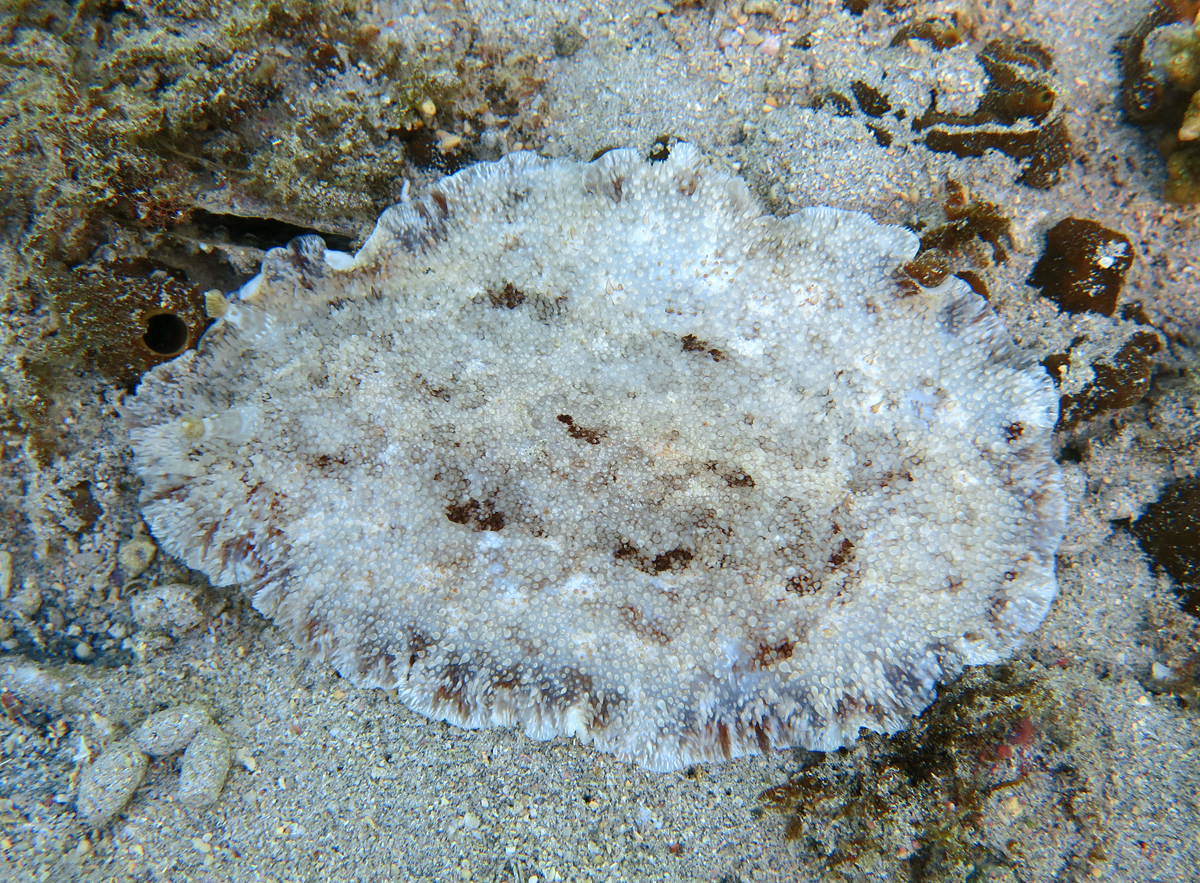

Scientific classification
- Kingdom: Animalia
- Phylum: Mollusca
- Class: Gastropoda
- Order: Nudibranchia
- Family: Discodorididae
- Genus: Sebadoris
- Species: S. nubilosa

Binomial name
- Sebadoris nubilosa (Pease, 1871)

Synonyms
- Archidoris nubilosa (Pease, 1871); Argus indicus O'Donoghue, 1932; Diaulula gigantea Bergh, 1905; Doris nubilosa Pease, 1871; Thordisa crosslandi Eliot, 1903

= Sebadoris nubilosa =

Species of gastropod

Sebadoris nubilosa is a species of sea slug, a dorid nudibranch, shell-less marine gastropod mollusc in the family Discodorididae.
