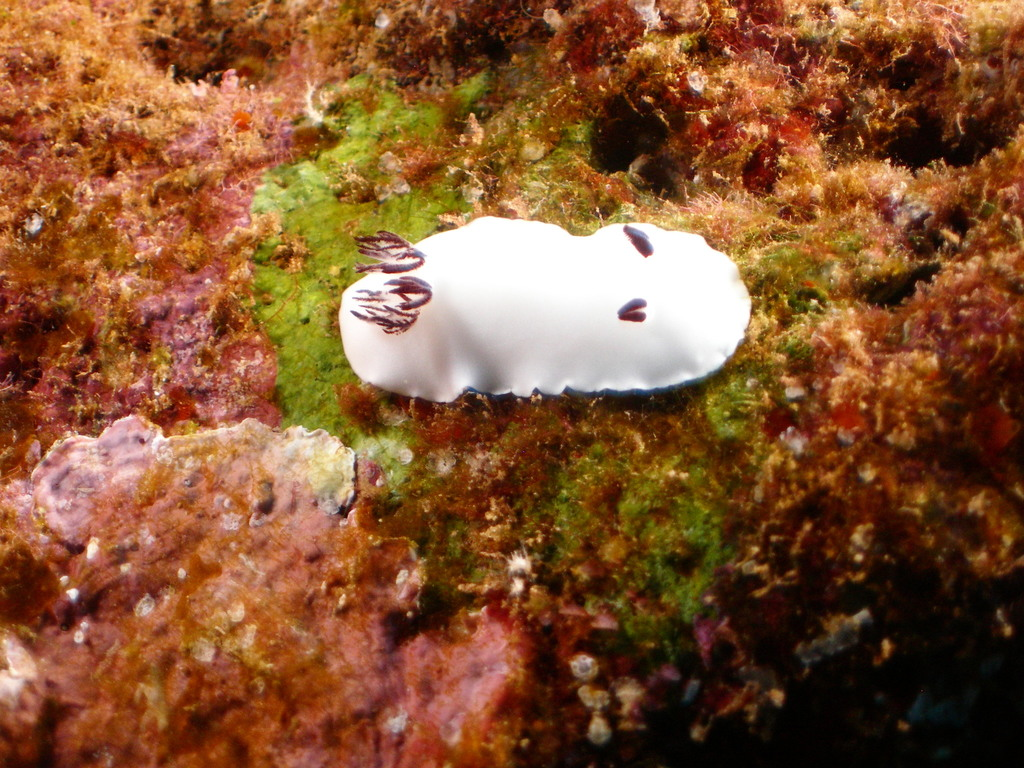

Scientific classification
- Kingdom: Animalia
- Phylum: Mollusca
- Class: Gastropoda
- Order: Nudibranchia
- Family: Discodorididae
- Genus: Hiatodoris; Dayrat, 2010
- Species: H. fellowsi

Binomial name
- Hiatodoris fellowsi (Kay & Young, 1969)

= Hiatodoris =

Genus of gastropods

Hiatodoris is a monotypic genus of sea slugs, specifically dorid nudibranchs. They are marine gastropod molluscs in the family Discodorididae. The only species is Hiatodoris fellowsi commonly known as the Snowball Sea Slug or Fellow's Nudibranch. It was previously known as Peltodoris fellowsi.

== Description & Anatomy ==
Hiatodoris fellowsi has an oval-like firm and white body, black rhinophores and gills, and white egg masses. It is a small species with a maximum size of about 51 mm. As most nudibranchs, this species is a hermaphrodite. The ejaculatory and vaginal ducts have their own orifices. It has a straight ejaculatory duct with a tight and convoluted vas deferens. Its prostate gland has no prostatic duct, but is large and finely lobulate. The spermatocyst and spermatheca are arranged semiserically, where the spermatheca is a little bigger than the spermatocyst and both are ovate. Hiatodoris fellowsi has a long vaginal duct with a loose and convolute opening into the spermatocyst. Its uterine duct is passes from the spermatocyst to a junction where the ampullary duct, prostate, and mucous gland are. Hiatodoris fellowsi also has a radula that is simply hamate, and measures between 75 and 450μm long. The teeth curve at a wide angle resembling a makau with a small outer flange.

== Distribution and habitat ==
Hiatodoris fellowsi can be found throughout the Pacific Ocean including the Hawaiian Islands, Henderson Island, Hachijo Island, Lifou. It can be found under shaded cliffs and ledges at depths between 3 and 24 meters, feeding on sponges.

== Links to Photos ==
- https://seaslugsofhawaii.com/species/Hiatodoris-fellowsi-e.html
- https://www.marinelifephotography.com/marine/mollusks/slugs/peltodoris-fellowsi.htm
