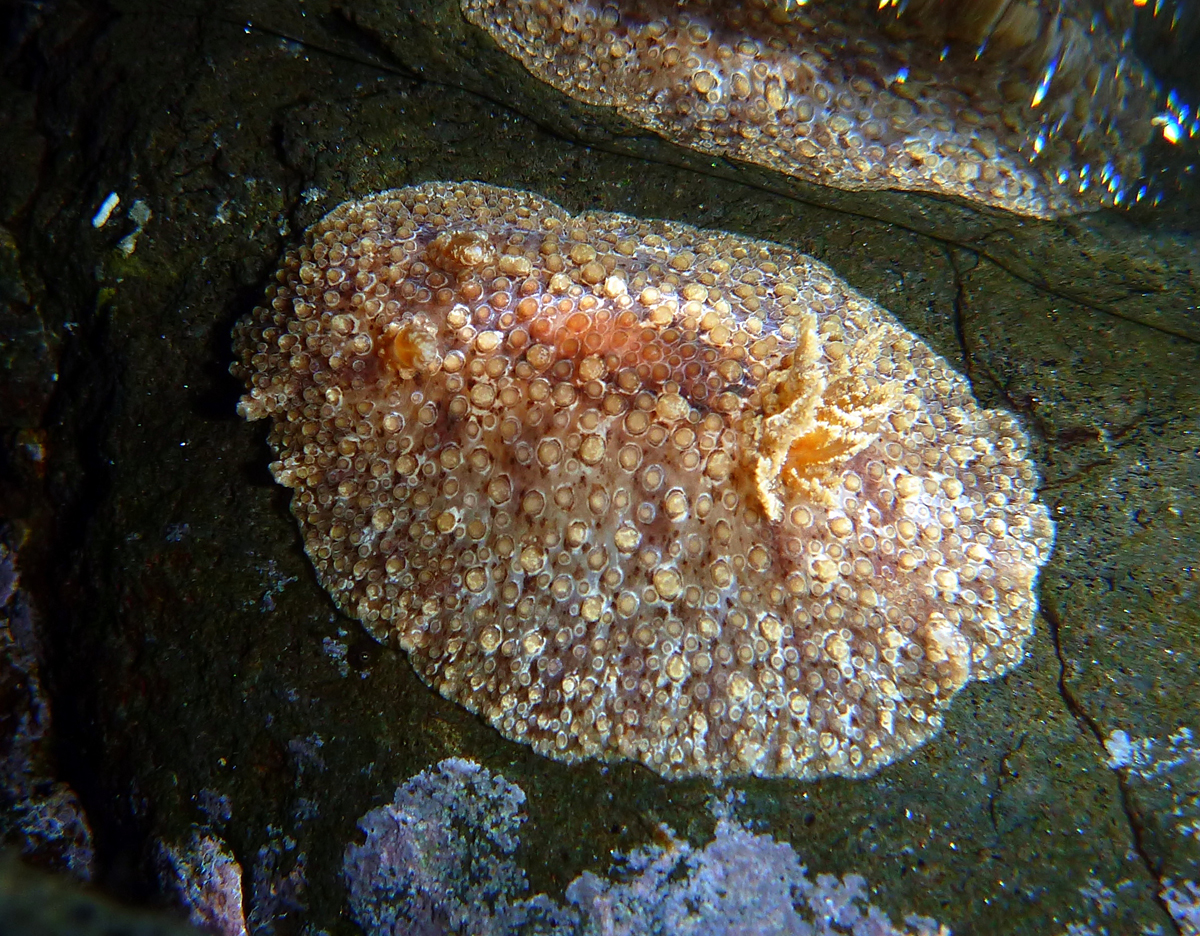

Scientific classification
- Kingdom: Animalia
- Phylum: Mollusca
- Class: Gastropoda
- Order: Nudibranchia
- Family: Discodorididae
- Genus: Carminodoris
- Species: C. grandiflora

Binomial name
- Carminodoris grandiflora (Pease, 1860)

Synonyms
- List: Carminodoris mauritiana Bergh, 1889; Doris grandiflora Pease, 1860; Doris grandifloriger Abraham, 1877; Hoplodoris desmoparypha Bergh, 1880; Hoplodoris grandiflora (Pease, 1860)

= Carminodoris grandiflora =

Species of gastropod

Carminodoris grandiflora is a species of sea slug, a dorid nudibranch, a marine gastropod mollusc in the family Discodorididae.

== Distribution ==
This species is recorded from the Indo-West Pacific including Hawaii, the Philippines, Palau, Kerama Island, Mauritius, Tanzania and Madagascar.
