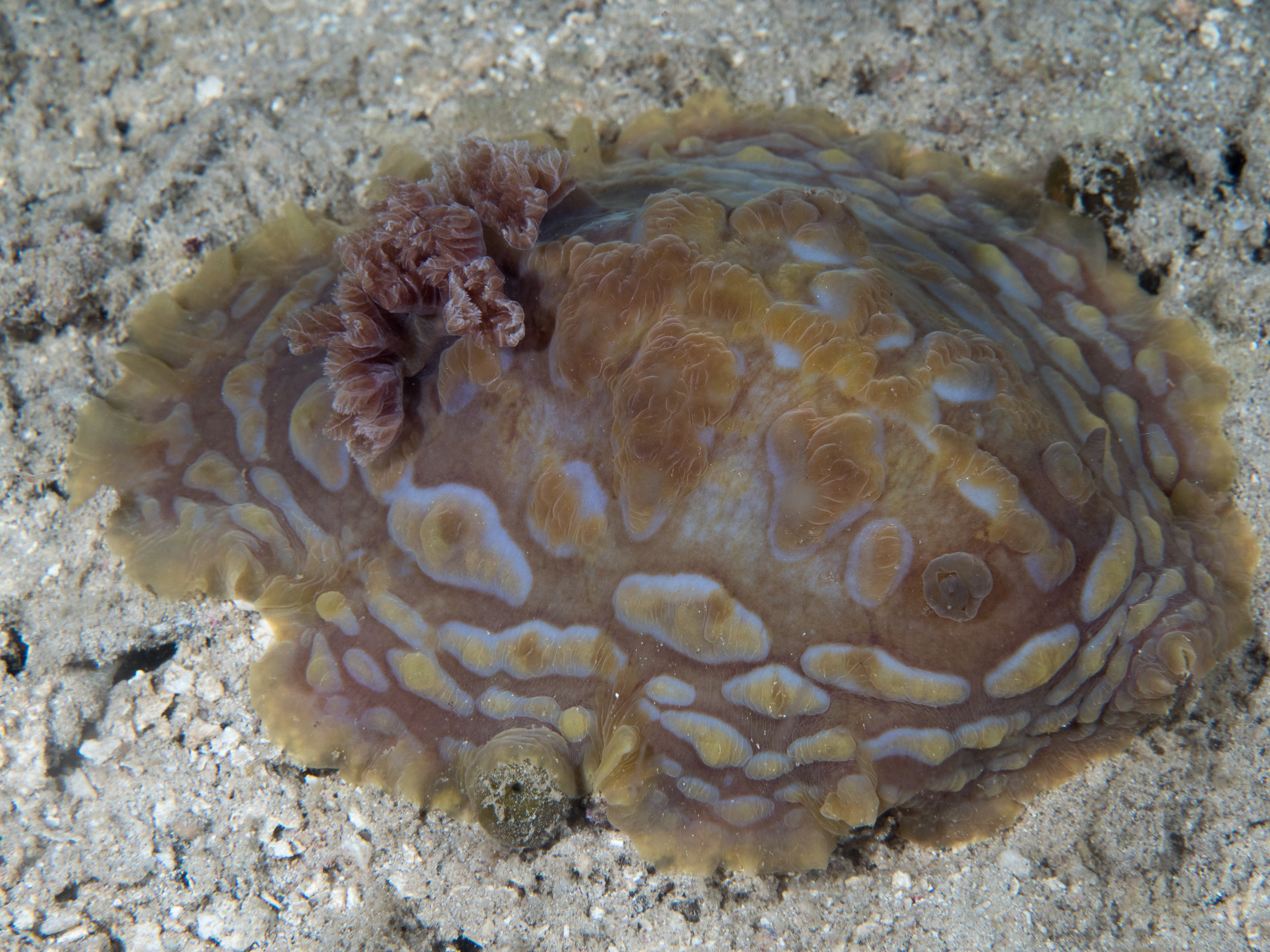
- An Asteronotus cespitosus

Scientific classification
- Kingdom: Animalia
- Phylum: Mollusca
- Class: Gastropoda
- Order: Nudibranchia
- Family: Discodorididae
- Genus: Asteronotus; Ehrenberg, 1831

= Asteronotus =

Genus of gastropods

Asteronotus is a genus of sea slugs, dorid nudibranchs, shell-less marine gastropod molluscs in the family Discodorididae.

== Species ==
Species in the genus Asteronotus include:

- Asteronotus cespitosus van Hasselt, 1824
- Asteronotus hepaticus (Abraham, 1877)
- Asteronotus mabilla (Abraham, 1877)
- Asteronotus mimeticus Gosliner & Valdes, 2002
- Asteronotus raripilosus (Abraham, 1877)
- Asteronotus spongicolus Gosliner & Valdes, 2002

Species brought into synonymy

- Asteronotus bertrana Bergh, L.S.R., 1878: synonym of Asteronotus cespitosus van Hasselt, 1824
- Asteronotus brassica Allan, J.K., 1932: synonym of Asteronotus cespitosus van Hasselt, 1824
- Asteronotus fuscus O'Donoghue, C.H., 1924: synonym of Asteronotus cespitosus van Hasselt, 1824
- Asteronotus hemprichi Ehrenberg, 1831: synonym of Asteronotus cespitosus van Hasselt, 1824
- Asteronotus madrasensis O'Donoghue, C.H., 1932: synonym of Asteronotus cespitosus van Hasselt, 1824
- Asteronotus mabilla Bergh, L.S.R., 1878: synonym of Asteronotus cespitosus van Hasselt, 1824
- Asteronotus trenberthi Burn, 1962: synonym of Sclerodoris trenberthi (Burn, 1962)
