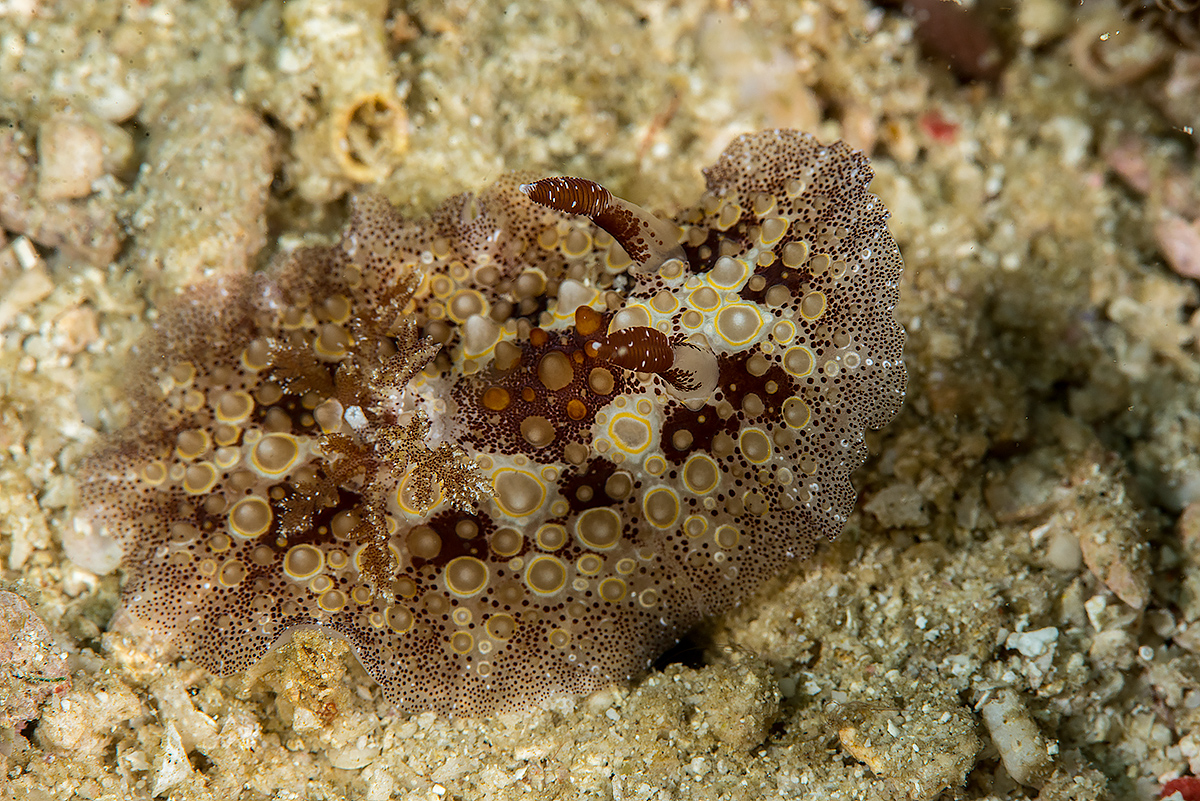
- Carminodoris estrelyado in Rinca, Indonesia.

Scientific classification
- Kingdom: Animalia
- Phylum: Mollusca
- Class: Gastropoda
- Order: Nudibranchia
- Family: Discodorididae
- Genus: Carminodoris
- Species: C. estrelyado

Binomial name
- Carminodoris estrelyado (Gosliner & Behrens, 1998)

Synonyms
- Hoplodoris estrelyado Gosliner & Behrens, 1998

= Carminodoris estrelyado =

Species of gastropod

Carminodoris estrelyado is a species of sea slug, a dorid nudibranch, a marine gastropod mollusc in the family Discodorididae.

== Distribution ==
This species is recorded from the Indo-West Pacific including Western Australia, Vietnam, Philippines, Indonesia and the Marshall Islands.
