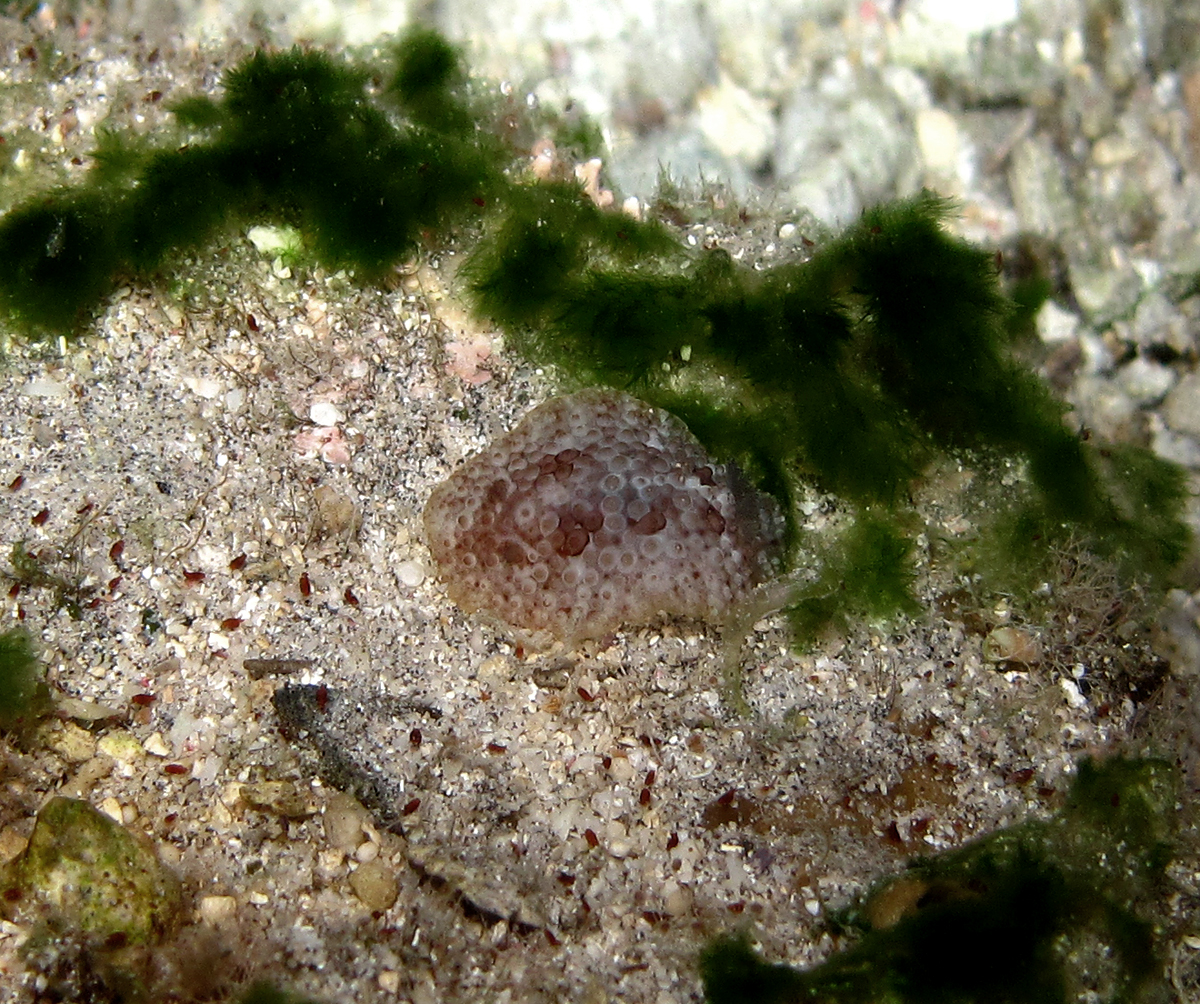
- Carminodoris grandiflora (a species within the genus)

Scientific classification
- Kingdom: Animalia
- Phylum: Mollusca
- Class: Gastropoda
- Order: Nudibranchia
- Family: Discodorididae
- Genus: Carminodoris; Bergh, 1889

Type species
- Carminodoris mauritiana Bergh, 1889

= Carminodoris =

Genus of gastropods

Carminodoris is a genus of sea slugs, dorid nudibranchs, shell-less marine gastropod mollusks in the family Discodorididae.

The genus Carminodoris was originally classified by Bergh in 1891 in the subfamily Platydorididae (despite the use of the suffix -idea), a subfamily of the family Dorididae. In 1934 Alice Pruvot-Fol elevated this subfamily to its new status as the family Latydorididae. In 2002 Valdés gave the name Discodorididae precedence over the name Platydorididae.

The Sea Slug Forum however classifies this genus in the family Dorididae.

== Species ==
Species in the genus Carminodoris include:

- Carminodoris boucheti Ortea, 1979
- Carminodoris cockerelli Risbec, 1930
- Carminodoris mauritiana Bergh, 1889
- Carminodoris punctulifera (Bergh, 1907)
- Carminodoris spinobranchialis Ortea & Martínez, 1992

Synonyms:

- Carminodoris armata Baba, 1993 is a synonym of Hoplodoris armata.
- Carminodoris bifurcata Baba, 1993: synonym of Hoplodoris bifurcata Baba, 1993
- Carminodoris estrelyado (Gosliner & Behrens, 1998): synonym of Hoplodoris estrelyado Gosliner & Behrens, 1998
- Carminodoris flammea (Fahey & Gosliner, 2003): synonym of Hoplodoris flammea Fahey & Gosliner, 2003
- Carminodoris grandiflora (Pease, 1860): synonym of Hoplodoris grandiflora (Pease, 1860)
- Carminodoris mauritiana Bergh, 1880: synonym of Hoplodoris grandiflora (Pease, 1860).
- Carminodoris nodulosa (Angas, 1864):synonym of Hoplodoris bifurcata (Baba, 1993).
