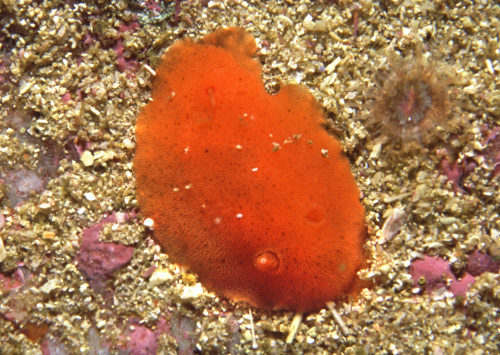
- Rostanga elandsia

Scientific classification
- Kingdom: Animalia
- Phylum: Mollusca
- Class: Gastropoda
- Order: Nudibranchia
- Superfamily: Doridoidea
- Family: Discodorididae; Bergh, 1891

Type genus
- Discodoris

Genera
- See text

Synonyms
- Diaululinae Bergh, 1891; Geitodorididae Odhner, 1968; Gruveliinae Thiele, 1931; Halgerdinae Odhner, 1926; Kentrodoridinae Bergh, 1891; Platydoridinae Bergh, 1891; Rostangidae Pruvot-Fol, 1951

= Discodorididae =

Family of gastropods

Discodorididae is a taxonomic family of sea slugs, specifically dorid nudibranchs, marine gastropod mollusks in the superfamily Doridoidea.

Species in this family belong to the cryptobranch dorid nudibranchs, i.e. they are able to retract their gills into a gill pocket (cryptobranch = hidden gills). Most are small and hard to identify. Most are thought to feed at night on sponges, while during the day they search for dark areas or remain hidden under rocks.

One example of a discodoridid is the "Pacific sea lemon" or "speckled sea lemon", Peltodoris nobilis, which occurs off the coast of British Columbia to Baja California from low-tide waters to a depth of about 200 m. Not only is this species yellow with a bumpy surface, but it also gives off a strong fruity citrus smell when handled, adding to its resemblance to a lemon.

== Genera ==
Genera within the family Discodorididae include:

- Alloiodoris Bergh, 1904
- Aporodoris Ihering, 1886
- Asteronotus Ehrenberg, 1831
- Atagema Gray, 1850
- Baptodoris Bergh, 1884
- Carminodoris Bergh, 1889
- Diaulula Bergh, 1878
- Dictyodoris Bergh, 1880
- Discodoris Bergh, 1877 - the type genus
- Gargamella Bergh, 1894
- Geitodoris Bergh, 1892
- Gravieria Vayssiere, 1912
- Halgerda Bergh, 1880
- Hiatodoris Dayrat, 2010
- Hoplodoris Bergh, 1880 - synonym: Carminodoris Bergh, 1889
- Jorunna Bergh, 1876
- Nirva Bergh, 1905
- Nophodoris Valdés & Gosliner, 2001
- Paradoris Ortea, 1995
- Peltodoris Bergh, 1880
- Platydoris Bergh, 1877
- Rostanga Bergh, 1879
- Sclerodoris Eliot, 1904
- Sebadoris Er. Marcus & Ev. Marcus, 1960
- Taringa Er. Marcus, 1955
- Tayuva Er. Marcus & Ev. Marcus, 1967
- Thordisa Bergh, 1877
- Thorybopus Bouchet, 1977
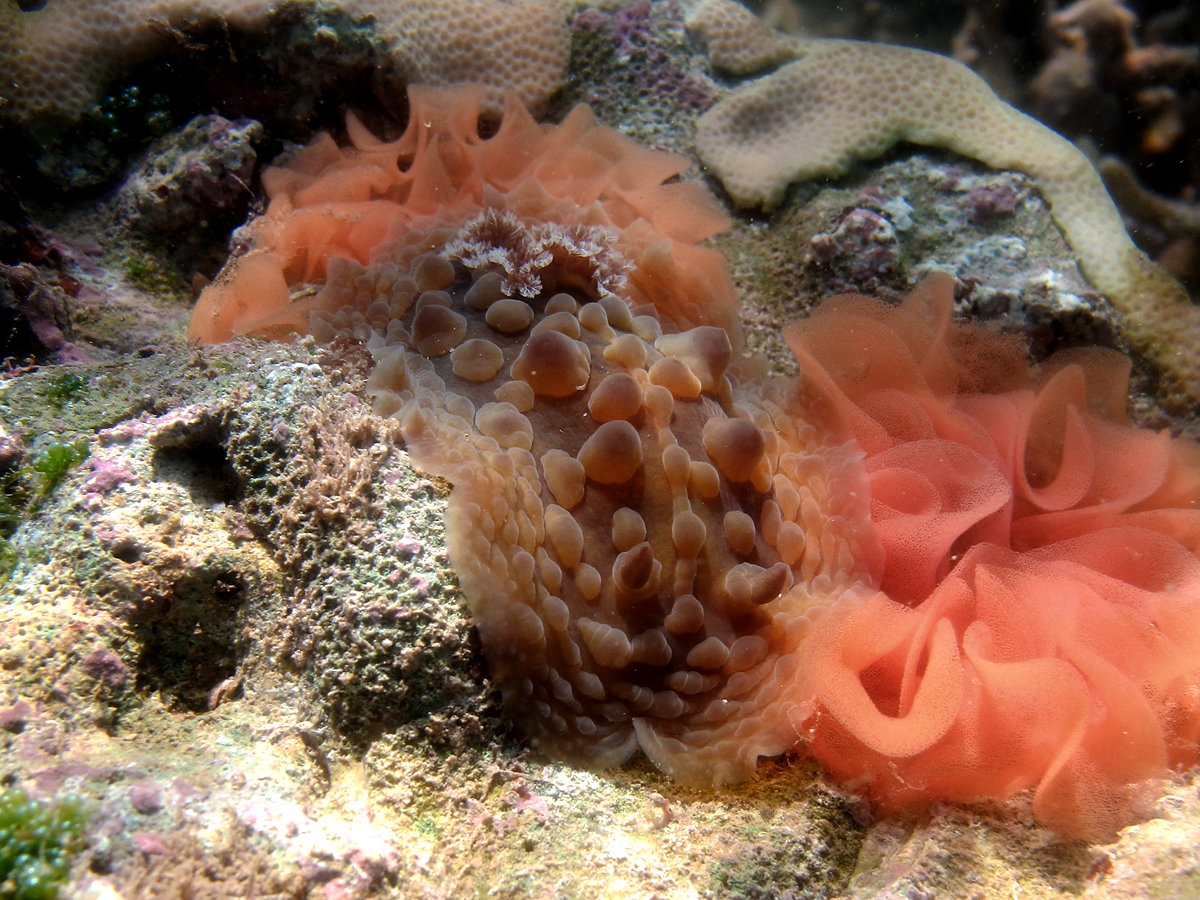
Asteronotus cespitosus

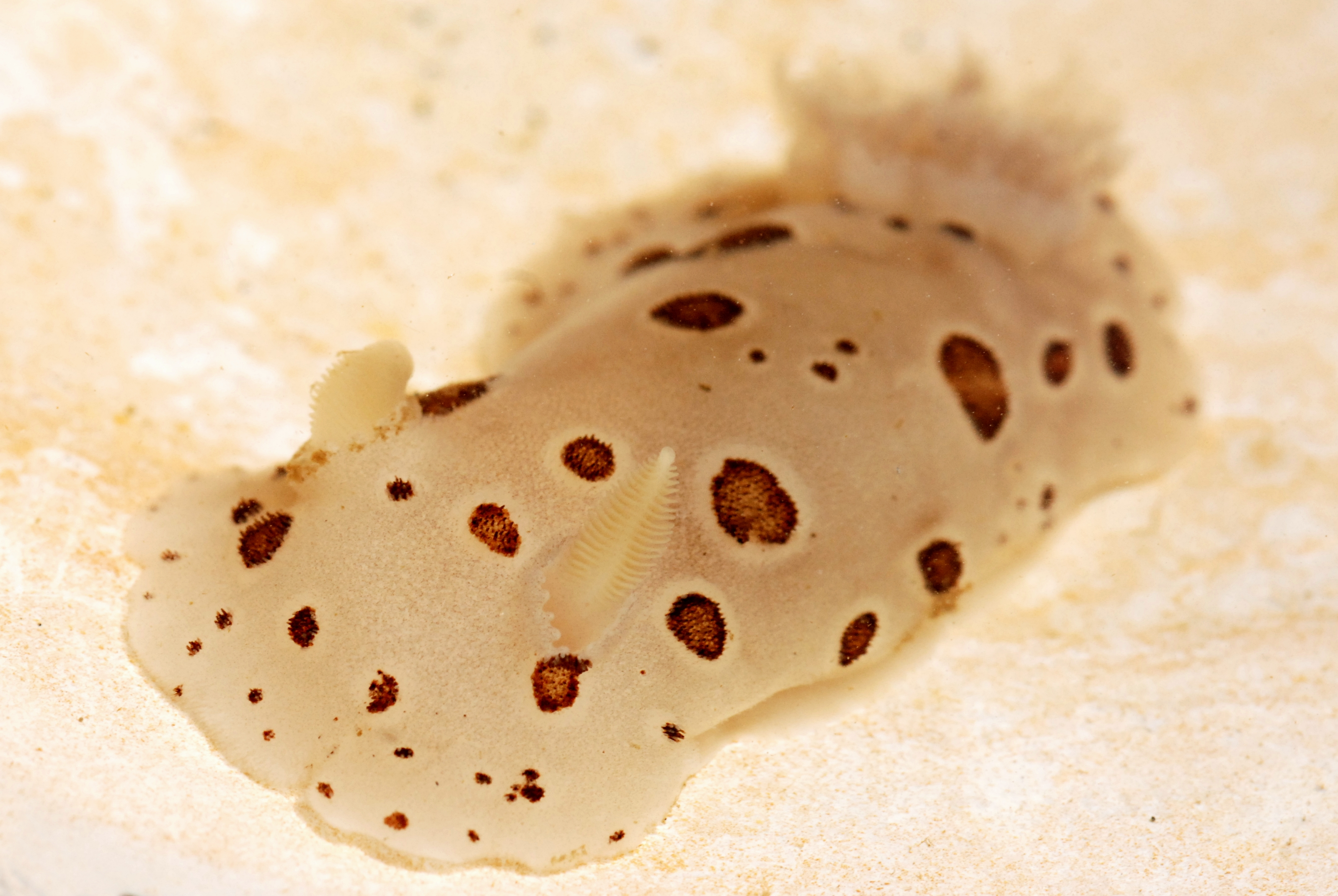
Diaulula sandiegensis

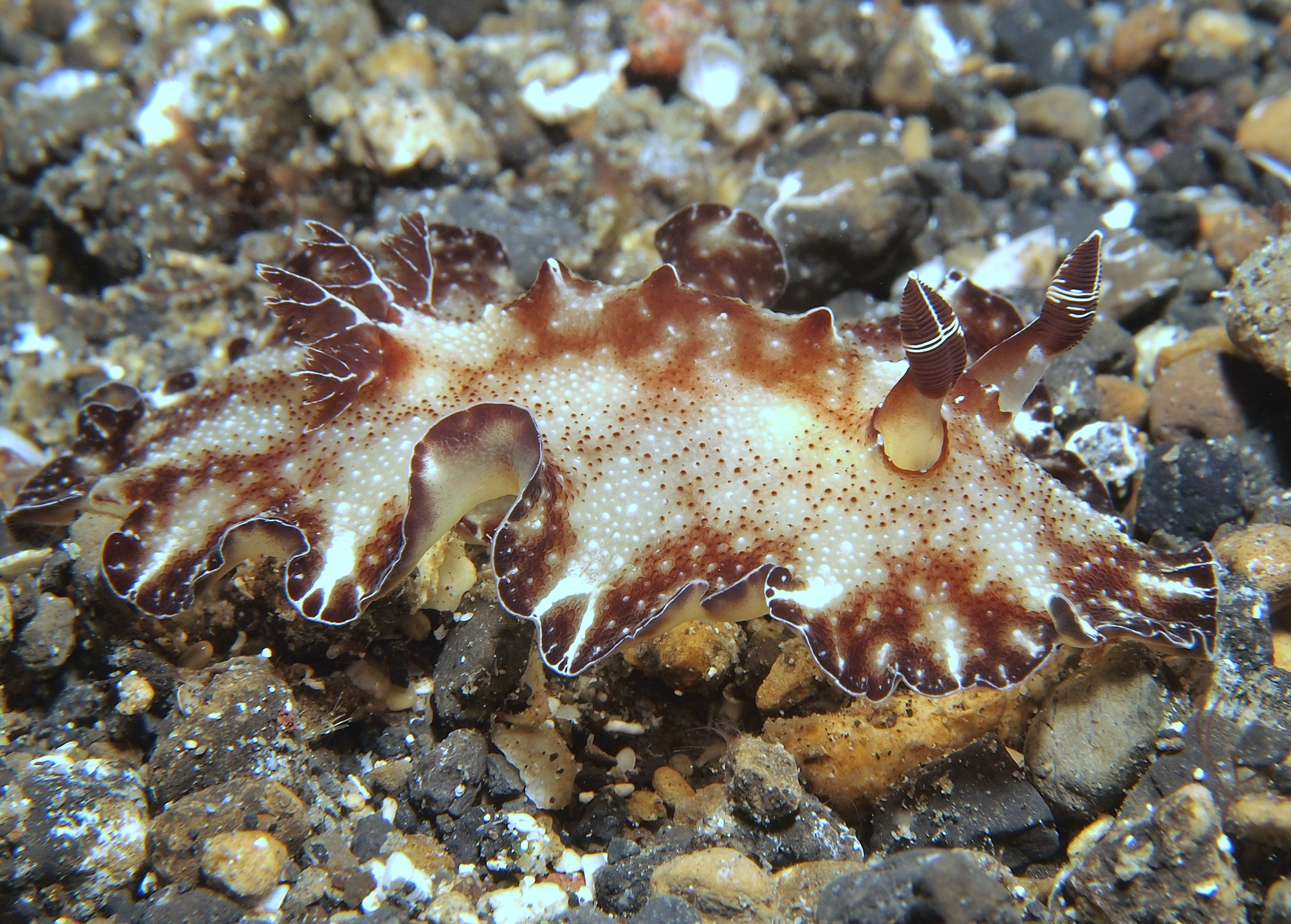
Discodoris boholiensis

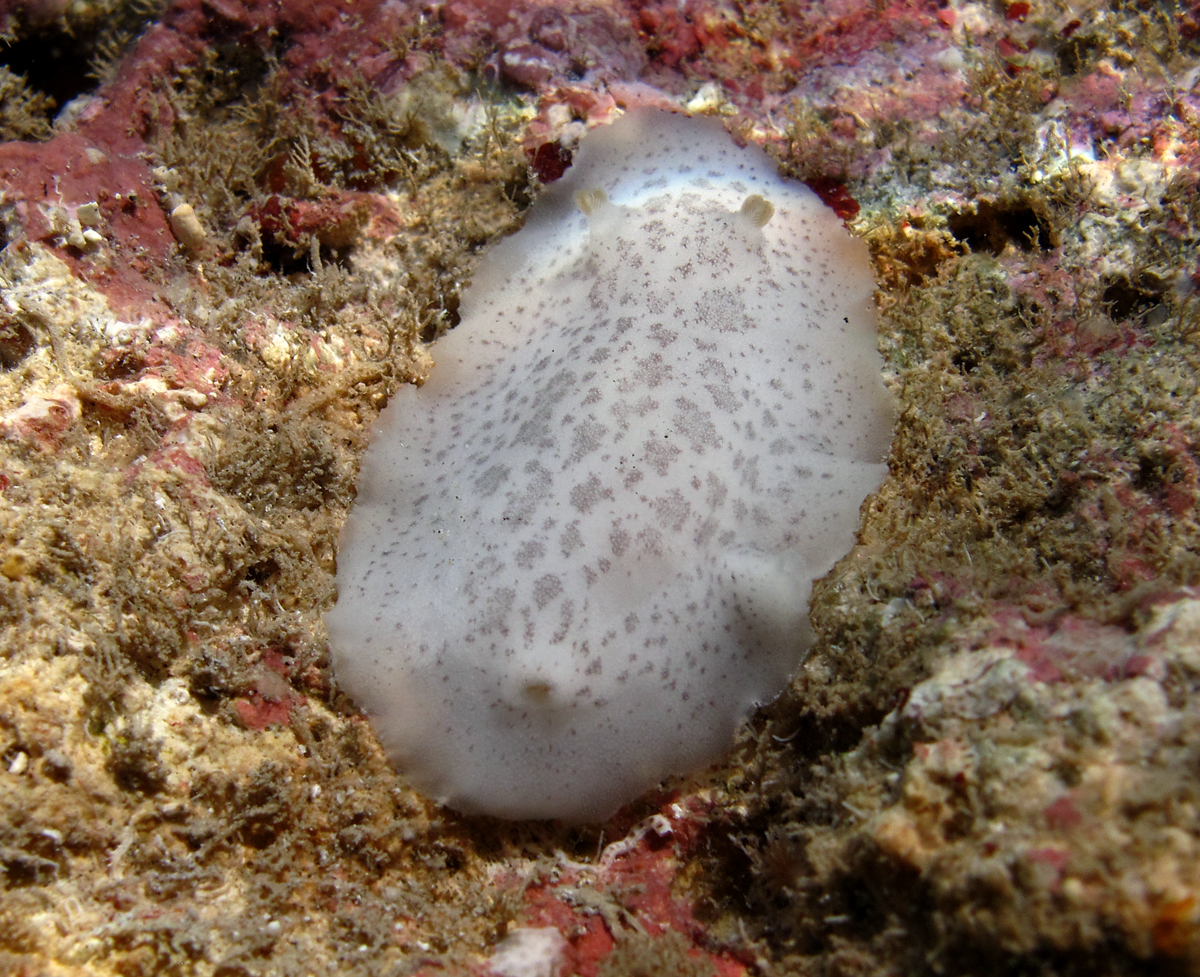
Discodoris coerulescens

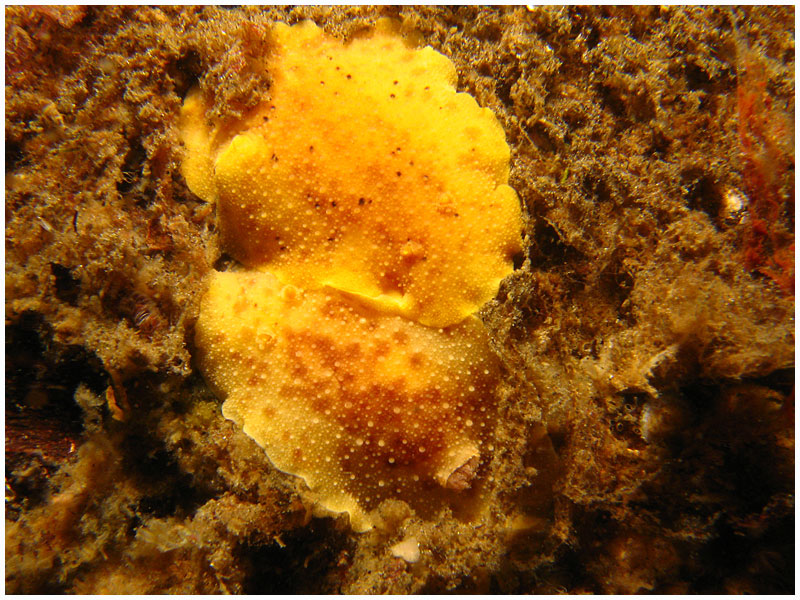
Geitodoris heathi

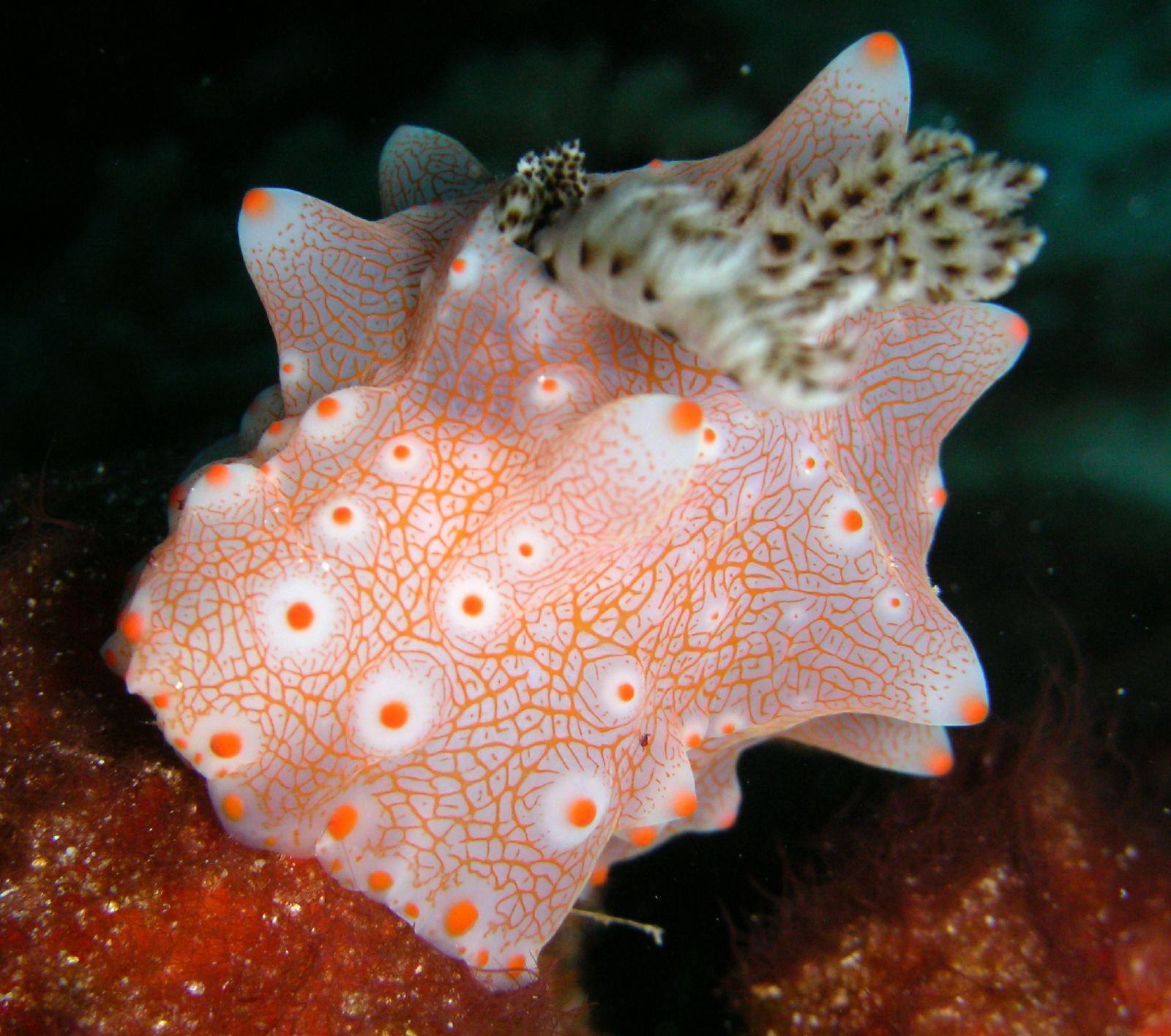
Halgerda batangas

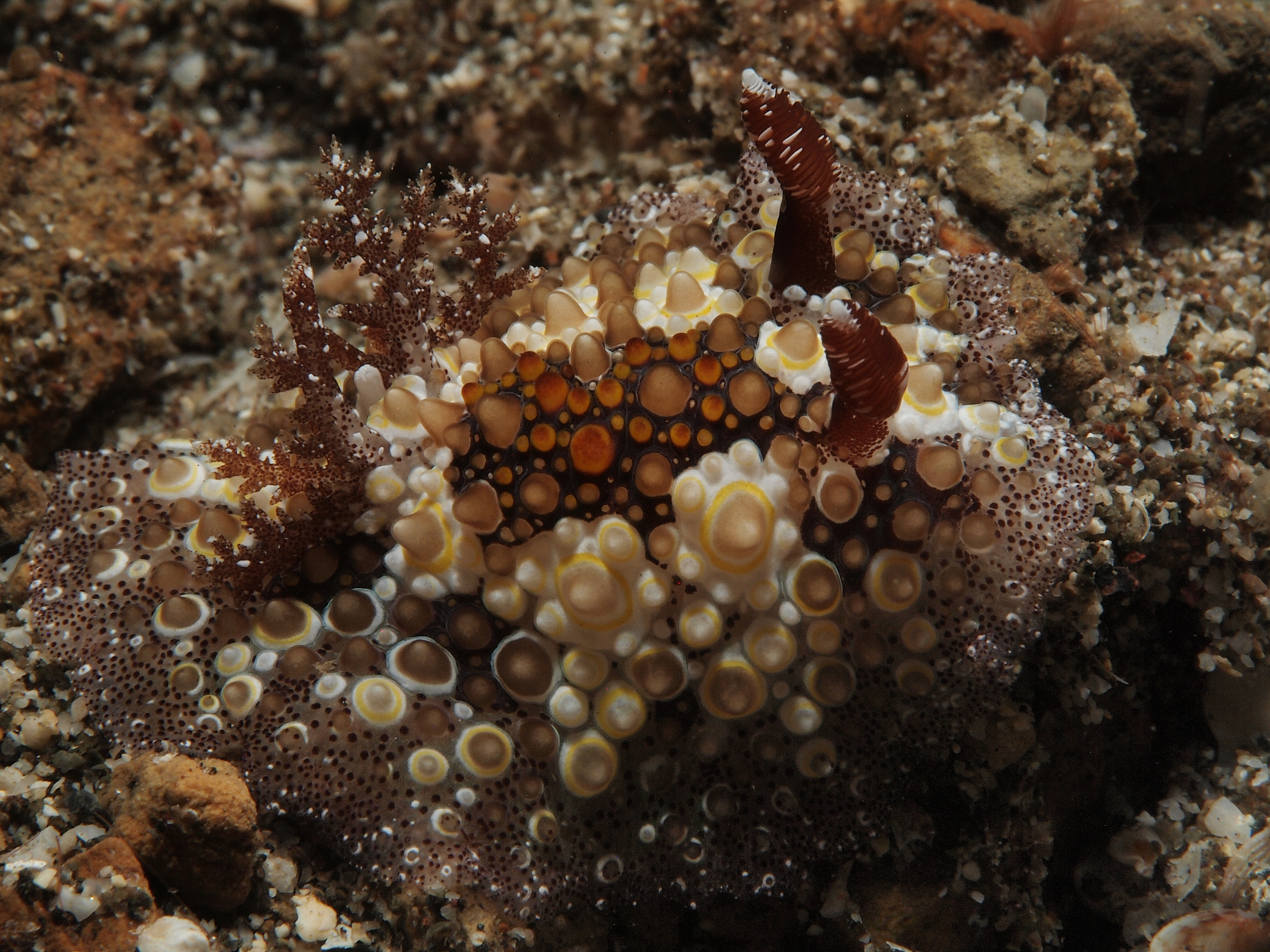
Hoplodoris estrelyado

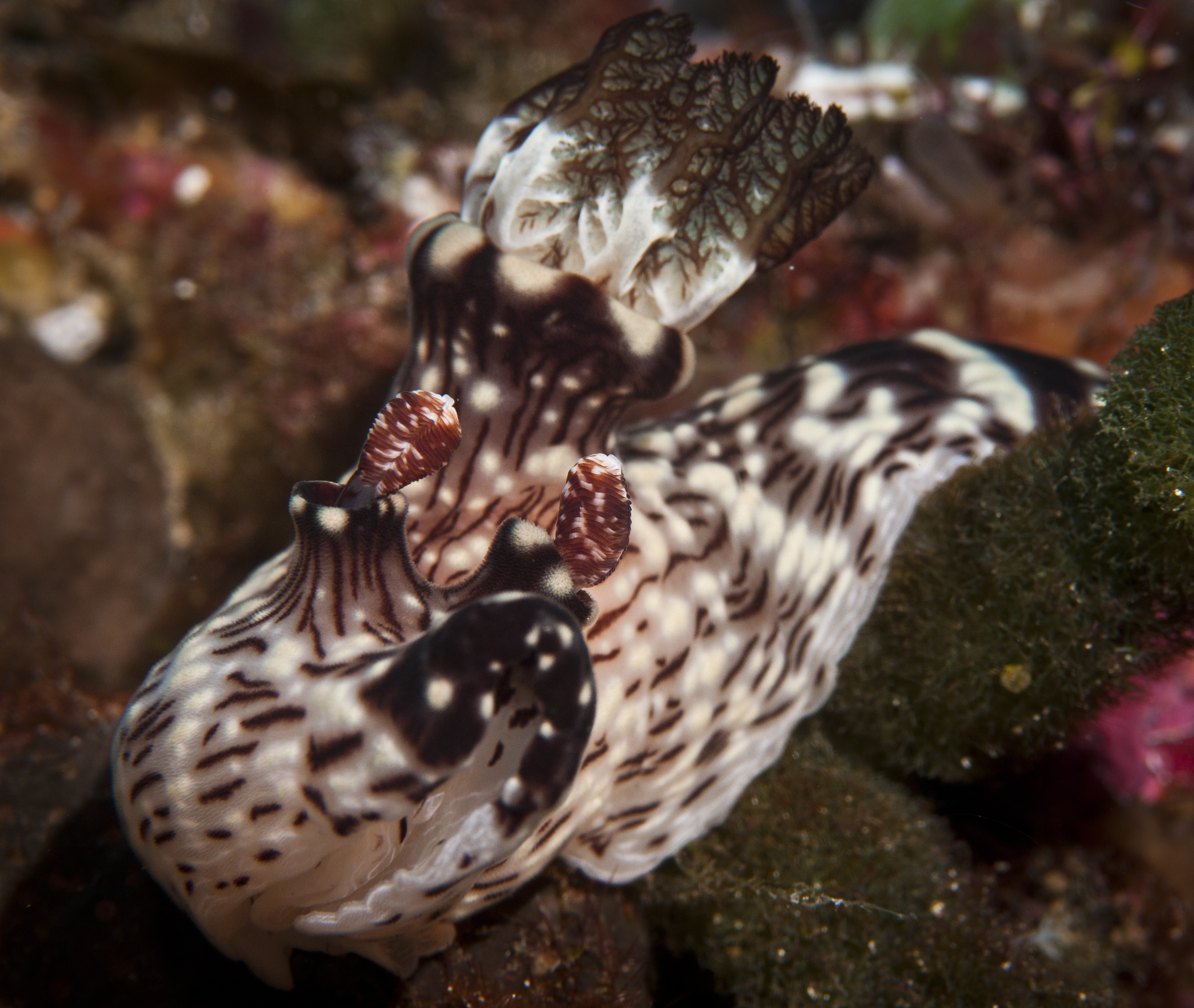
Jorunna rubescens

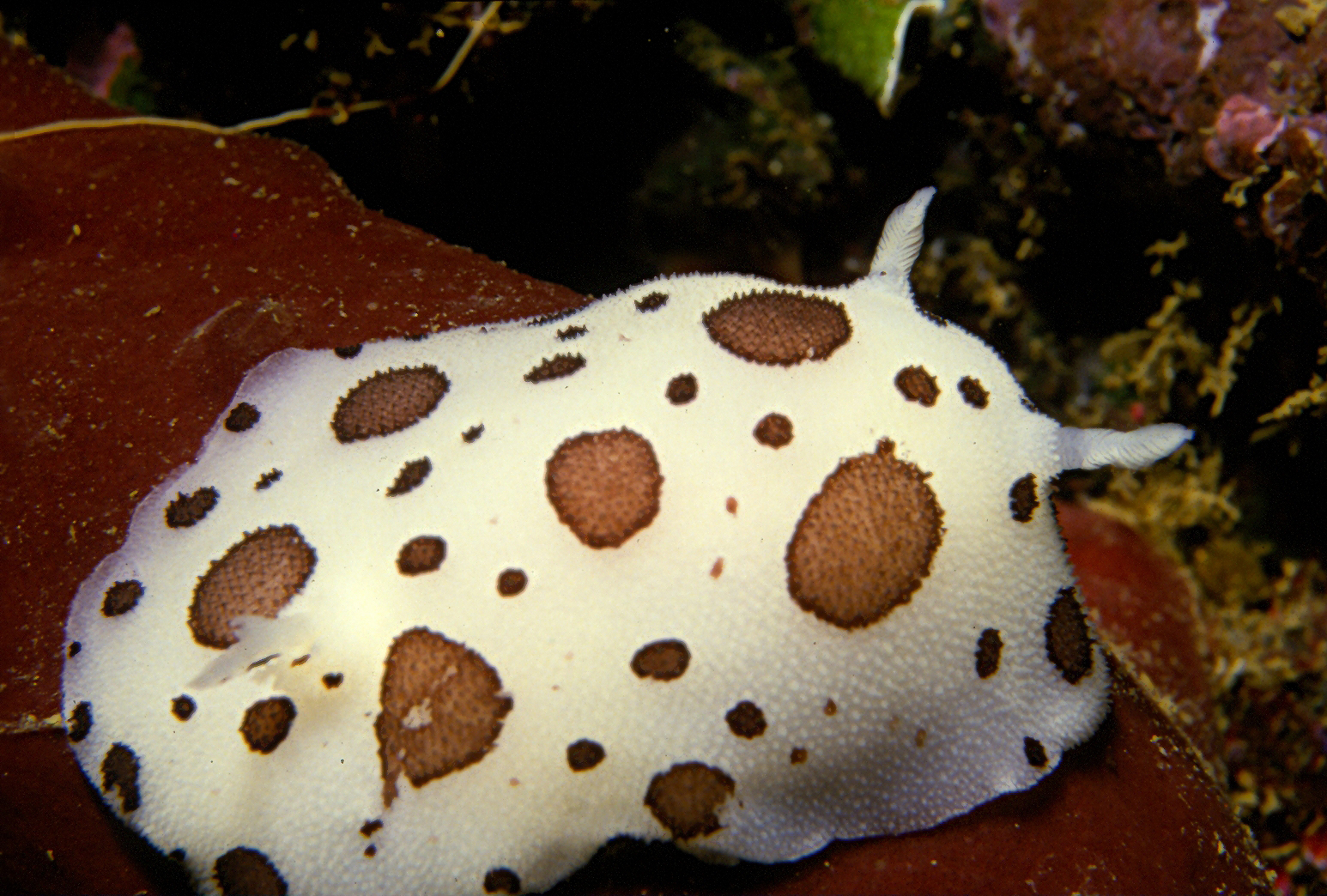
Peltodoris atromaculata

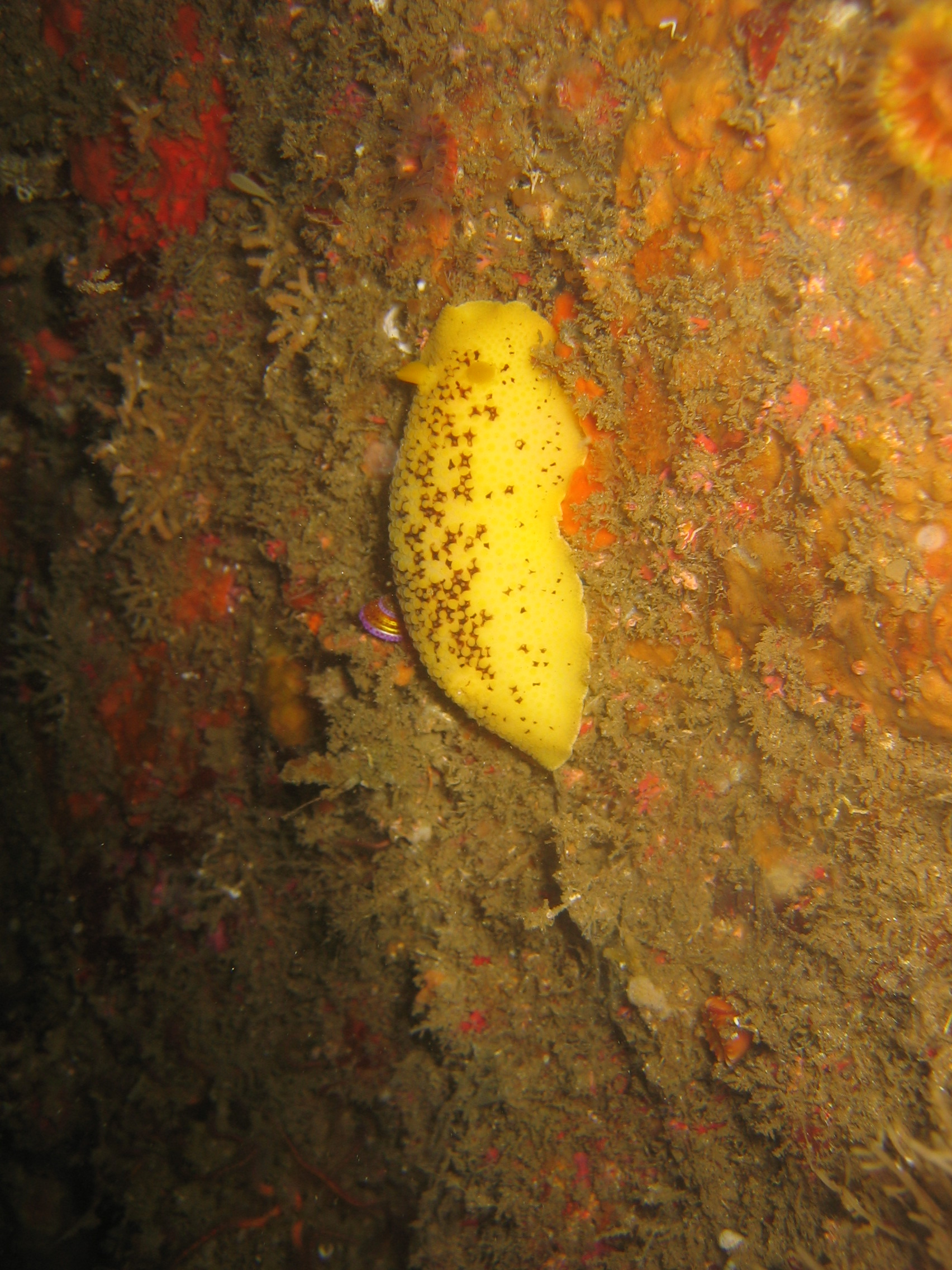
Peltodoris mullineri

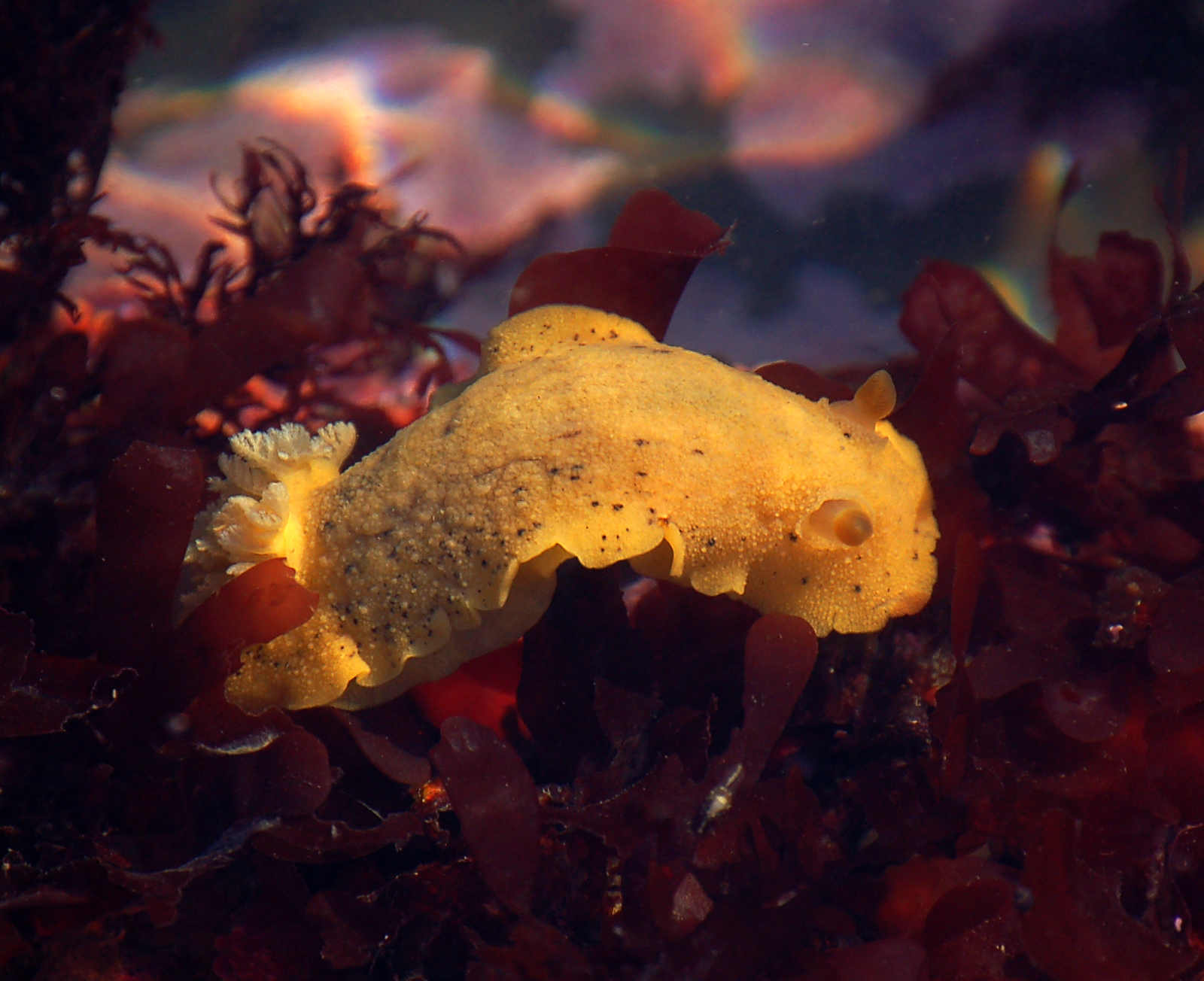
Peltodoris nobilis

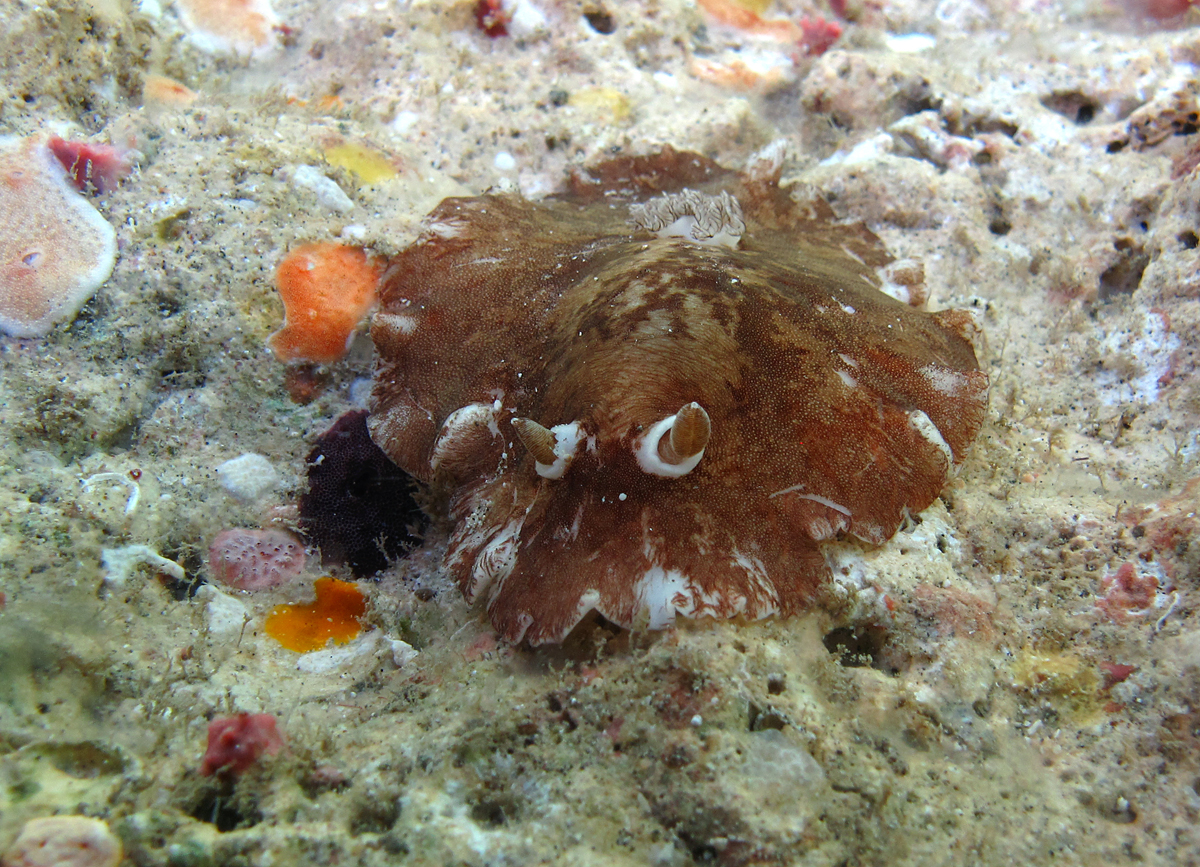
Platydoris cruenta

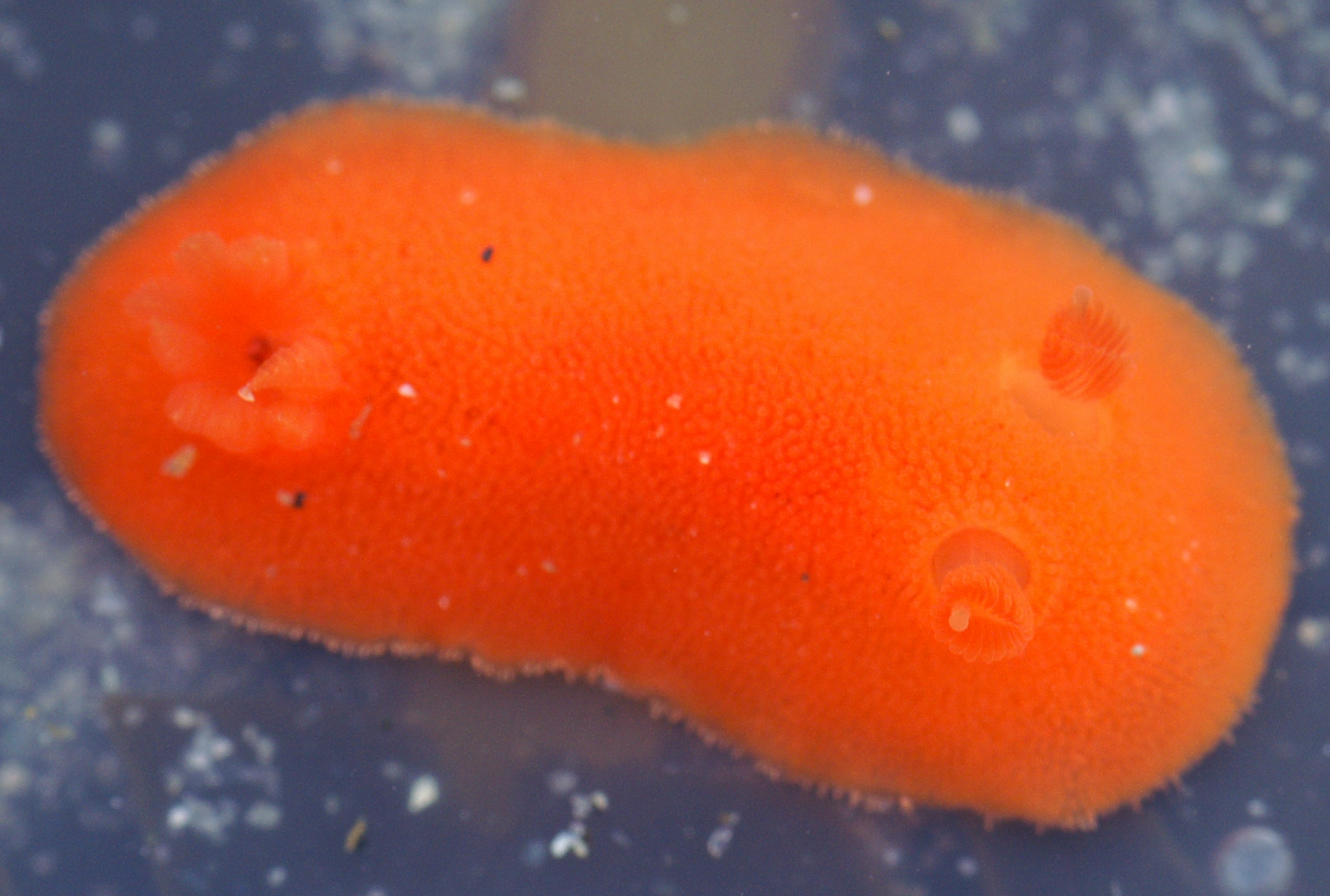
Rostanga pulchra

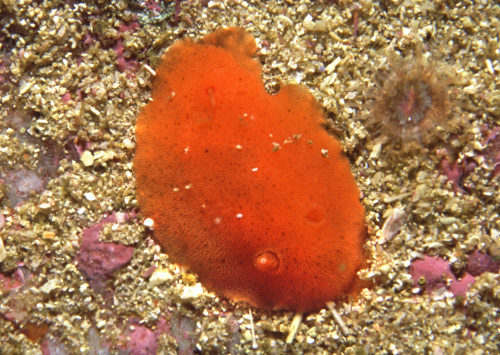
Rostanga elandsia

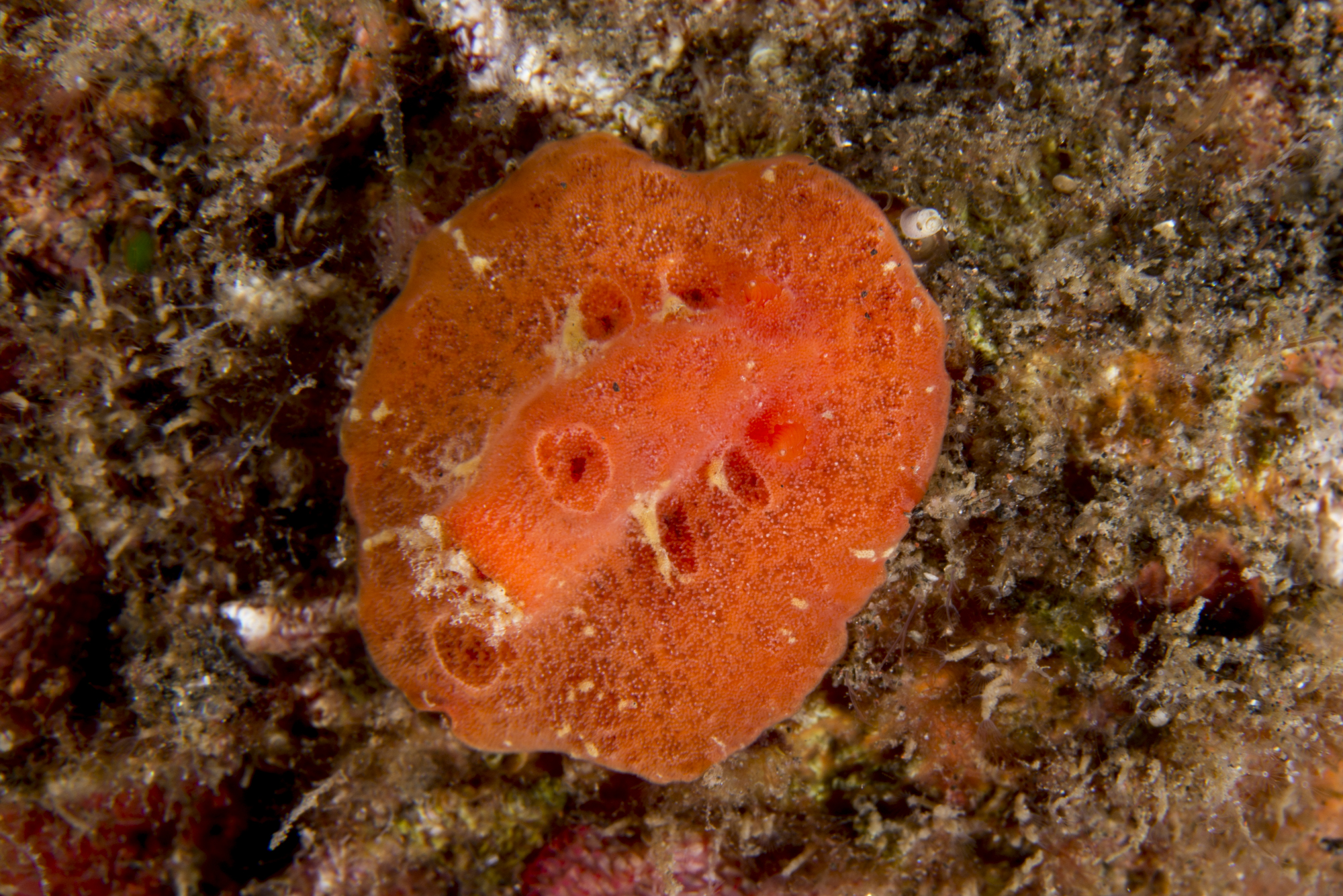
Sclerodoris tuberculata

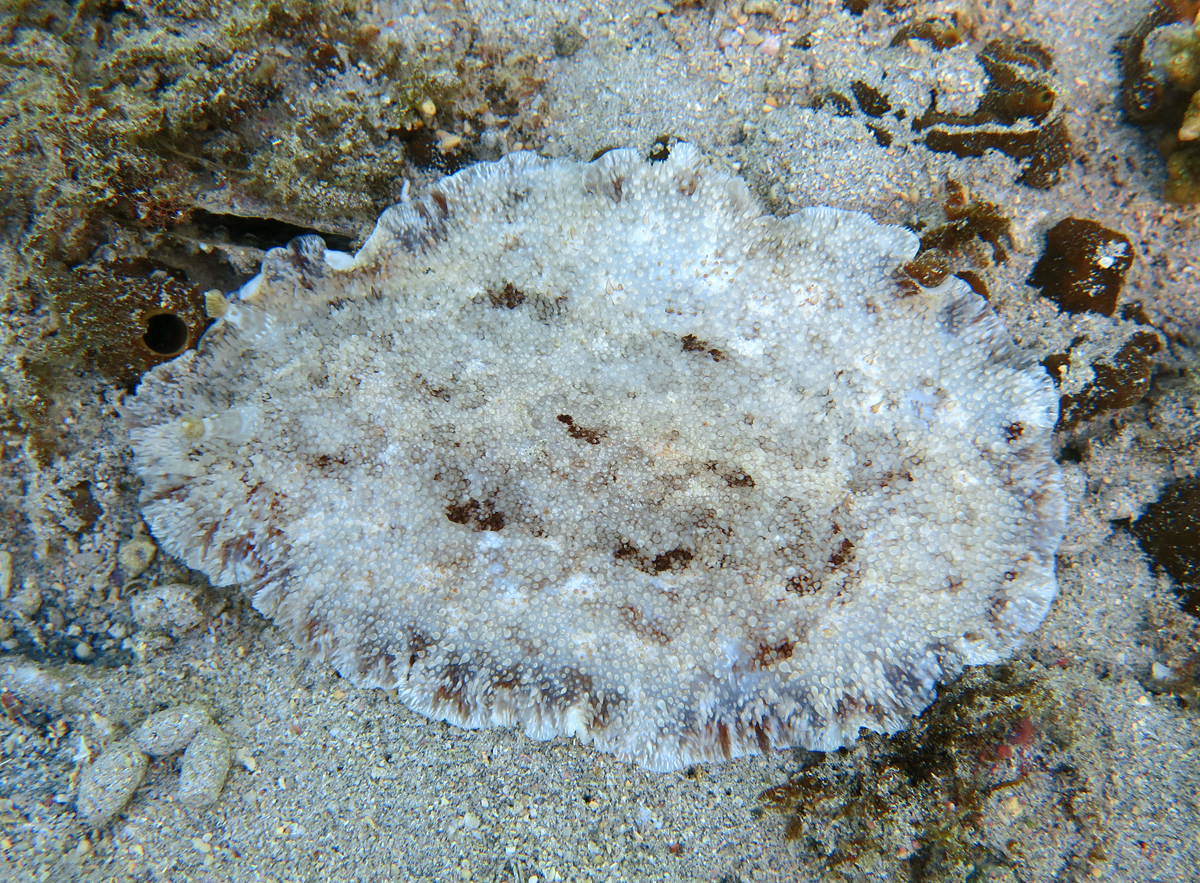
Sebadoris nubilosa

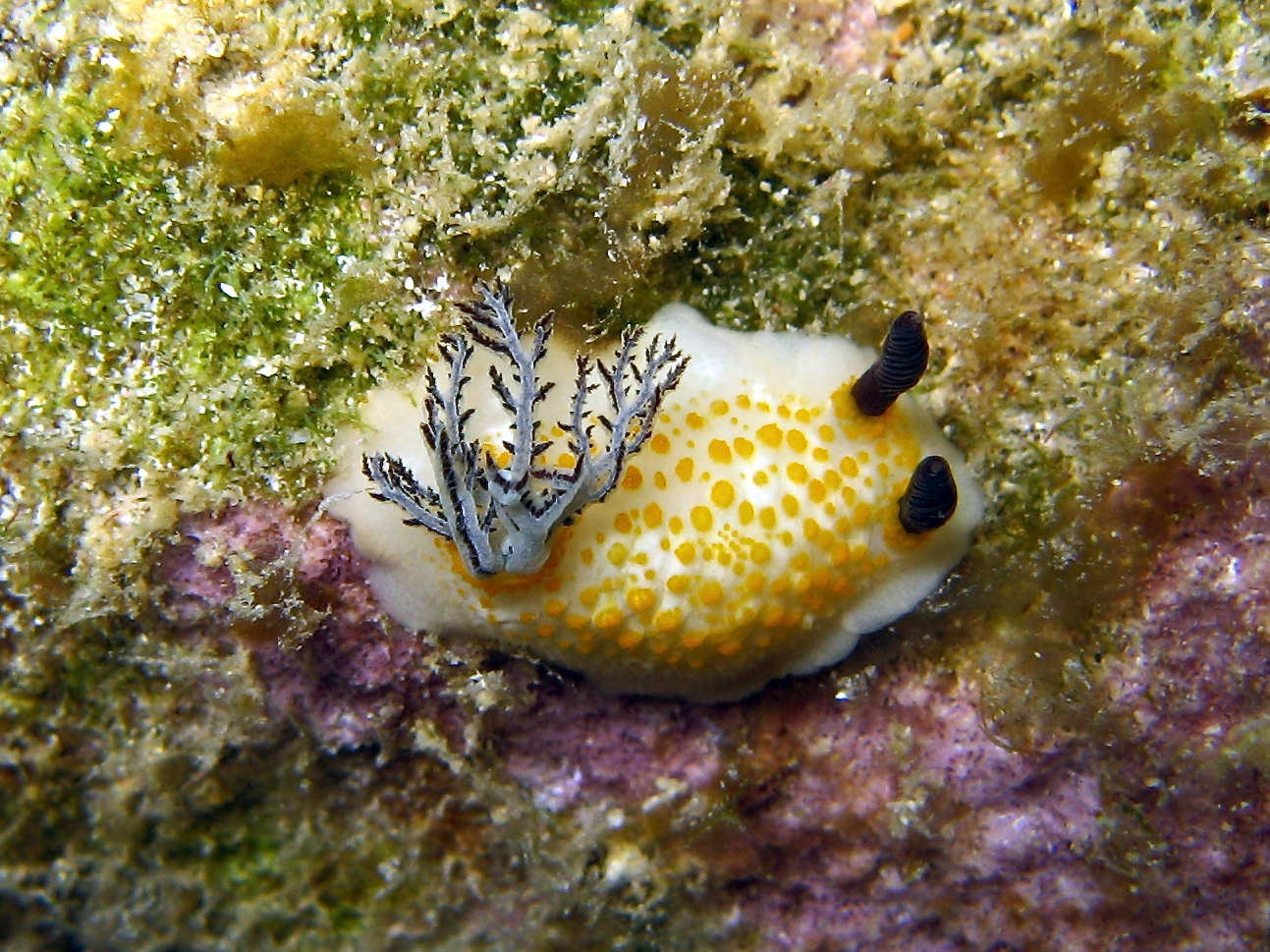
Taringa halgerda

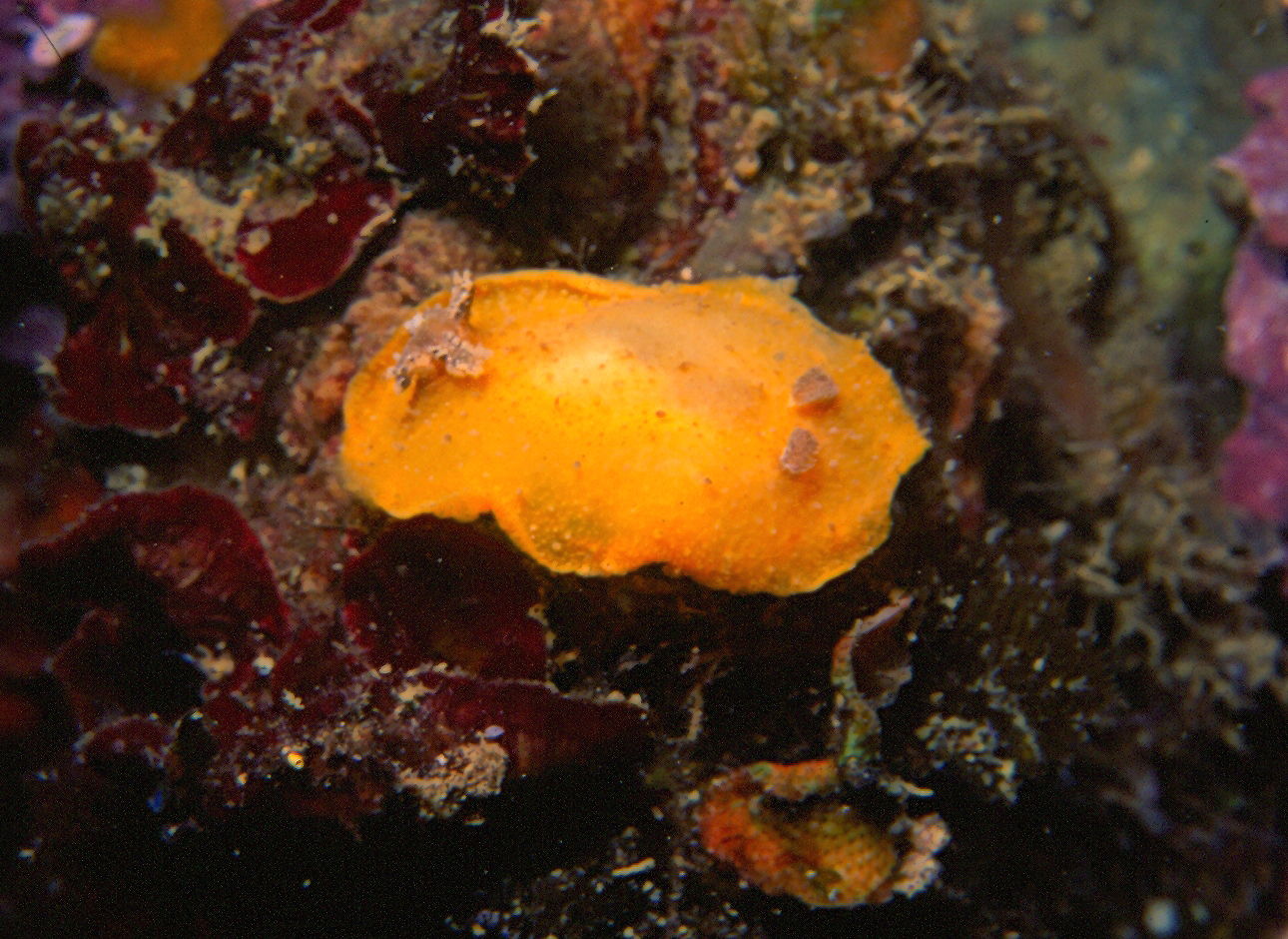
Thordisa filix

Genera brought into synonymy

- Adura [sic]: synonym of Audura Bergh, 1878: synonym of Jorunna Bergh, 1876
- Anisodoris Bergh, 1898: synonym of Diaulula Bergh, 1878
- Ansiodoris [sic]: synonym of Anisodoris Bergh, 1898: synonym of Diaulula Bergh, 1878
- Argus Bohadsch, 1761: synonym of Platydoris Bergh, 1877
- Audura Bergh, 1878 : synonym of Jorunna Bergh, 1876
- Awuka Er. Marcus, 1955 : synonym of Jorunna Bergh, 1876
- Boreodoris Odhner, 1939 : synonym of Rostanga Bergh, 1879
- Carryodoris Vayssière, 1919: synonym of Geitodoris Bergh, 1891
- Centrodoris P. Fischer, 1883 : synonym of Kentrodoris Bergh, 1874
- Discodorididae aliciae Dayrat, 2005: synonym of “Montereina” aliciae (Dayrat, 2005)
- Erythrodoris Pruvot-Fol, 1933: synonym of Discodoris Bergh, 1877
- Fracassa Bergh, 1878: synonym of Discodoris Bergh, 1877
- Glossodoridiformia O'Donoghue, 1927: synonym of Atagema Gray, 1850
- Kentrodoris Bergh, 1874 : synonym of Jorunna Bergh, 1876
- Montereina MacFarland, 1905: synonym of Peltodoris Bergh, 1880
- Otinodoris White, 1948 : synonym of Asteronotus Ehrenberg, 1831
- Peronodoris Bergh, 1904: synonym of Sclerodoris Eliot, 1904
- Petelodoris Bergh, 1882: synonym of Atagema Gray, 1850
- Phialodoris Bergh, 1890 : synonym of Peltodoris Bergh, 1880
- Phlegmodoris Bergh, 1878: synonym of Atagema Gray, 1850
- Pupsikus Er. Marcus & Ev. Marcus, 1970: synonym of Thordisa Bergh, 1877
- Trippa (gastropod)|Trippa Bergh, 1877 : synonym of Atagema Gray, 1850
- Tumbia Burn, 1962: synonym of Sclerodoris Eliot, 1904

== See also ==
- Dorididae, also known as Sea lemon.
