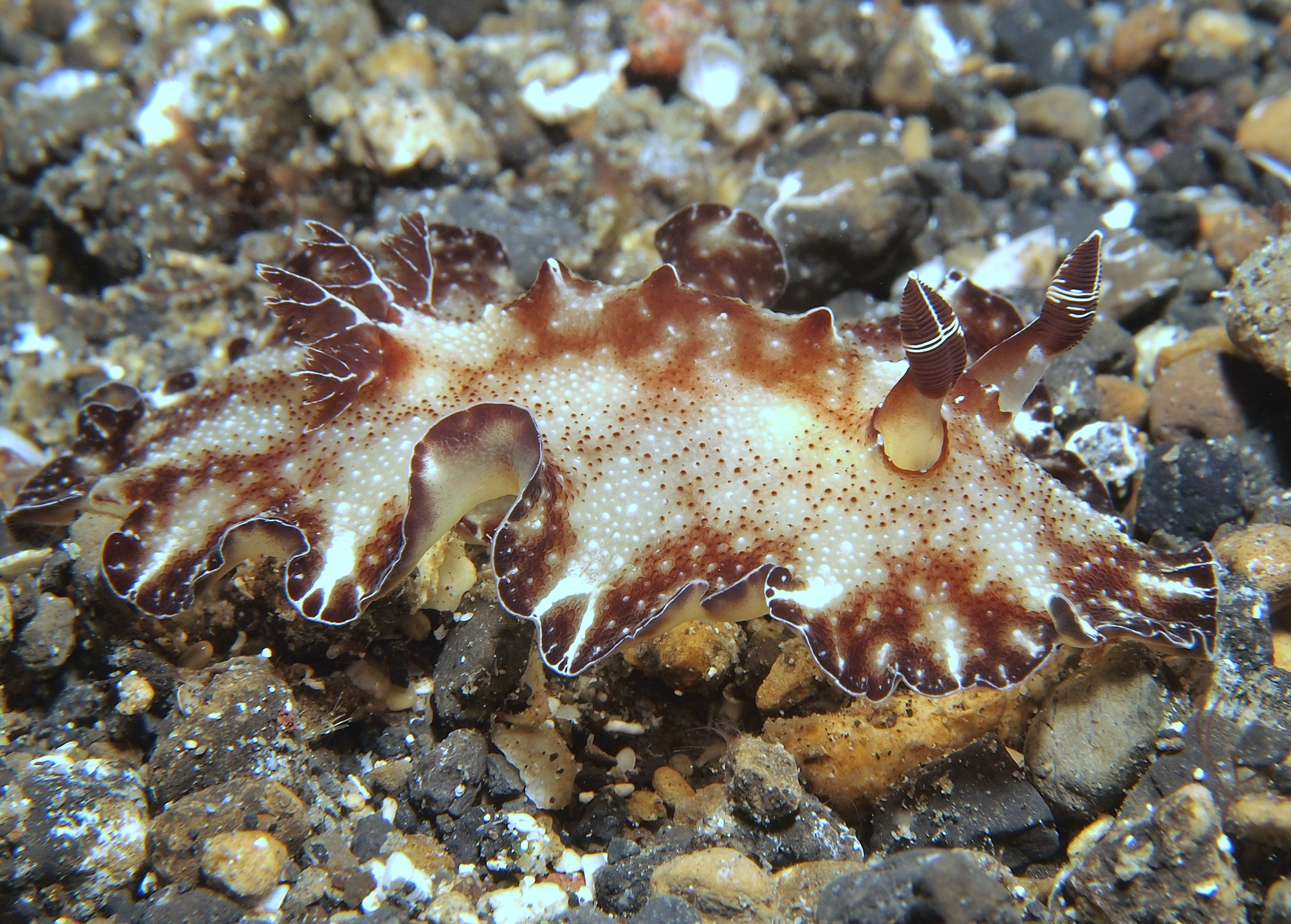
- Discodoris boholiensis

Scientific classification
- Kingdom: Animalia
- Phylum: Mollusca
- Class: Gastropoda
- Order: Nudibranchia
- Family: Discodorididae
- Genus: Discodoris; Bergh, 1877

Synonyms
- Erythrodoris Pruvot-Fol, 1933; Fracassa Bergh, 1878

= Discodoris =

Genus of gastropods

Discodoris is a genus of sea slugs, dorid nudibranchs, shell-less marine gastropod molluscs in the family Discodorididae.

== Species ==
Species in the genus Discodoris include:

- Discodoris achroma Valdés, 2001
- Discodoris aurila Marcus & Marcus, 1967
- Discodoris boholiensis Bergh, 1877
- Discodoris branneri MacFarland, 1909
- Discodoris cebuensis Bergh, 1877
- Discodoris coerulescens Bergh, 1888
- Discodoris erubescens Bergh, 1884
- Discodoris ghanensis Edmunds, 2011
- Discodoris glabella (Bergh, 1907)
- Discodoris labifera (Abraham, 1877)
- Discodoris laminea (Risbec, 1928)
- Discodoris natalensis (Krauss, 1848)
- Discodoris perplexa (Bergh, 1907)
- Discodoris pliconoto Moro & Ortea, 2015
- Discodoris pseudida (Bergh, 1907)
- Discodoris purcina Ev. Marcus & Er. Marcus, 1967
- Discodoris rosi Ortea, 1979
- Discodoris rubens Vayssière, 1919
- Discodoris sauvagei (Rochebrune, 1881)
- Discodoris stellifera Ihering in Vayssière, 1904
- Discodoris tristis Bergh, 1899
- Discodoris turia Burn, 1969

Species brought into synonymy

- Discodoris atromaculata (Bergh, 1880): synonym of Peltodoris atromaculata Bergh, 1880
- Discodoris cavernae (Starmühlner, 1955): synonym of Paradoris indecora (Bergh, 1881)
- Discodoris confusa Ballesteros, Llera & Ortea, 1985: synonym of Tayuva lilacina (Gould, 1852)
- Discodoris crawfordi Burn, 1969: synonym of Rostanga crawfordi (Burn, 1969)
- Discodoris dubia Bergh, 1904: synonym of Paradoris dubia (Bergh, 1904)
- Discodoris egena Bergh, 1904: synonym of Paradoris dubia (Bergh, 1904)
- Discodoris erythraeensis Vayssière, 1912: synonym of Paradoris erythraeensis (Vayssière, 1912)
- Discodoris evelinae Marcus, 1955: synonym of Montereina branneri (MacFarland, 1909)
- Discodoris fragilis Alder & Hancock, 1864: synonym of Sebadoris fragilis (Alder & Hancock, 1864)
- Discodoris fulva O'Donoghue, 1924: synonym of Geitodoris heathi (MacFarland, 1905)
- Discodoris golaia Marcus & Marcus, 1966: synonym of Montereina golaia (Marcus & Marcus, 1966)
- Discodoris heathi MacFarland, 1905: synonym of Geitodoris heathi (MacFarland, 1905)
- Discodoris hedgpethi Marcus & Marcus, 1960: synonym of Montereina branneri (MacFarland, 1909): synonym of Discodoris branneri MacFarland, 1909
- Discodoris hummelincki (Ev. Marcus & Er. Marcus, 1963): represented as Tayuva lilacina (Gould, 1852)
- Discodoris indecora Bergh, 1881: synonym of Paradoris indecora (Bergh, 1881)
- Discodoris ketos Ev. & Er. Marcus, 1967: synonym of Tayuva lilacina (Gould, 1852)
- Discodoris lilacina Gould, 1852: synonym of Tayuva lilacina (Gould, 1852)
- Discodoris liturata Bergh, 1905: synonym of Paradoris liturata (Bergh, 1905)
- Discodoris lora Marcus, 1965: synonym of Paradoris lora (Marcus, 1965)
- Discodoris lutescens Bergh, 1905: synonym of Rostanga lutescens (Bergh, 1905)
- Discodoris maculosa Bergh, 1884: synonym of Tayuva lilacina (Gould, 1852)
- Discodoris mauritiana Bergh, 1889: synonym of Peltodoris mauritiana Bergh, 1889, in turn synonym of Peltodoris murrea (Abraham, 1877)
- Discodoris mavis Marcus & Marcus, 1967: synonym of Geitodoris mavis (Marcus & Marcus, 1967)
- Discodoris meta Bergh, 1877: synonym of Discodoris boholiensis Bergh, 1877
- Discodoris millegrana Alder & Hancock, 1854: synonym of Aporodoris millegrana (Alder & Hancock, 1854)
- Discodoris modesta Bergh, 1877: synonym of Montereina modesta (Bergh, 1877)
- Discodoris morphaea Bergh, 1877: synonym of Sebadoris fragilis (Alder & Hancock, 1864)
- Discodoris mortenseni Ev. Marcus & Er. Marcus, 1963 is a synonym of Jorunna spazzola (Marcus, 1955)
- Discodoris notiperda Risbec, 1956: synonym of Sebadoris fragilis (Alder & Hancock, 1864)
- Discodoris opisthidia Bergh, 1877: synonym of Montereina opisthidia (Bergh, 1877)
- Discodoris pallida Baba, 1937: synonym of Montereina pallida (Baba, 1937)
- Discodoris palma Allan, 1933: synonym of Tayuva lilacina (Gould, 1852)
- Discodoris pardalis (Alder & Hancock, 1864): synonym of Montereina pardalis (Alder & Hancock, 1864)
- Discodoris paroa Burn, 1969: synonym of Montereina paroa (Burn, 1969)
- Discodoris phoca Ev. Marcus & Er. Marcus, 1967: synonym of Montereina phoca (Ev. Marcus & Er. Marcus, 1967)
- Discodoris planata is a synonym of Geitodoris planata
- Discodoris porri Vérany, 1846 : synonym of Paradoris indecora (Bergh, 1881)
- Discodoris punctifera Abraham, 1877: synonym of Montereina punctifera (Abraham, 1877)
- Discodoris pusae Marcus Er., 1955: synonym of Geitodoris pusae (Er. Marcus, 1955)
- Discodoris sandiegensis (J. G. Cooper, 1863): synonym of Diaulula sandiegensis (J. G. Cooper, 1863)
- Discodoris schmeltziana Bergh, 1880: synonym of Discodoris schmeltziana (Bergh, 1875)
- Discodoris tema Edmunds, 1968: synonym of Geitodoris tema (Edmunds, 1968)
- Discodoris vanikoro Pruvot-Fol, 1934: synonym of Sebadoris fragilis (Alder & Hancock, 1864)
- Discodoris wetleyi Allan, 1932: synonym of Jorunna funebris (Kelaart, 1859)

Nomine dubia and taxa inquirenda

- Discodoris concinna Alder & Hancock, 1864
- Discodoris crucis (Ørsted in Mörch, 1863)
- Discodoris edwardsi Vayssière, 1902 (taxon inquirendum)
- Discodoris muta Bergh, 1877
- Discodoris notha Bergh, 1877
- Discodoris patriziae Perrone, 1991
- Discodoris schmeltziana Bergh, 1880
- Discodoris sordii Perrone, 1990
- Discodoris voniheringi MacFarland, 1909
