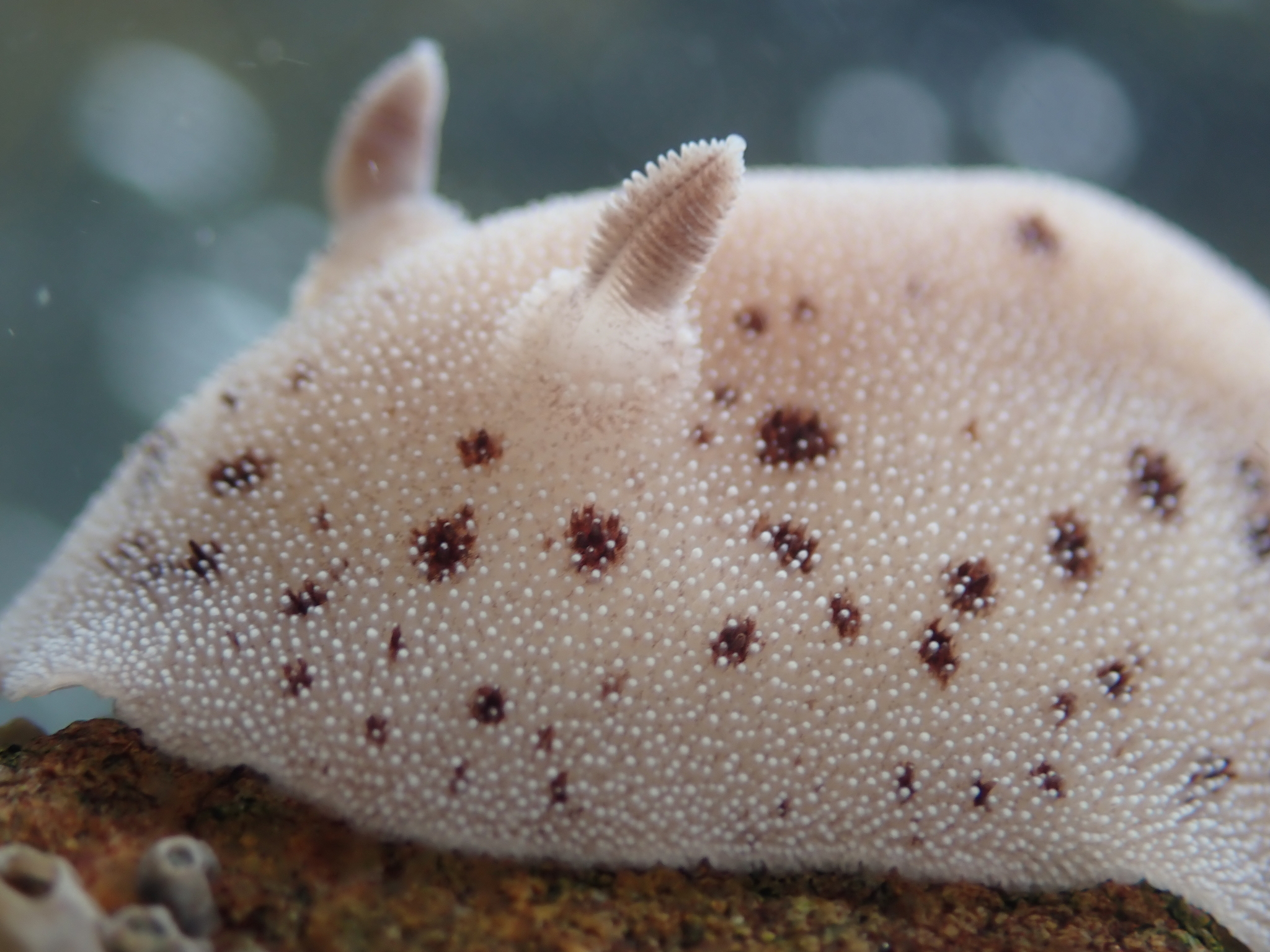
- Alloiodoris lanuginata

Scientific classification
- Kingdom: Animalia
- Phylum: Mollusca
- Class: Gastropoda
- Order: Nudibranchia
- Family: Discodorididae
- Genus: Alloiodoris; Bergh, 1904

= Alloiodoris =

Genus of gastropods

Alloiodoris is a genus of sea slugs, specifically dorid nudibranchs. They are marine gastropod molluscs in the family Discodorididae. Alloiodoris species are found in the Southern Hemisphere, in South Africa, Australia and New Zealand.

== Species ==
Species so far described in this genus include:

- Alloiodoris marmorata Bergh, 1904
- Alloiodoris inhacae O'Donoghue, 1929
- Alloiodoris lanuginata (Abraham, 1877)

== Synonyms ==
- Alloiodoris hedleyi is a synonym of Sebadoris fragilis
- Alloiodoris nivosus is a synonym of Paradoris dubia
