= Alloiodoris marmorata =

Scientific classification
- Kingdom: Animalia
- Phylum: Mollusca
- Class: Gastropoda
- Order: Nudibranchia
- Family: Discodorididae
- Genus: Alloiodoris
- Species: A. marmorata

Binomial name
- Alloiodoris marmorata Bergh, 1904

Species of gastropod

Alloiodoris marmorata is a species of sea slug or dorid nudibranch, a marine gastropod mollusk in the family Discodorididae.
