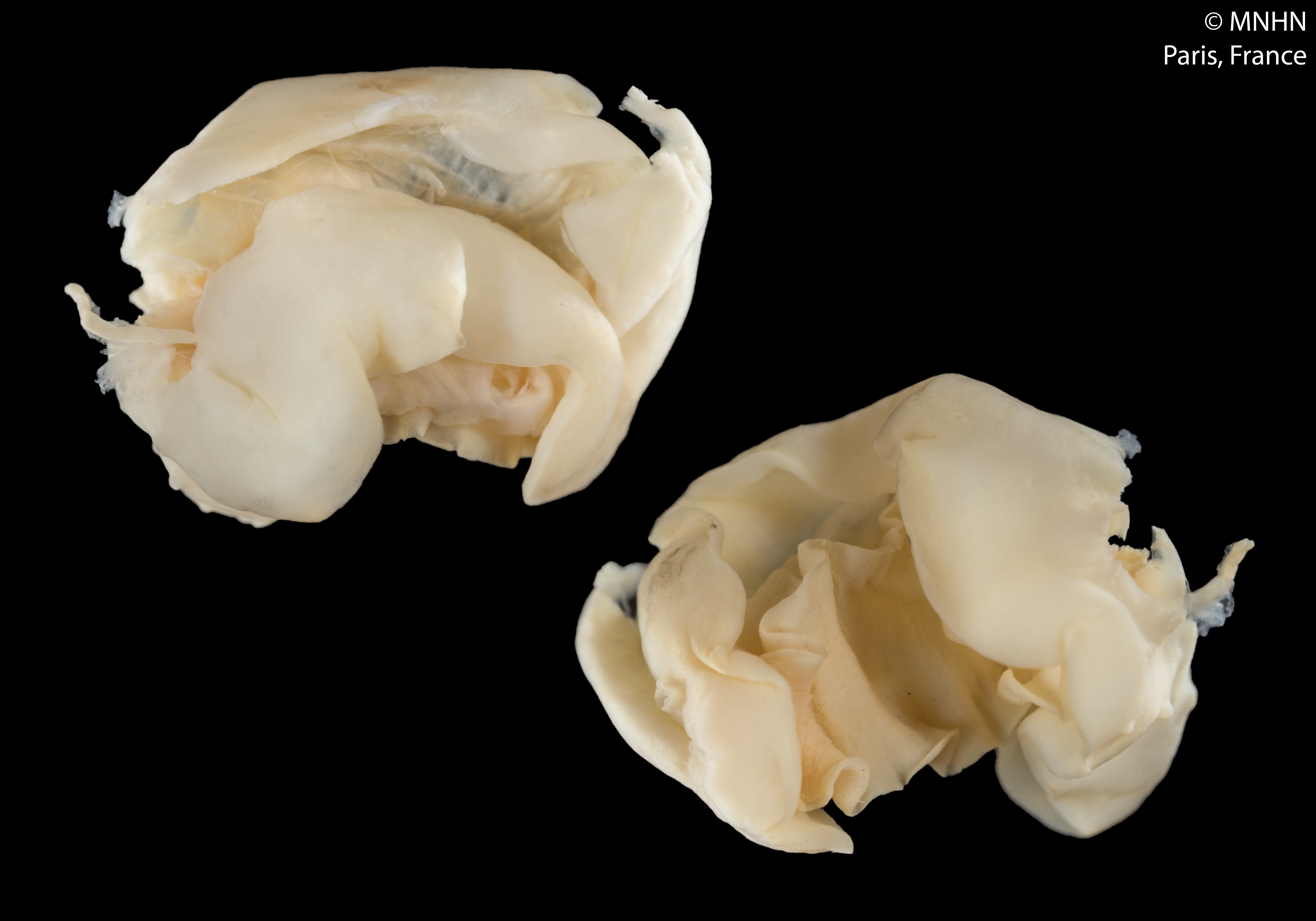
- Shell of Paradoris ceneris (holotype at MNHN, Paris)

Scientific classification
- Domain: Eukaryota
- Kingdom: Animalia
- Phylum: Mollusca
- Class: Gastropoda
- Order: Nudibranchia
- Family: Discodorididae
- Genus: Paradoris
- Species: P. ceneris

Binomial name
- Paradoris ceneris Ortea, 1995

= Paradoris ceneris =

Species of gastropod

Paradoris ceneris is a species of sea slug, a dorid nudibranch, shell-less marine opisthobranch gastropod mollusks in the family Discodorididae.

== Taxonomy ==
Defended as valid by Valdés (2002) but considered a synonym of Paradoris indecora by Dayrat (2006)

== Distribution ==
This marine species occurs off Lanzarote, Canary Islands
