= Rosi =

Rosi or ROSI may refer to

== People ==
=== Last name ===
- Aleandro Rosi, Italian footballer
- Alessandro Rosi, Italian Baroque artist
- Francesco Rosi, Italian film director
- Gianfranco Rosi (boxer), Italian boxer
- Gianfranco Rosi (director), Italian film director
- Stelvio Rosi, also known as Stan Cooper, Italian film actor

=== First name ===
- Rosi Braidotti, philosopher and feminist theoretician
- Rosi Golan, Israeli-born singer songwriter
- Rosi Manger, Swiss curler
- Rosi Mittermaier, alpine skier
- Rosi Sánchez, Spanish basketball player
- Rosi Sexton, mixed martial artist
- Rosi Speiser, German alpine skier
- Rosianna Silalahi, Indonesian news presenter known as "Rosi"

== Popular culture ==
- Cohen vs. Rosi, 1998 Argentine romantic comedy film
- Starring Rosi, experimental rock album in the Krautrock genre by Ash Ra Tempel

== Fauna ==
- Discodoris rosi, species of sea slug

== River ==
- Rosi Khola, Rosi river in Nepal

== Acronyms ==
- ROSI, Reverse osmosis solar installation
