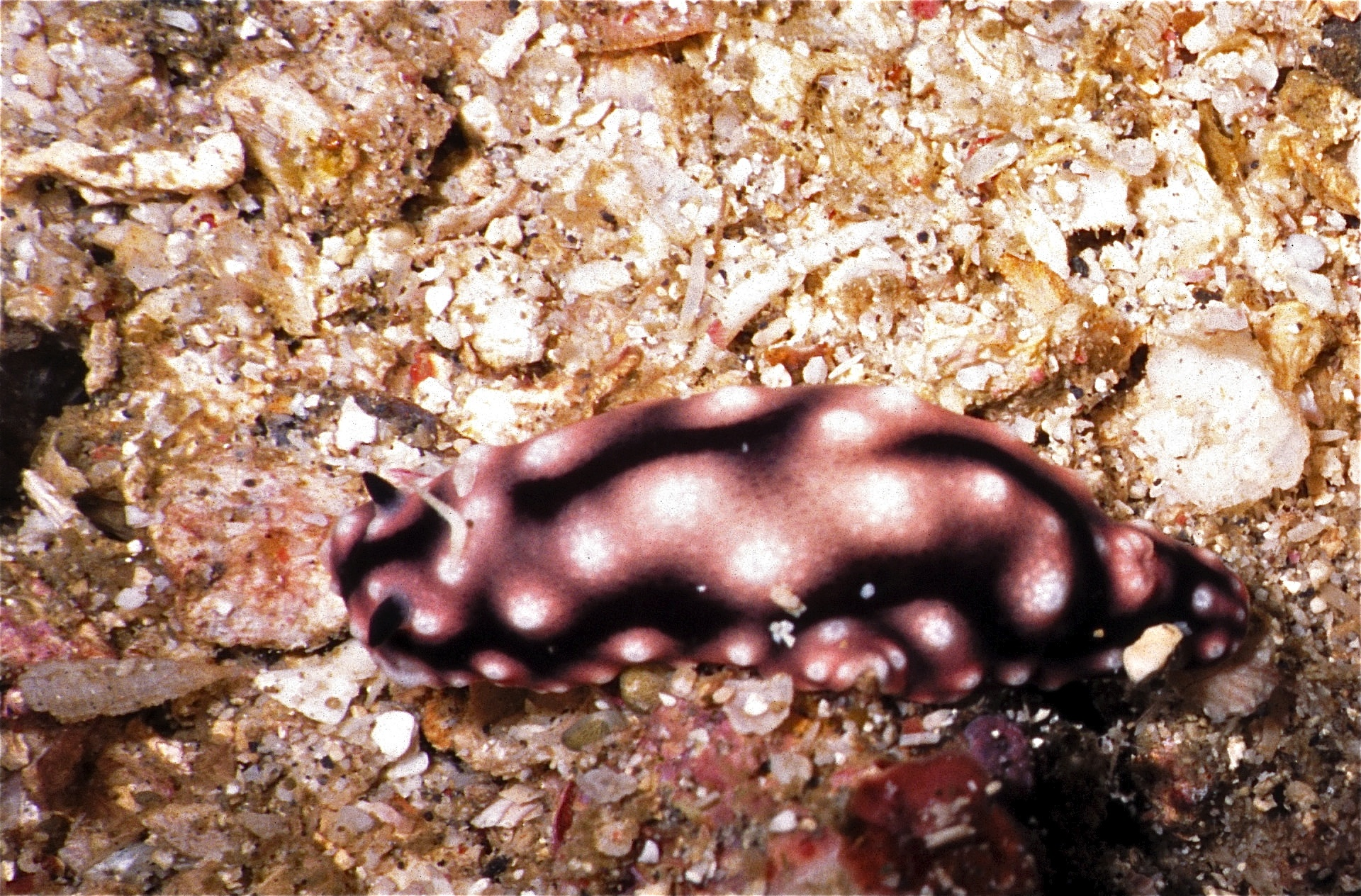
- Paradoris liturata

Scientific classification
- Kingdom: Animalia
- Phylum: Mollusca
- Class: Gastropoda
- Order: Nudibranchia
- Infraorder: Doridoidei
- Superfamily: Doridoidea
- Family: Discodorididae
- Genus: Paradoris; Bergh, 1884

Synonyms
- Percunas Ev. Marcus, 1971

= Paradoris =

Genus of gastropods

Paradoris is a genus of sea slugs, dorid nudibranchs, shell-less marine gastropod mollusks in the family Discodorididae.

== Species ==
Species in the genus Paradoris include:

- Paradoris adamsae Padula & Valdés, 2012
- Paradoris annularis Ortea, Espinosa & Moro, 2017
- Paradoris araneosa Valdés, 2001
- Paradoris caerulea Camacho-García & Gosliner, 2007
- Paradoris ceneris Ortea, 1995
- Paradoris dubia (Bergh, 1904)
- Paradoris erythraeensis (Vayssière, 1912)
- Paradoris hypocrita Yonow, 2020
- Paradoris imperfecta Valdés, 2001
- Paradoris indecora (Bergh, 1881)
- Paradoris inversa Ortea, 1995
- Paradoris liturata (Bergh, 1905)
- Paradoris lopezi Hermosillo & Valdés, 2004
- Paradoris mollis Ortea, 1995
- Paradoris mulciber (Ev. Marcus, 1971)
- Paradoris tsurugensis Baba, 1986

Species brought into synonymy

- Paradoris caeruleus Camacho-García & Gosliner, 2007: synonym of Paradoris caerulea Camacho-García & Gosliner, 2007 (wrong grammatical agreement of specific epithet)
- Paradoris cavernae Starmülhner, 1955: synonym of Paradoris indecora (Bergh, 1881)
- Paradoris granulata Bergh, 1884: synonym of Paradoris indecora (Bergh, 1881)
- Paradoris leuca Miller 1995: synonym of Paradoris dubia (Bergh, 1904)

Nomen dubium

- Paradoris lora (Marcus, 1965) (nomen dubium)
