= Discodoris stellifera =

Scientific classification
- Kingdom: Animalia
- Phylum: Mollusca
- Class: Gastropoda
- Order: Nudibranchia
- Family: Discodorididae
- Genus: Discodoris
- Species: D. stellifera

Binomial name
- Discodoris stellifera Ihering in Vayssière, 1904

Species of gastropod

Discodoris stellifera is a species of sea slug, a dorid nudibranch, shell-less marine gastropod mollusks in the family Discodorididae.

== Distribution ==
Discodoris stellifera is found off the coasts of Southern France, Spain, and Portugal.
