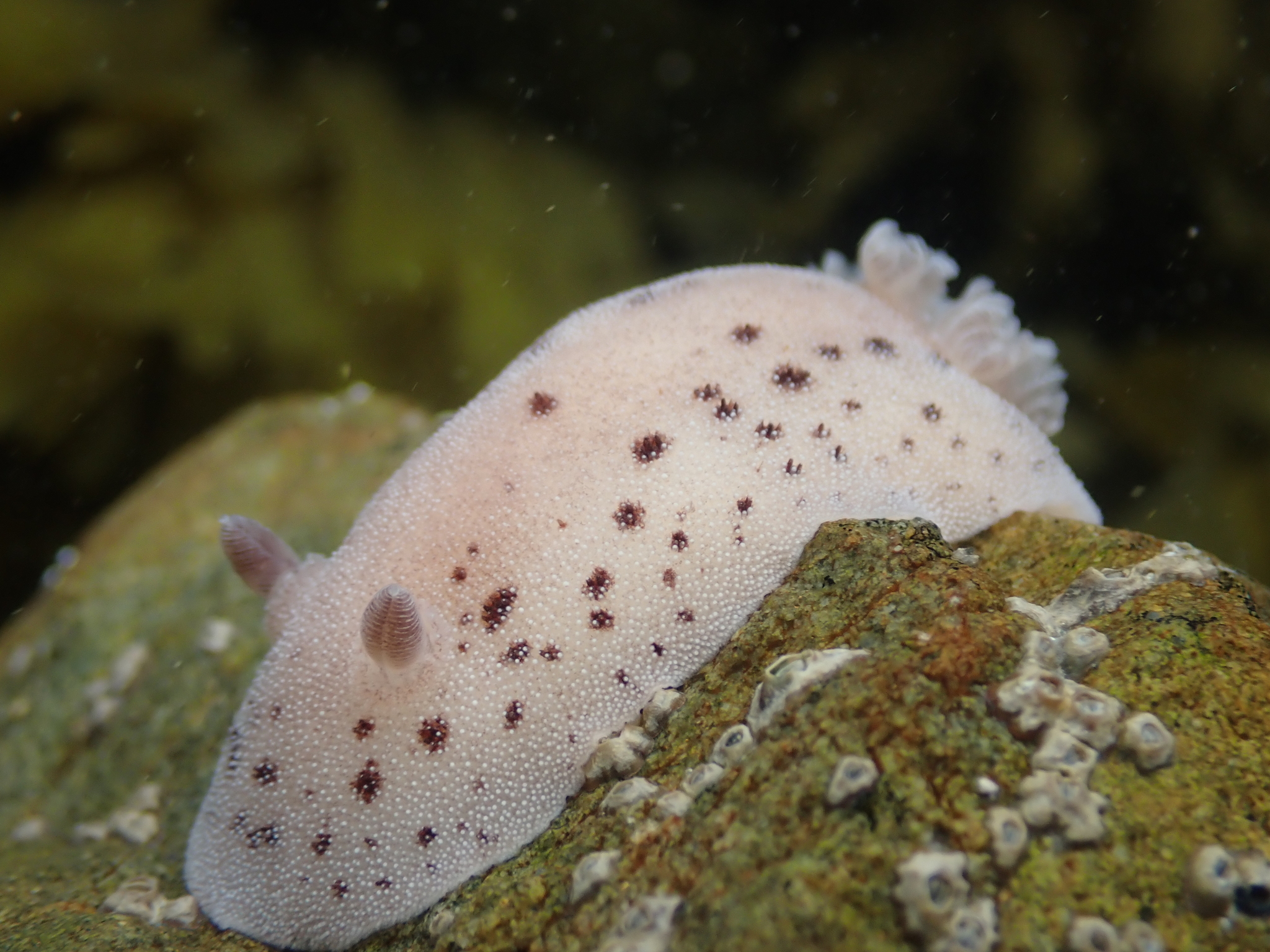

Scientific classification
- Kingdom: Animalia
- Phylum: Mollusca
- Class: Gastropoda
- Order: Nudibranchia
- Family: Discodorididae
- Genus: Alloiodoris
- Species: A. lanuginata

Binomial name
- Alloiodoris lanuginata (Abraham, 1877)

Synonyms
- Doris lanuginata Abraham, 1877

= Alloiodoris lanuginata =

Species of gastropod

Alloiodoris lanuginata is a species of sea slug or dorid nudibranch, a marine gastropod mollusk in the family Discodorididae.

== Distribution ==
This species is endemic to New Zealand.

== Description ==
Alloiodoris lanuginata is a dorid nudibranch with a velvet surface. It is beige or brown in colour with scattered dark brown spots.
