= Discodoris pseudida =

Scientific classification
- Kingdom: Animalia
- Phylum: Mollusca
- Class: Gastropoda
- Order: Nudibranchia
- Family: Discodorididae
- Genus: Discodoris
- Species: D. pseudida

Binomial name
- Discodoris pseudida Bergh, 1907

Synonyms
- Doris pseudida Bergh, 1907

Species of gastropod

Discodoris pseudida is a species of sea slug, a dorid nudibranch, shell-less marine opisthobranch gastropod mollusks in the family Discodorididae.
