= Photokinesis =

Biological form of movement

Photokinesis is a change in the velocity of movement of an organism as a result of changes in light intensity. The alteration in speed is independent of the direction from which the light is shining. Photokinesis is described as positive if the velocity of travel is greater with an increase in light intensity and negative if the velocity is slower. If a group of organisms with a positive photokinetic response is swimming in a partially shaded environment, there will be fewer organisms per unit of volume in the sunlit portion than in the shaded parts. This may be beneficial for the organisms if it is unfavourable to their predators, or it may be propitious to them in their quest for prey.

In photosynthetic prokaryotes, the mechanism for photokinesis appears to be an energetic process. In cyanobacteria, for example, an increase in illumination results in an increase of photophosphorylation which enables an increase in metabolic activity. However the behaviour is also found among eukaryotic microorganisms, including those like Astasia longa which are not photosynthetic, and in these, the mechanism is not fully understood. In Euglena gracilis, the rate of swimming has been shown to speed up with increased light intensity until the light reaches a certain saturation level, beyond which the swimming rate declines.

The sea slug Discodoris boholiensis also displays positive photokinesis; it is nocturnal and moves slowly at night, but much faster when caught in the open during daylight hours. Moving faster in the exposed environment should reduce predation and enable it to conceal itself as soon as possible, but its brain is quite incapable of working this out. Photokinesis is common in tunicate larvae, which accumulate in areas with low light intensity just before settlement, and the behaviour is also present in juvenile fish such as sockeye salmon smolts.

== See also ==
- Kinesis (biology)
- Phototaxis
- Phototropism
