= Doris januarii =

Scientific classification
- Kingdom: Animalia
- Phylum: Mollusca
- Class: Gastropoda
- Order: Nudibranchia
- Family: Dorididae
- Genus: Doris
- Species: D. januarii

Binomial name
- Doris januarii (Bergh, 1878)

Species of gastropod

Doris januarii is a species of sea slug, a dorid nudibranch, a marine gastropod mollusk in the family Dorididae.

== Taxonomic history ==
This species was described by Rudolph Bergh in 1878 but considered to be a synonym of Doris verrucosa by von Ihering, 1886 and subsequent authors. A detailed anatomical comparison of these species concluded that they were distinct species.

== Distribution ==
This species occurs on the Atlantic Ocean coast of Brazil, from Pernambuco to São Paulo.

== Ecology ==
This species lives at depths up to 12 m in the rocky subtidal region, near areas covered by the encrusting sponge Hymeniacidon heliophila (Parker, 1910) during the reproductive season.
