= Chromodoris albolimbata =

Scientific classification
- Kingdom: Animalia
- Phylum: Mollusca
- Class: Gastropoda
- Order: Nudibranchia
- Family: Chromodorididae
- Genus: Chromodoris
- Species: C. albolimbata

Binomial name
- Chromodoris albolimbata Bergh, 1907

Species of gastropod

Chromodoris albolimbata is a species of colourful sea slug, a dorid nudibranch, a marine gastropod mollusc in the family Chromodorididae.

== Distribution ==
This species was described from a single specimen collected at 37 m depth off Sebastian Bluff (Saint Sebastian Point), near Stilbaai, South Africa.

== Description ==
The description of the external appearance of this species is brief and it may be impossible to recognise it. The description reads "The colour clear reddish-white, the brim of the back chalk-white". The specimen was 15 mm in length.
