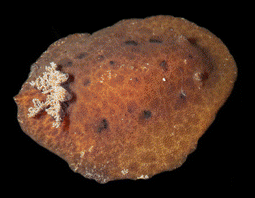
- Dorsal view of Discodoris branneri

Scientific classification
- Kingdom: Animalia
- Phylum: Mollusca
- Class: Gastropoda
- Order: Nudibranchia
- Family: Discodorididae
- Genus: Discodoris
- Species: D. branneri

Binomial name
- Discodoris branneri MacFarland, 1909

Synonyms
- Discodoris evelinae Er. Marcus, 1955; Discodoris hedgpethi Marcus & Marcus, 1960; Montereina branneri (MacFarland, 1909)

= Discodoris branneri =

Species of gastropod

Discodoris branneri is a species of sea slug, a dorid nudibranch, shell-less marine gastropod mollusks in the family Discodorididae.

== Distribution ==
The distribution of Discodoris branneri includes Florida, Texas, Costa Rica, Honduras, Panama, Colombia, Venezuela, Bahamas, Cayman Islands, Puerto Rico, Jamaica, Barbados, Martinique, St. Lucia, Guadeloupe, St. Vincent and the Grenadines, Brazil.

== Description ==
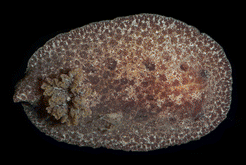
Dorsal view of Discodoris branneri.

The body is oval, moderately rigid. Dorsum is covered by numerous conical tubercles. Background color is variable, from cream to purplish brown, sometimes with black or white patches and spots. Rhinophores and gill are usually the same color as the dorsum with white tips. The maximum recorded length is 110 mm.

== Habitat ==
Minimum recorded depth is 0 m; maximum recorded depth is 7 m. It was found under rocks in Panama. Members of this family feed on sponges.

When disturbed, this species autotomizes parts of the mantle.
