= Discodoris ghanensis =

Scientific classification
- Kingdom: Animalia
- Phylum: Mollusca
- Class: Gastropoda
- Order: Nudibranchia
- Family: Discodorididae
- Genus: Discodoris
- Species: D. ghanensis

Binomial name
- Discodoris ghanensis Edmunds, 2011

Synonyms
- Montereina ghanensis (Edmunds, 2011)

Species of gastropod

Discodoris ghanensis is a species of sea slug, a dorid nudibranch, shell-less marine opisthobranch gastropod mollusks in the family Discodorididae.

== Distribution ==
Discodoris ghanensis, like its name suggests, is found off the coast of Ghana.
