= Discodoris natalensis =

Scientific classification
- Kingdom: Animalia
- Phylum: Mollusca
- Class: Gastropoda
- Order: Nudibranchia
- Family: Discodorididae
- Genus: Discodoris
- Species: D. natalensis

Binomial name
- Discodoris natalensis Krauss, 1848

Synonyms
- Doris natalensis Krauss, 1848

Species of gastropod

Discodoris natalensis is a species of sea slug, a dorid nudibranch, shell-less marine opisthobranch gastropod mollusks in the family Discodorididae.
