= Discodoris turia =

Scientific classification
- Kingdom: Animalia
- Phylum: Mollusca
- Class: Gastropoda
- Order: Nudibranchia
- Family: Discodorididae
- Genus: Discodoris
- Species: D. turia

Binomial name
- Discodoris turia Burn, 1969

Species of gastropod

Discodoris turia is a species of sea slug or dorid nudibranch, a marine gastropod mollusc in the family Discodorididae.
