= Discodoris labifera =

Scientific classification
- Kingdom: Animalia
- Phylum: Mollusca
- Class: Gastropoda
- Order: Nudibranchia
- Family: Discodorididae
- Genus: Discodoris
- Species: D. labifera

Binomial name
- Discodoris labifera Abraham, 1877

Synonyms
- Montereina labifera (Abraham, 1877); Doris labifera Abraham, 1877

Species of gastropod

Discodoris labifera is a species of sea slug, a dorid nudibranch, shell-less marine opisthobranch gastropod mollusks in the family Discodorididae.

== Distribution ==
Discodoris labifera is found of the coast of Sri Lanka.
