= Discodoris purcina =

Scientific classification
- Kingdom: Animalia
- Phylum: Mollusca
- Class: Gastropoda
- Order: Nudibranchia
- Family: Discodorididae
- Genus: Discodoris
- Species: D. purcina

Binomial name
- Discodoris purcina Ev. Marcus & Er. Marcus, 1967

Species of gastropod

Discodoris purcina is a species of sea slug or dorid nudibranch, a marine gastropod mollusk in the family Discodorididae.
