= Discodoris perplexa =

Scientific classification
- Kingdom: Animalia
- Phylum: Mollusca
- Class: Gastropoda
- Order: Nudibranchia
- Family: Discodorididae
- Genus: Discodoris
- Species: D. perplexa

Binomial name
- Discodoris perplexa Bergh, 1907

Synonyms
- Doris perplexa Bergh, 1907

Species of gastropod

Discodoris perplexa is a species of sea slug, a dorid nudibranch, shell-less marine opisthobranch gastropod mollusks in the family Discodorididae.
