= Discodoris pliconoto =

Scientific classification
- Domain: Eukaryota
- Kingdom: Animalia
- Phylum: Mollusca
- Class: Gastropoda
- Order: Nudibranchia
- Family: Discodorididae
- Genus: Discodoris
- Species: D. pliconoto

Binomial name
- Discodoris pliconoto Moro & Ortea, 2015

Species of gastropod

Discodoris pliconoto is a species of sea slug, a dorid nudibranch, shell-less marine opisthobranch gastropod molluscs in the family Discodorididae.

== Distribution ==
This species was described from the island of Sal, Cape Verde. The specimens were found in the intertidal zone or up to 1 m depth.

== Description ==
Discodoris pliconoto is a large dorid nudibranch, growing to at least 80 mm in length. It is cream-white in colour with diffuse spots of pale brown.
