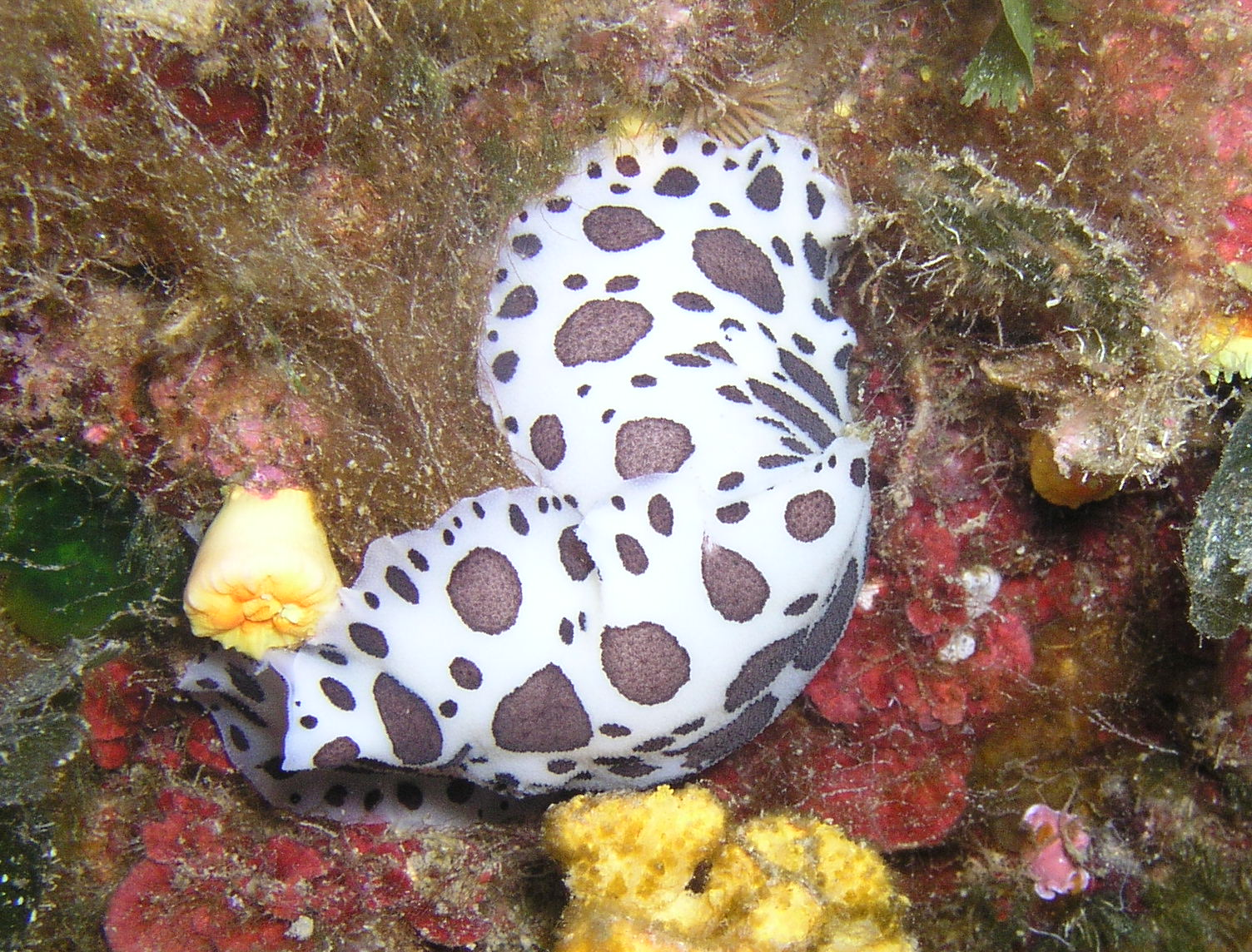
- Peltodoris atromaculata

Scientific classification
- Kingdom: Animalia
- Phylum: Mollusca
- Class: Gastropoda
- Order: Nudibranchia
- Family: Discodorididae
- Genus: Peltodoris
- Species: P. atromaculata

Binomial name
- Peltodoris atromaculata Bergh, 1880

Synonyms
- Discodoris atromaculata

= Peltodoris atromaculata =

Species of gastropod

Peltodoris atromaculata, more commonly known as the dotted sea slug or sea cow, is a species of sea slug, a dorid nudibranch, a marine gastropod mollusk in the family Discodorididae. It dwells in salt water up to the depth of 40m. It is exclusively found in precorralligene and coralligene communities and is very common in such communities.

In the wild, Peltodoris is most abundant between June and September. Adults individuals can be found throughout the year, and two separate generations can coexist at the same time.

While Peltodoris is commonly filed under the genus Discodoris, some studies suggest that there may be a large enough difference in their morphology (e.g. the jaws) for it to be classified as a separate genus.

== Distribution ==
Dotted sea slugs are found almost exclusively in the Mediterranean Sea. There has also been a single report of sighting in the Atlantic Ocean from the Bay of Biscay to the Azores.

== Description ==
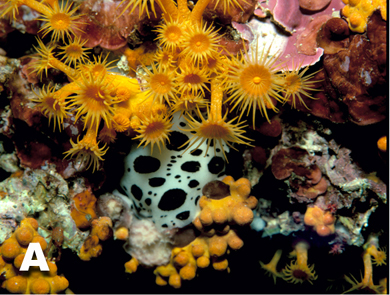
Peltodoris atromaculata between Parazoanthus

Peltodoris is characterized by brown spots distributed randomly on its white mantle, each spot has a border of a darker brown color. The spots are generally darkest around the center of the mantle. Different populations exhibit different amounts of brown spots, and there is a general pattern of increasing coverage from west to east.

== Life-cycle and growth ==
=== Spawning ===
Reproduction is restricted during the summer, during which the animal will spawn for 3–4 days, followed by 2–3 weeks without spawning, after which the cycle restarts. Adult individuals that are spawning experience a decrease in body size and weight which continues after oviposition. All individuals of the species are simultaneous hermaphrodites. During mating, both animals engage each other with their penises, and the one that successfully penetrates the body wall of the other becomes the male. The eggs of Peltodoris lay are spiral shaped and white-yellow in color which measure around 180μm in diameter.

=== Growth ===
After the eggs hatch they develop into a planktonic larvae. The larvae are chemically attracted to fulvinol-like polyacetylenes produced exclusively by their food sponges Petrosia and Haliclona, which can trigger settlement.

Adults generally grow to an average length of 5 to 7 cm, and are able to grow up to 12 cm. The sizes of brown spots on the mantle increase proportionally with mantle area as the slug grows. However, coverage of the brown spots never exceeds 50% of the mantle area. Each individual has a unique pattern of spots which may change with growth but remain distinct from one another. The animals grow fastest around the first 6–7 months of their lifespan, growth rate slows for the following 4–5 months and a final decrease in growth rate occurs 3–4 months before death.

=== Life span ===
In the wild, Peltodoris exhibits an annual life-cycle, but have been observed to live up to 15 months in the laboratory. They generally die a few weeks after reproduction.

== Diet ==
Peltodoris relies exclusively on the sponges Petrosia ficiforms and Haliclona fulva as its food source, which is detects using chemotaxis. There are no other species know to prey on P. ficiforms and H. fulva, due to the fulvinol-like polyacetylenes produced by the sponges as a secondary metabolite, which are known to be cytotoxic. This lack of competition allows Peltodoris to relatively unrestricted by food availability. While Peltodoris prefers to feed on Haliclona over Petrosia, Petrosia are more numerous leading Peltodoris to feed mainly on Petrosia. In rare occasions, Peltodoris will feed on parts of its own mantle tissue. There are no observed daily and seasonal variation in the feeding habits of Peltodoris.

== Defense mechanisms ==
Peltodoris has two main defense mechanisms that have been confirmed: mantle spicules and disruptive coloration. Unlike most dorid species, Peltodoris do not utilize chemical defense through the absorption of cytotoxic chemicals from their prey.

=== Mantle spicules ===
The mantle spicules are composed of calcite (CaCO_{3}) and brucite (Mg(OH)_{2}) and fluorite (Ca_{2}F), with calcite making up the largest percentage and fluorite the least. These deter predators by causing physical harm when the predator comes into contact with the spicules.

=== Disruptive coloration ===
The bright coloration on the mantle of Peltodoris serves as aposematic signals which warns predators of protective mechanisms, making predators less likely to attack.

=== Mucus ===
A colorless mucus secreted from the mantle of Peltodoris both when the animal is stressed and under normal conditions. The fluid has a relatively neutral pH between 6 and 7. However, it is uncertain whether the mucus plays a role in defense.

== Autotomy ==
Certain Peltodoris individuals will undergo autotomy of the mantle margin before death. During this process, most of the mantle is lost except small parts around the gills and head. Most slugs die right after autotomization, a small number are able to survive for a few hours after autotomization but only for maximum 2–3 hours. Unlike in many other animals, autotomy in Peltodoris is not reversible and is not used for defense, but merely a senescent process.
