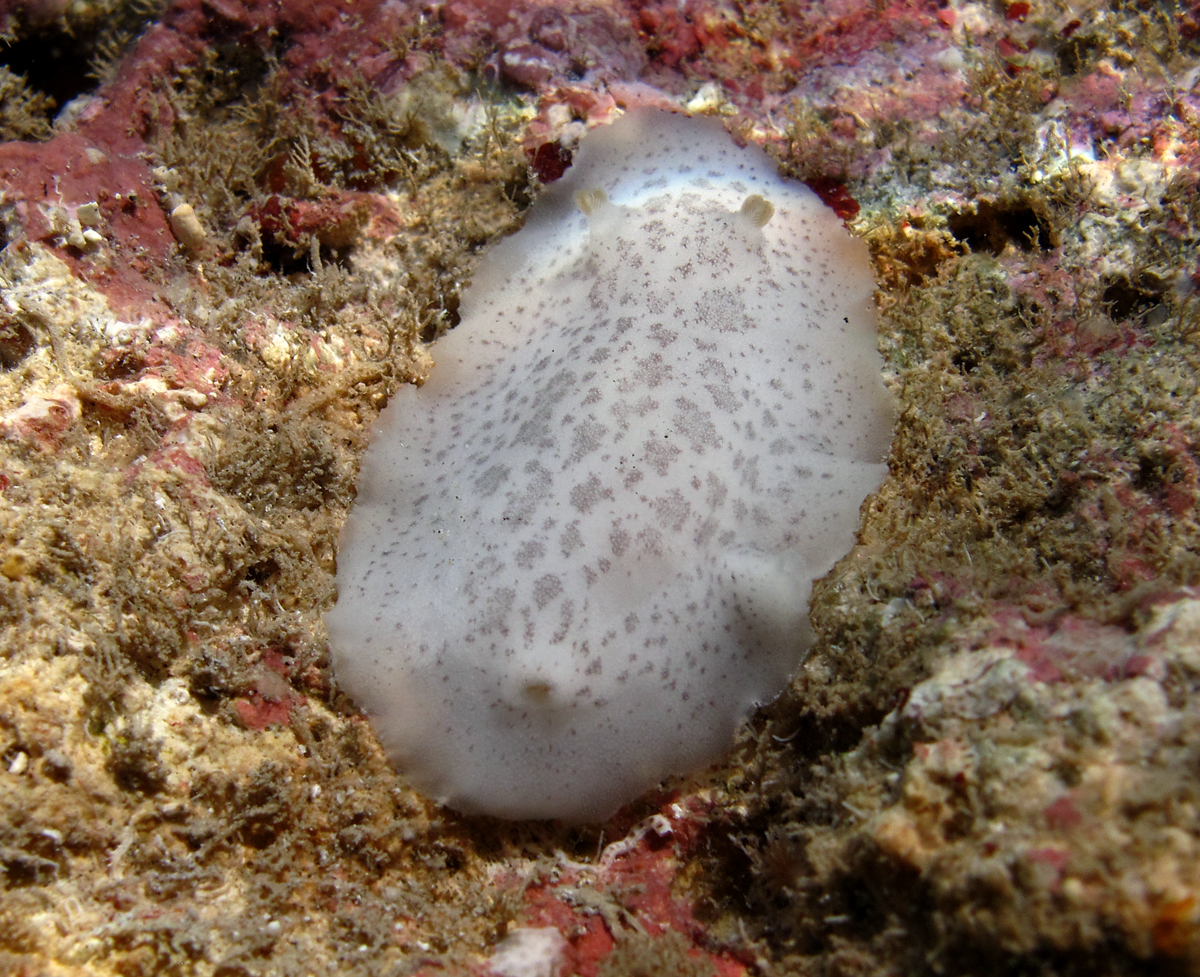

Scientific classification
- Kingdom: Animalia
- Phylum: Mollusca
- Class: Gastropoda
- Order: Nudibranchia
- Family: Discodorididae
- Genus: Discodoris
- Species: D. coerulescens

Binomial name
- Discodoris coerulescens Bergh, 1888

Synonyms
- Montereina achroma (Bergh, 1888)

= Discodoris coerulescens =

Species of gastropod

Discodoris coerulescens is a species of sea slug, a dorid nudibranch, shell-less marine opisthobranch gastropod mollusks in the family Discodorididae.

== Distribution ==
Discodoris coerulescens is found off the coasts of Oman and the Philippines.
