= Discodoris erubescens =

Scientific classification
- Kingdom: Animalia
- Phylum: Mollusca
- Class: Gastropoda
- Order: Nudibranchia
- Family: Discodorididae
- Genus: Discodoris
- Species: D. erubescens

Binomial name
- Discodoris erubescens (Bergh, 1884)

Synonyms
- “Montereina” erubescens (Bergh, 1884) · accepted, alternate representation

Species of gastropod

Discodoris erubescens is a species of sea slug, a dorid nudibranch, shell-less marine gastropod mollusks in the family Discodorididae.

== Distribution ==
This species occurs in European waters.
