= Discodoris tristis =

Scientific classification
- Kingdom: Animalia
- Phylum: Mollusca
- Class: Gastropoda
- Order: Nudibranchia
- Family: Discodorididae
- Genus: Discodoris
- Species: D. tristis

Binomial name
- Discodoris tristis Bergh, 1899

Species of gastropod

Discodoris tristis is a species of sea slug, a dorid nudibranch, shell-less marine opisthobranch gastropod mollusks in the family Discodorididae.

== Distribution ==
Discodoris tristis is found off the coast of Brazil.
