= Discodoris laminea =

Scientific classification
- Kingdom: Animalia
- Phylum: Mollusca
- Class: Gastropoda
- Order: Nudibranchia
- Family: Discodorididae
- Genus: Discodoris
- Species: D. laminea

Binomial name
- Discodoris laminea Risbec, 1928

Synonyms
- Argus laminea (Risbec, 1928); Platydoris laminea Risbec, 1928

Species of gastropod

Discodoris laminea is a species of sea slug, a dorid nudibranch, shell-less marine opisthobranch gastropod mollusks in the family Discodorididae.

== Distribution ==
Discodoris laminea is found of the coasts of New Caledonia.
