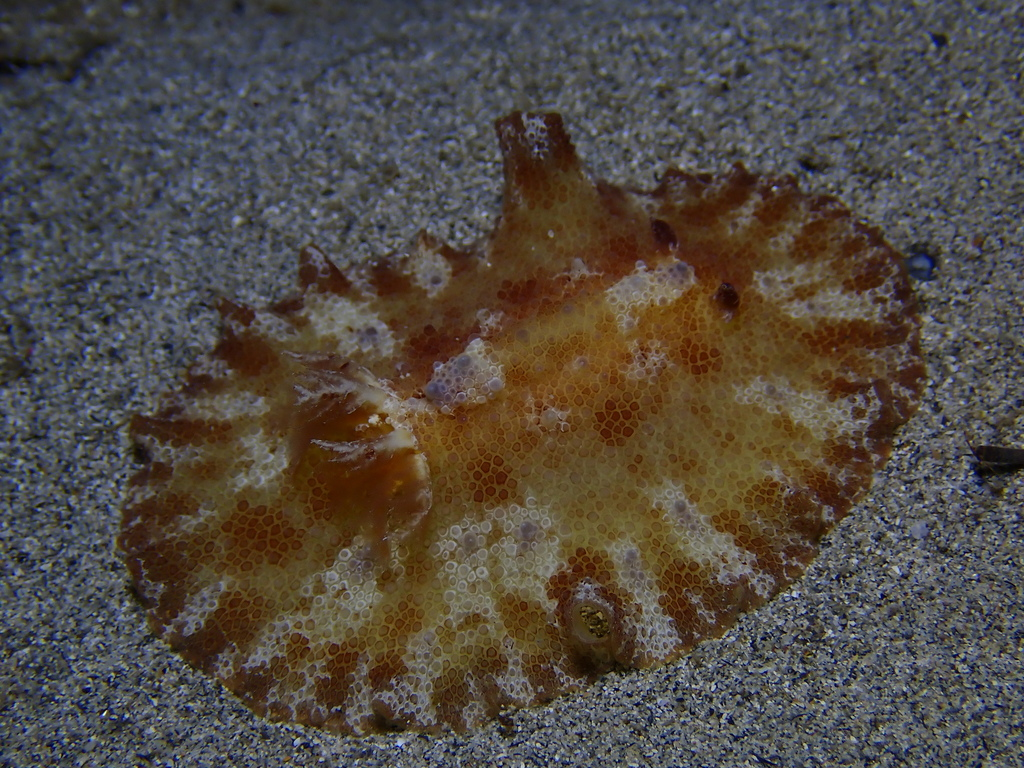

Scientific classification
- Kingdom: Animalia
- Phylum: Mollusca
- Class: Gastropoda
- Order: Nudibranchia
- Family: Discodorididae
- Genus: Discodoris
- Species: D. cebuensis

Binomial name
- Discodoris cebuensis Bergh, 1877

= Discodoris cebuensis =

Species of gastropod

Discodoris cebuensis is a species of sea slug or dorid nudibranch, a marine gastropod mollusk in the family Discodorididae.

== Distribution ==
Discodoris cebuensis is found in the waters of Indonesia, the Philippines, India, Israel, Australia, New Caledonia, Japan, Oman, Singapore, the Marshall Islands, Papua New Guinea, and Hawaii.
