= Paradoris mulciber =

Scientific classification
- Kingdom: Animalia
- Phylum: Mollusca
- Class: Gastropoda
- Order: Nudibranchia
- Family: Discodorididae
- Genus: Paradoris
- Species: P. mulciber

Binomial name
- Paradoris mulciber (Ev. Marcus, 1971)

Species of gastropod

Paradoris mulciber is a species of sea slug, a dorid nudibranch, shell-less marine opisthobranch gastropod mollusks in the family Discodorididae.
