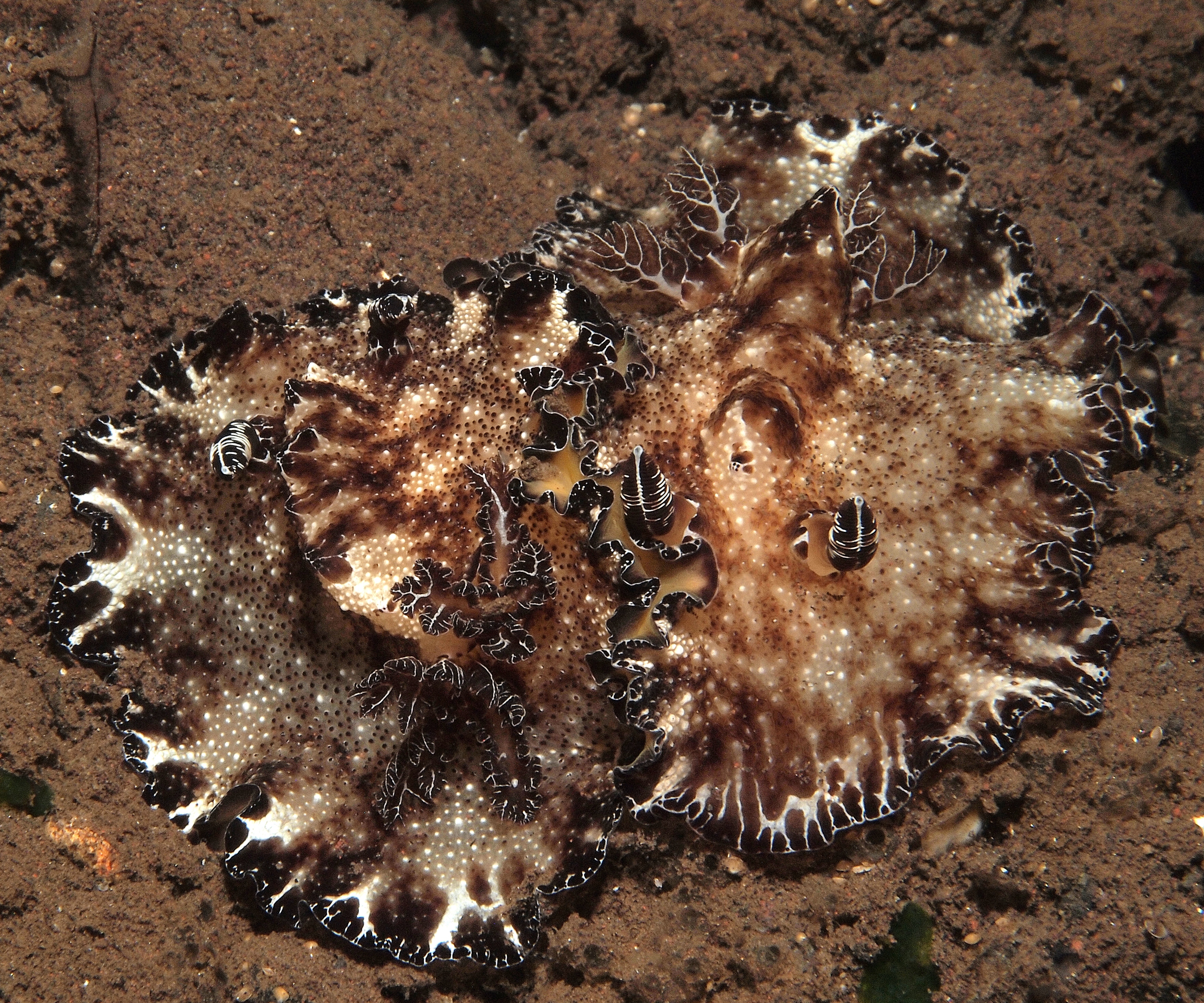
- Two individuals mating head to tail.

Scientific classification
- Kingdom: Animalia
- Phylum: Mollusca
- Class: Gastropoda
- Order: Nudibranchia
- Family: Discodorididae
- Genus: Discodoris
- Species: D. boholiensis

Binomial name
- Discodoris boholiensis Bergh, 1877

= Discodoris boholiensis =

Species of mollusc (sea slug)

Discodoris boholiensis, known commonly as the Bohol discodoris, is a species of sea slug in the family Discodorididae. It gets its name from the island of Bohol in the Philippines. Discodoris boholiensis has a distinctive pattern of chocolate brown and cream-white all over its flattened body and wavy-edged mantle. It reaches a length of 12 cm (5 in).

== Description ==
The body of Discodoris boholiensis is roughly oval-shaped, with a wavy margin, broad and rather flattened, up to 12 cm (5 in) long and 8 cm (3 in) wide. The head is not clearly demarcated from the body. The rhinophores are dark brown, with a vertical white line on the anterior surfaces, and are able to retract into their sheaths; these are also dark brown and have wavy margins. The dorsal surface of the sea slug has a thicker longitudinal ridge, the visceral hump, in the centre; it is translucent and whitish, with irregular brown patches and spots. There are six external gills, which can also be retracted, of which the hind two are divided into two branches; the gills are brown with a distinctive pattern of white lines. The edge of the mantle is undulating, leathery and semi-rigid, streaked in dark brown and creamy-white, beige or yellowish, and dotted with dark brown and white speckles. On the underside of the animal, the foot is long and oval, being much narrower than the mantle, and has a dark brown edge.

== Distribution and habitat ==
This species is widespread throughout the tropical waters of the Indo-Pacific region, from the eastern coasts of Africa and Madagascar to Japan, Papua New Guinea, New Caledonia and Australia. It occurs on reefs on both hard and soft substrates, among corals and under overhangs, at depths down to about 15 m (50 ft).

== Ecology ==
Discodoris boholiensis is nocturnal, spending the day in crevices, or other concealed locations, often with the mantle folded or contorted into strange shapes to make it fit. If caught in the open in daylight it will crawl rapidly across the sand, but when it moves about at night it does so much more slowly; this behaviour is known as photokinesis, although it is quite incapable of understanding why such a strategy might increase its chances of survival. If attacked or disturbed, it readily autotomises, losing parts of its mantle and later regenerating the lost tissues. It feeds mainly on sponges. Like other dorid nudibranchs, it is a hermaphrodite. The genital opening is located on the right of the animal near the side and two individuals adopt a head to tail position for mating. Sperm is exchanged through a channel and fertilization is internal. The eggs are laid in the form of an orange-brown spiral gelatinous ribbon, deposited on a horizontal or vertical surface, which swells as it absorbs water.
