= Discodoris aurila =

Scientific classification
- Kingdom: Animalia
- Phylum: Mollusca
- Class: Gastropoda
- Order: Nudibranchia
- Family: Discodorididae
- Genus: Discodoris
- Species: D. aurila

Binomial name
- Discodoris aurila Er. Marcus & Ev. Marcus, 1967

Synonyms
- Montereina aurila (Marcus & Marcus, 1967)

Species of gastropod

Discodoris aurila is a species of sea slug, a dorid nudibranch, shell-less marine gastropod mollusks in the family Discodorididae.

== Distribution ==
This species occurs on the Pacific Ocean coasts of Mexico, Panama and Costa Rica.

== Description ==
Discodoris aurila is a flattened dorid which moulds itself to the surface it is resting on. It is light grey in colour with diffuse brown patches and irregular white markings. The gills and rhinophores have a pink tinge. The maximum recorded length is 50 mm.
