= Discodoris sauvagei =

Scientific classification
- Kingdom: Animalia
- Phylum: Mollusca
- Class: Gastropoda
- Order: Nudibranchia
- Family: Discodorididae
- Genus: Discodoris
- Species: D. sauvagei

Binomial name
- Discodoris sauvagei (Rochebrune, 1881)

Synonyms
- Peltodoris sauvagei; Rochebrune, 1881

Species of gastropod

Discodoris sauvagei is a species of sea slug or dorid nudibranch, a marine gastropod mollusk in the family Discodorididae.

== Distribution ==
This species occurs off the Cape Verde islands.
