= Discodoris glabella =

Scientific classification
- Kingdom: Animalia
- Phylum: Mollusca
- Class: Gastropoda
- Order: Nudibranchia
- Family: Discodorididae
- Genus: Discodoris
- Species: D. glabella

Binomial name
- Discodoris glabella Bergh, 1907

Synonyms
- Doris glabella (Bergh, 1907)

Species of gastropod

Discodoris glabella is a species of sea slug, a dorid nudibranch, shell-less marine opisthobranch gastropod mollusks in the family Discodorididae.
