= Discodoris achroma =

Scientific classification
- Kingdom: Animalia
- Phylum: Mollusca
- Class: Gastropoda
- Order: Nudibranchia
- Family: Discodorididae
- Genus: Discodoris
- Species: D. achroma

Binomial name
- Discodoris achroma Valdés, 2001

Synonyms
- Montereina achroma (Valdés, 2001)

Species of gastropod

Discodoris achroma is a species of sea slug, a dorid nudibranch, shell-less marine opisthobranch gastropod mollusks in the family Discodorididae.

== Distribution ==
Discodoris achroma is found of the coasts of New Caledonia.
