= Paradoris adamsae =

Scientific classification
- Kingdom: Animalia
- Phylum: Mollusca
- Class: Gastropoda
- Order: Nudibranchia
- Family: Discodorididae
- Genus: Paradoris
- Species: P. adamsae

Binomial name
- Paradoris adamsae Padula & Valdés, 2012

Species of gastropod

Paradoris adamsae is a species of sea slug, a dorid nudibranch, shell-less marine opisthobranch gastropod mollusks in the family Discodorididae.
