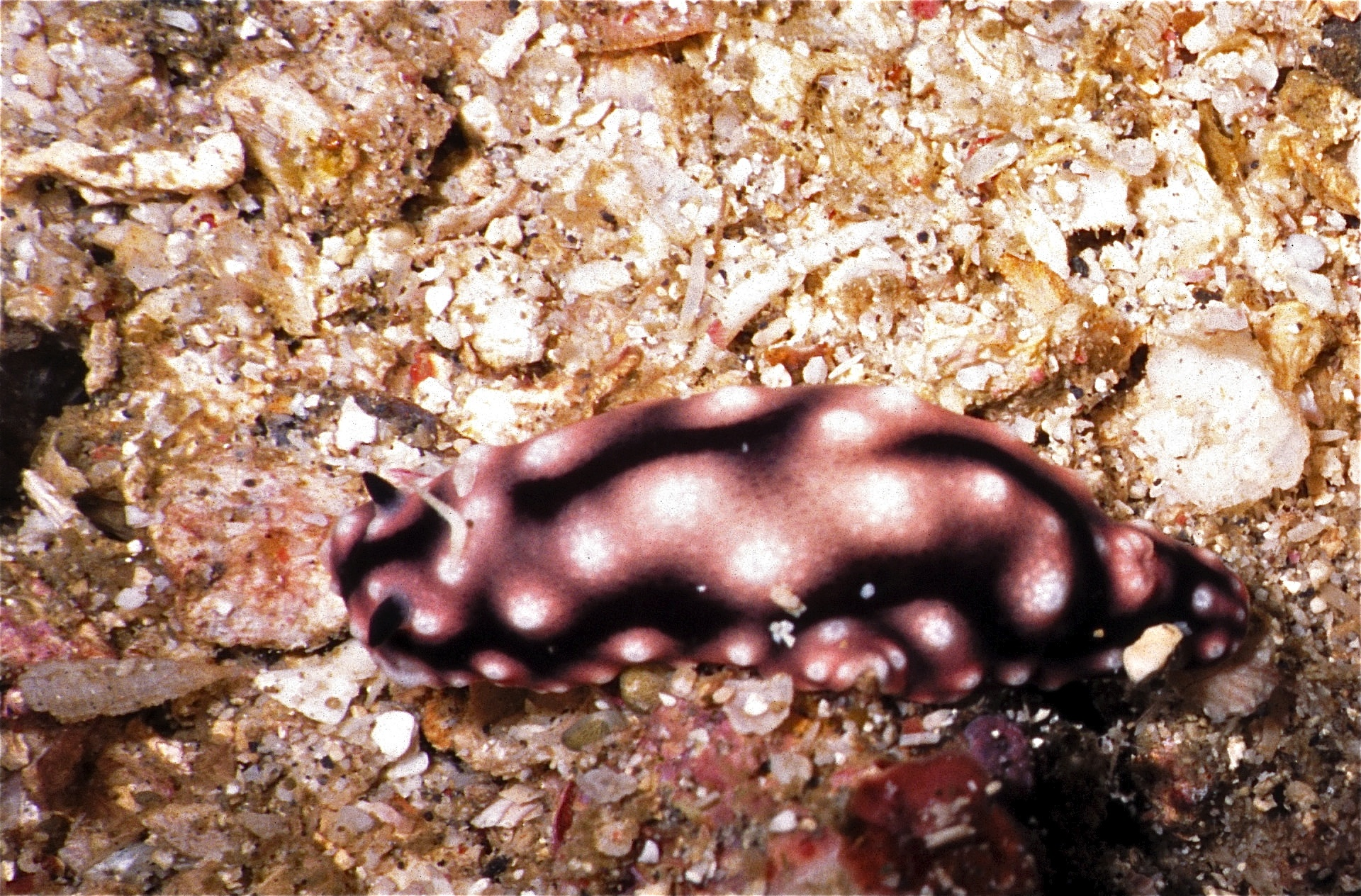

Scientific classification
- Kingdom: Animalia
- Phylum: Mollusca
- Class: Gastropoda
- Order: Nudibranchia
- Family: Discodorididae
- Genus: Paradoris
- Species: P. liturata

Binomial name
- Paradoris liturata Bergh, 1884

Synonyms
- Discodoris liturata Bergh, 1905

= Paradoris liturata =

Species of gastropod

Paradoris liturata is a species of sea slug, a dorid nudibranch, shell-less marine gastropod mollusk in the family Discodorididae.
