= Paradoris erythraeensis =

Scientific classification
- Kingdom: Animalia
- Phylum: Mollusca
- Class: Gastropoda
- Order: Nudibranchia
- Family: Discodorididae
- Genus: Paradoris
- Species: P. erythraeensis

Binomial name
- Paradoris erythraeensis (Vayssière, 1912)

Synonyms
- Discodoris erythraeensis Vayssière, 1912

Species of gastropod

Paradoris erythraeensis is a species of sea slug, a dorid nudibranch, shell-less marine opisthobranch gastropod mollusks in the family Discodorididae.

== Distribution ==
This species is known from the Red Sea.
