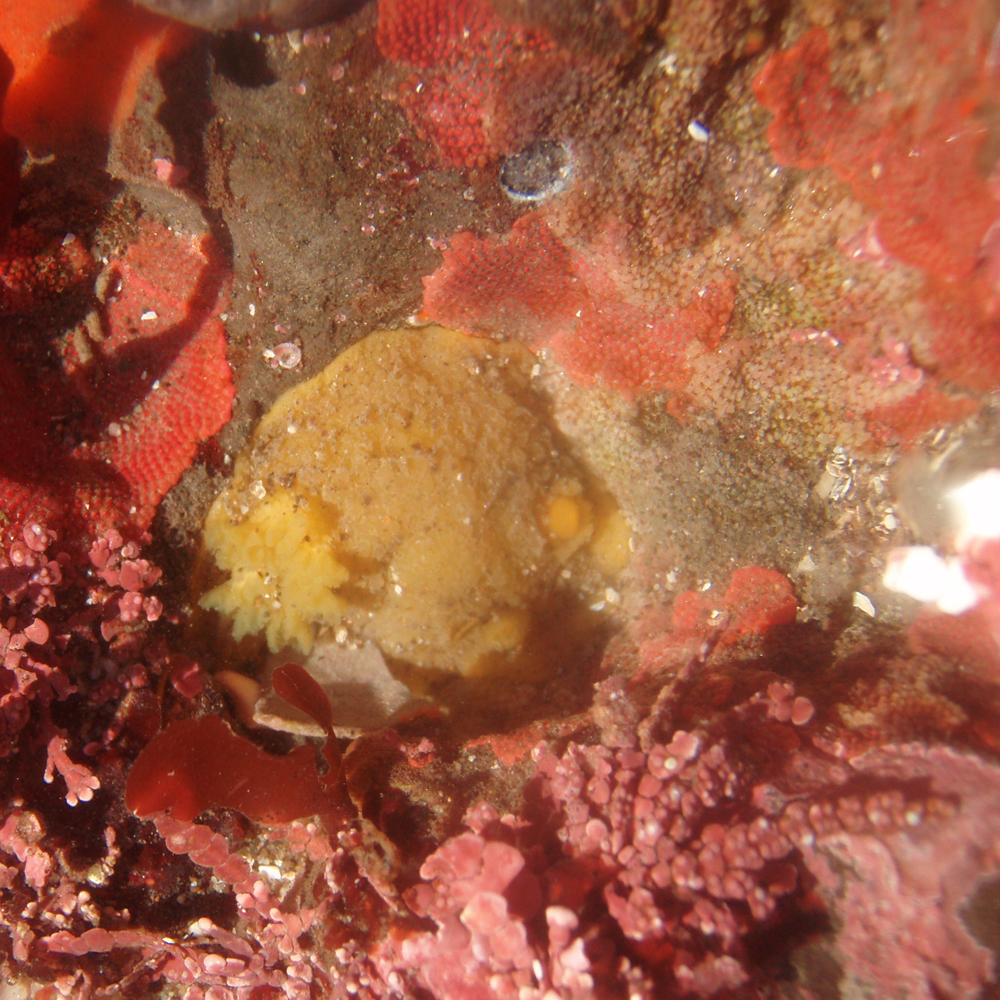
- Geitodoris heathi in a Central California tide pool, surrounded by red algae and bryozoans

Scientific classification
- Kingdom: Animalia
- Phylum: Mollusca
- Class: Gastropoda
- Order: Nudibranchia
- Family: Discodorididae
- Genus: Geitodoris
- Species: G. heathi

Binomial name
- Geitodoris heathi (MacFarland, 1905)

Synonyms
- Discodoris fulva O'Donoghue, 1924; Discodoris heathi MacFarland, 1905 (original combination)

= Geitodoris heathi =

Species of gastropod

Geitodoris heathi, common name "Heath's dorid", is a species of colorful sea slug, a dorid nudibranch, a shell-less marine gastropod mollusc in the family Dorididae.

== Distribution ==
This species of dorid nudibranch lives in the eastern Pacific, from Alaska to Baja California.

== Description ==
This nudibranch grows to be about 45 mm, or almost 2 inches in length. It can be white, yellow, or even a sort of pinkish color. It often sports small dark speckles that may appear as large brown patches to the naked eye. These dark speckles also often cause their gills to appear as a dusty colour, as well.

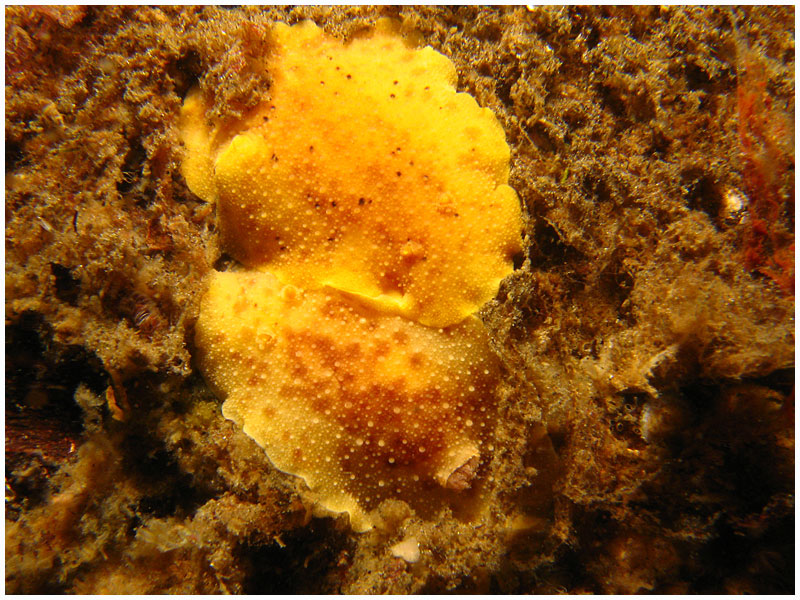
Geitodoris heathi, a mating pair

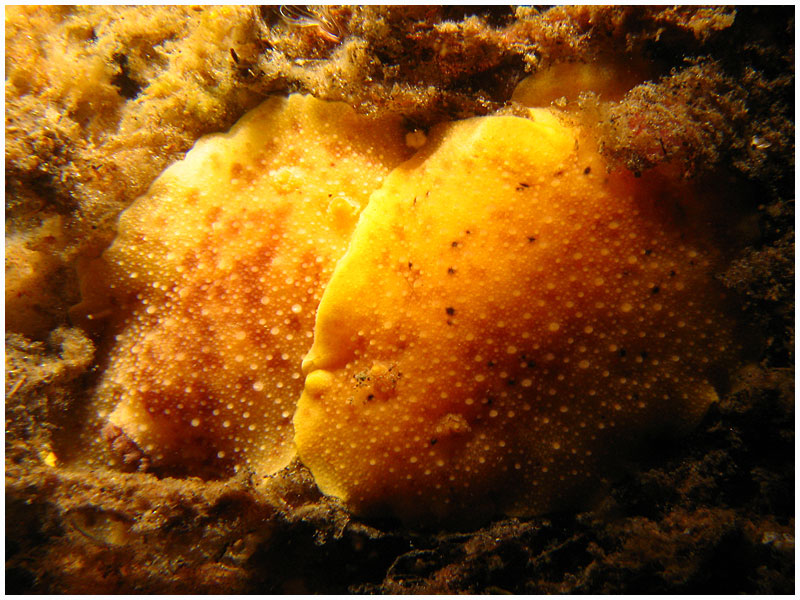
Geitodoris heathi

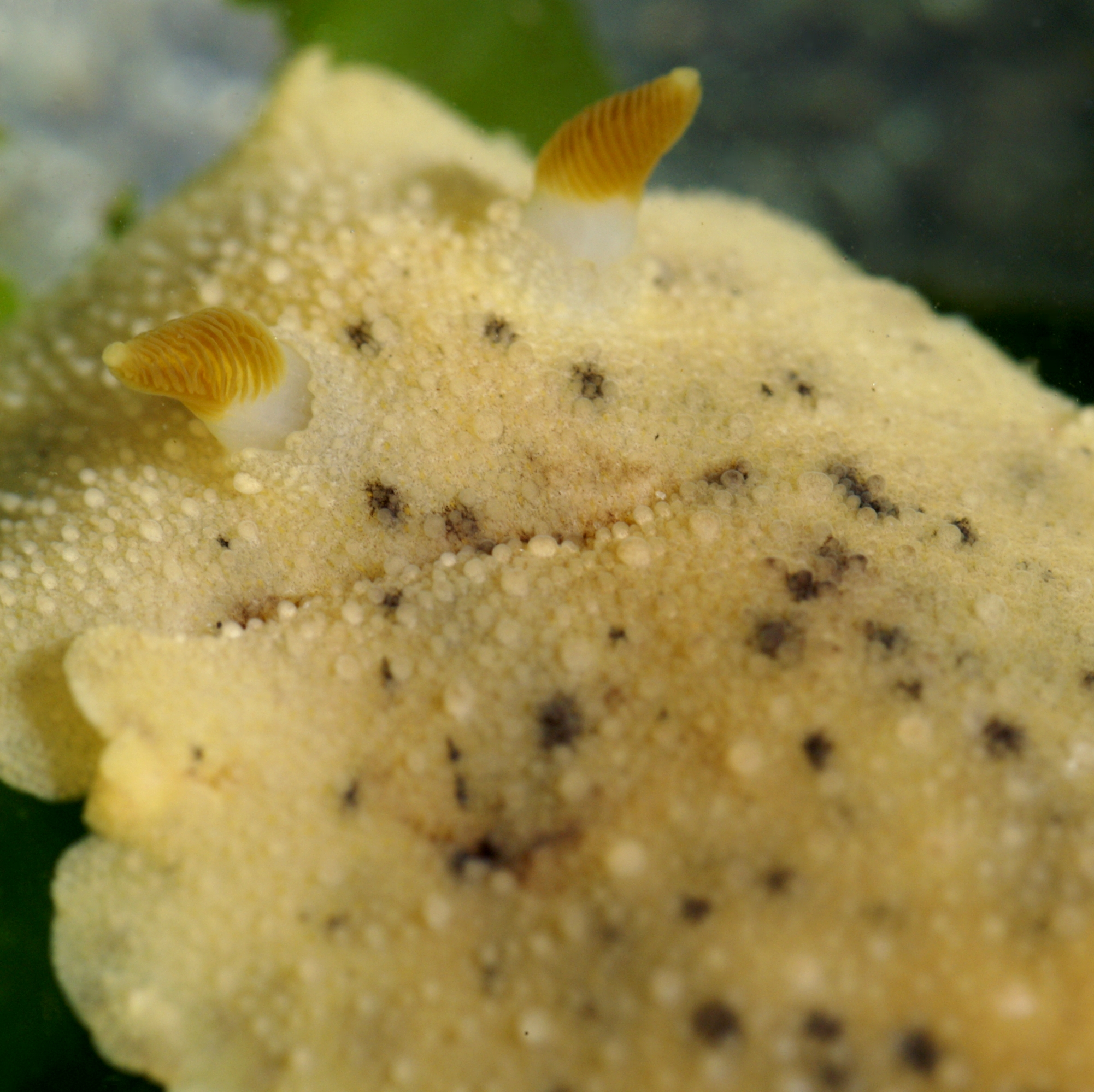
Geitodoris heathi

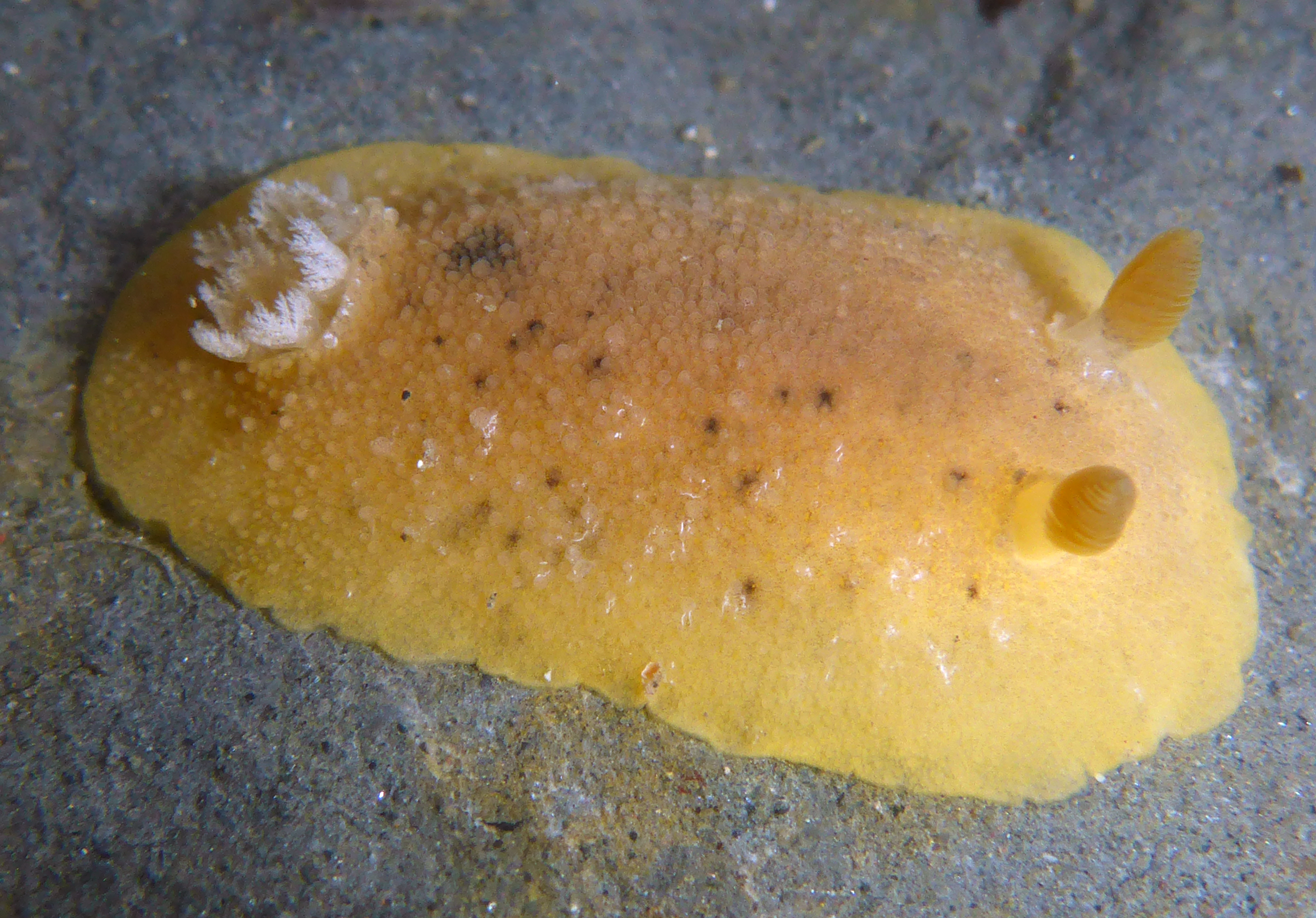
Geitodoris heathi from Pillar Point, California This nudibranch is often confused with the Monterey sea lemon and the noble sea lemon. The Monterey sea lemon generally grows larger and sports larger tubercles and dorsal spots than Heath's dorid and sea lemons generally lack the darker gill colouration seen in Heath's dorid. However, the variability between specimens of all three species makes identification significantly more difficult.

== Notes ==
=== References ===
- http://www.marinespecies.org/ search term Geitodoris accessed 4 March 2010

=== Books ===
- Behrens David W., 1980, Pacific Coast Nudibranchs: a guide to the opisthobranchs of the northeastern Pacific, Sea Challenger Books, California
