= Rostanga lutescens =

Scientific classification
- Kingdom: Animalia
- Phylum: Mollusca
- Class: Gastropoda
- Order: Nudibranchia
- Family: Discodorididae
- Genus: Rostanga
- Species: R. lutescens

Binomial name
- Rostanga lutescens (Bergh, 1905)

Species of gastropod

Rostanga lutescens, is a species of sea slug, a dorid nudibranch, a marine gastropod mollusc in the family Discodorididae.

== Distribution ==
This species was described from Timor, Indonesia. It has subsequently been reported from the Marshall Islands.

== Description ==
This dorid nudibranch is a pale, translucent orange or yellow in colour, and the dorsum is covered with caryophyllidia.

== Ecology ==
Most species of Rostanga feed on sponges of the family Microcionidae.
