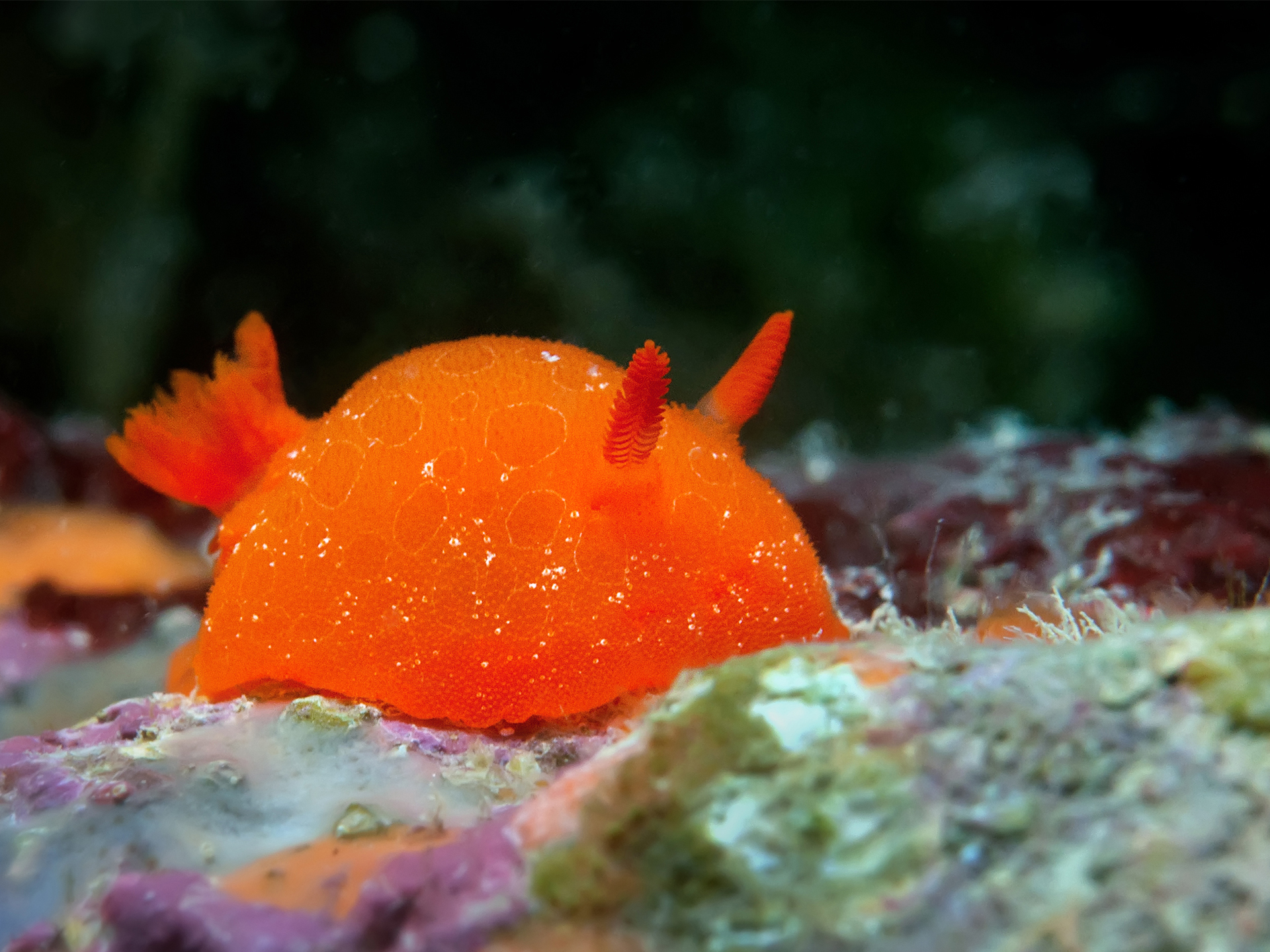

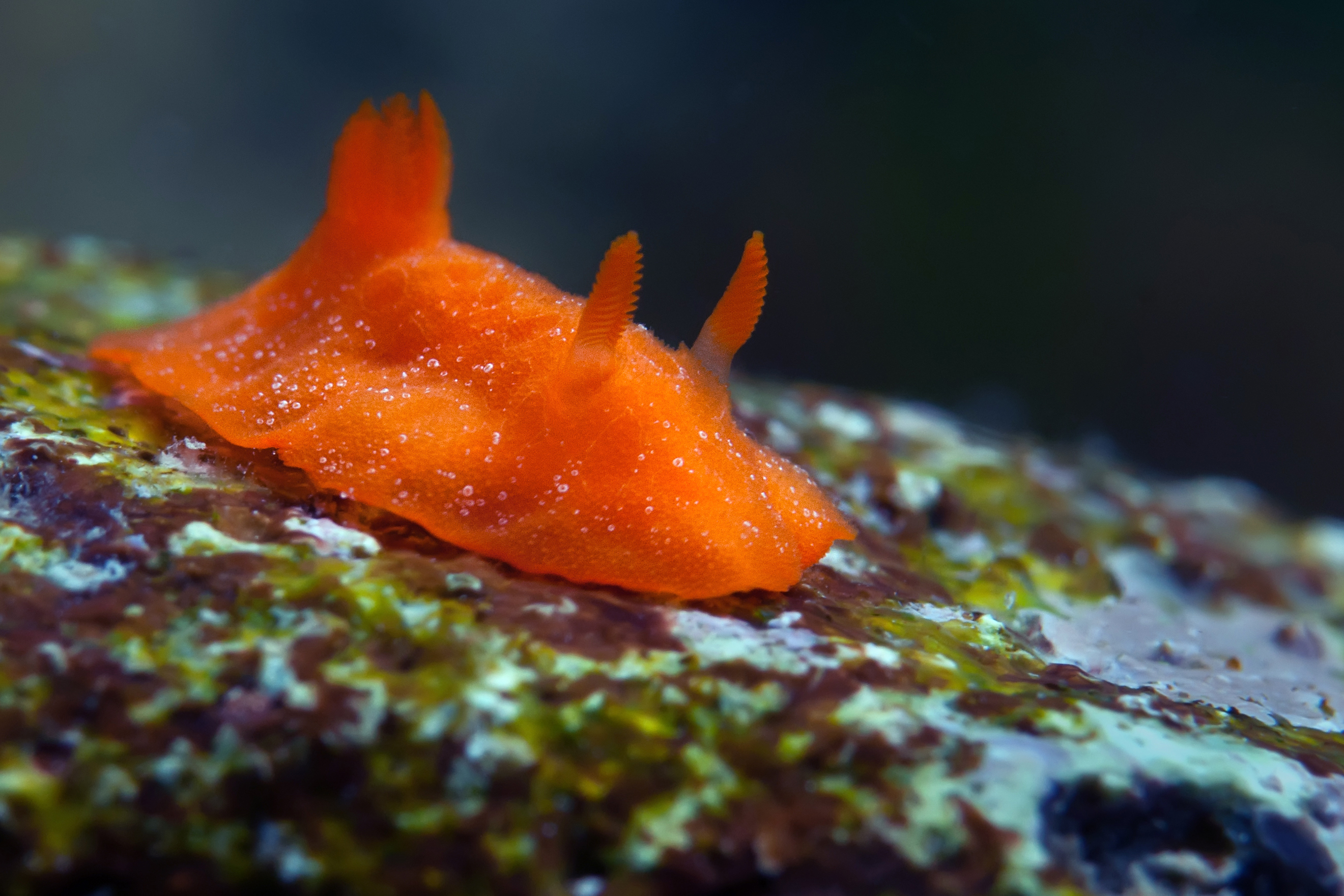

Scientific classification
- Kingdom: Animalia
- Phylum: Mollusca
- Class: Gastropoda
- Order: Nudibranchia
- Family: Discodorididae
- Genus: Discodoris
- Species: D. rosi

Binomial name
- Discodoris rosi Ortea, 1979

= Discodoris rosi =

Species of gastropod

Discodoris rosi is a species of sea slug, a dorid nudibranch, shell-less marine gastropod mollusks in the family Discodorididae.

== Distribution ==
Discodoris rosi is found off the coasts of Southwestern Britain, Western and Southern France, Northern Spain, and Western Portugal.
