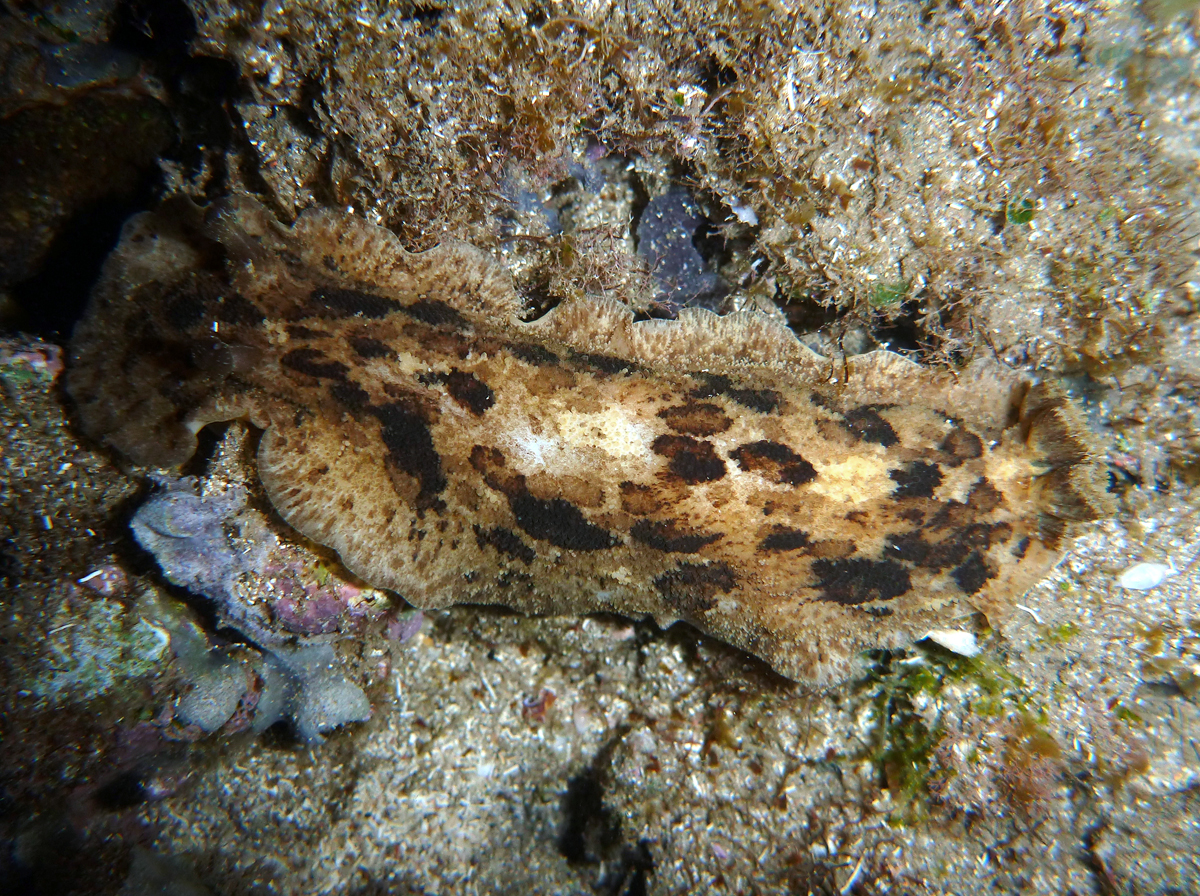

Scientific classification
- Kingdom: Animalia
- Phylum: Mollusca
- Class: Gastropoda
- Order: Nudibranchia
- Family: Discodorididae
- Genus: Sebadoris
- Species: S. fragilis

Binomial name
- Sebadoris fragilis (Alder & Hancock, 1864)

Synonyms
- Alloiodoris hedleyi O'Donoghue, 1924; Discodoris fragilis (Alder & Hancock, 1864) (recombination); Discodoris morphaea Bergh, 1877; Discodoris notiperda Risbec, 1956; Discodoris vanikoro Pruvot-Fol, 1934; Doris fragilis Alder & Hancock, 1864 (basionym); Doris granulata Ehrenberg, 1831 (Declared nomen oblitum under Art. 23.9 by Dayrat (2010)); Doris sordida Quoy & Gaimard, 1832 (Invalid: junior homonym of Doris sordida Rüppell & Leuckart, 1831; Doris sordidata is a replacement name); Doris sordidata Abraham, 1877; Doris stragulata Abraham, 1877

= Sebadoris fragilis =

Species of gastropod

Sebadoris fragilis is a species of sea slug, a dorid nudibranch, shell-less marine gastropod mollusc in the family Discodorididae.

== Distribution ==
This species occurs in European waters (Spain, Portugal) and in the Red Sea.
