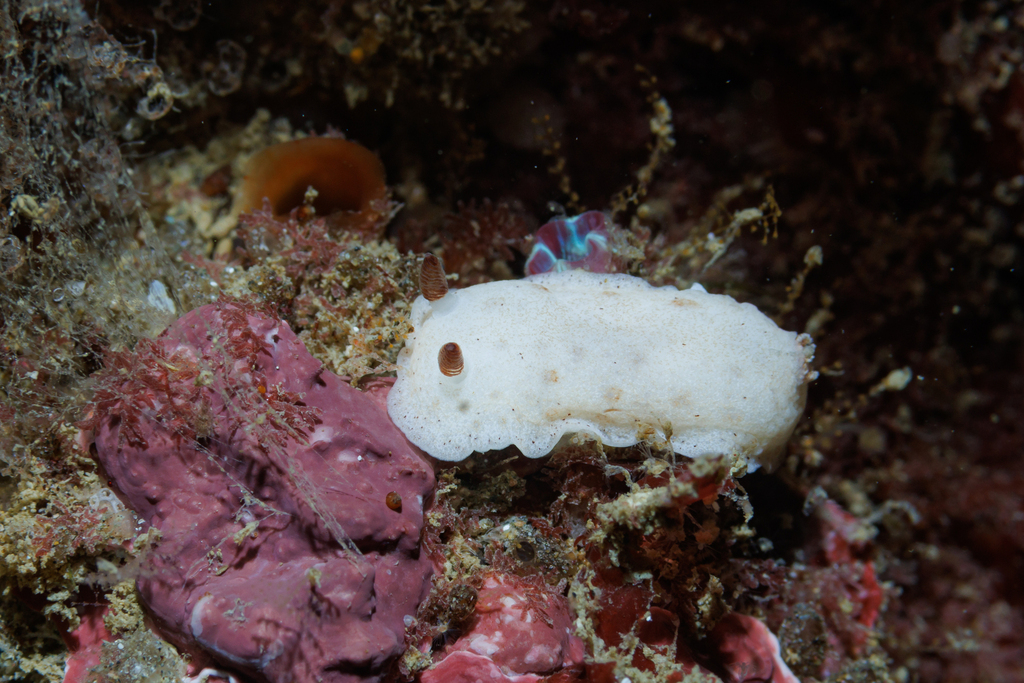

Scientific classification
- Kingdom: Animalia
- Phylum: Mollusca
- Class: Gastropoda
- Order: Nudibranchia
- Family: Discodorididae
- Genus: Paradoris
- Species: P. dubia

Binomial name
- Paradoris dubia (Bergh, 1904)

Synonyms
- Alloiodoris nivosus Burn, 1958; Discodoris dubia Bergh, 1904; Discodoris egena Bergh, 1904; Paradoris leuca M. C. Miller, 1995

= Paradoris dubia =

Species of gastropod

Paradoris dubia is a species of sea slug, a dorid nudibranch, shell-less marine opisthobranch gastropod mollusks in the family Discodorididae.

== Distribution ==
As a water-dwelling sea slug, Paradoris dubia can be found in waters around New South Wales, Tasmania, Victoria, and in the South Pacific Ocean surrounding Southern and Western Australia.
