= Rudolph Bergh =

Danish physician and malacologist (1824–1909)

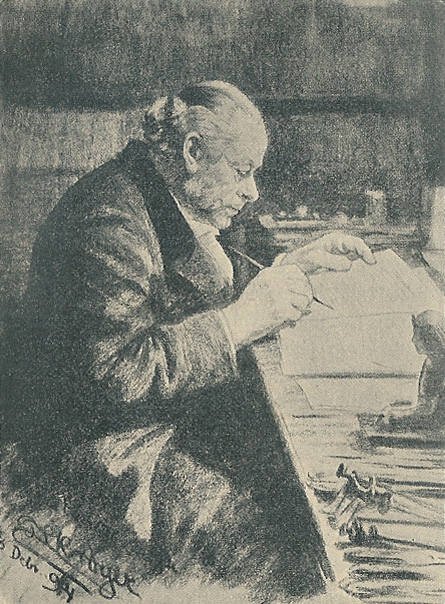
- Engraving by Peder Severin Krøyer, 1894
- Born: 15 October 1824; Copenhagen, Denmark
- Died: 20 July 1909 (aged 84); Copenhagen, Denmark
- Education: Det von Westenske Institut, Copenhagen
- Known for: Leading expert on nudibranchs; sexually transmitted diseases
- Children: At least one, Rudolph Sophus Bergh
- Parents: Ludvig Anton Berg (father); Anne Sophie Kirstine (Pedersen) (mother)
- Awards: Knighthood of the Third Class Order of Order of the Dannebrog; Dannebrogordenens Hæderstegn
- Scientific career
- Fields: medicine and malacology
- Workplaces: Almindeligt Hospital, Copenhagen; Vestre Hospital, Copenhagen

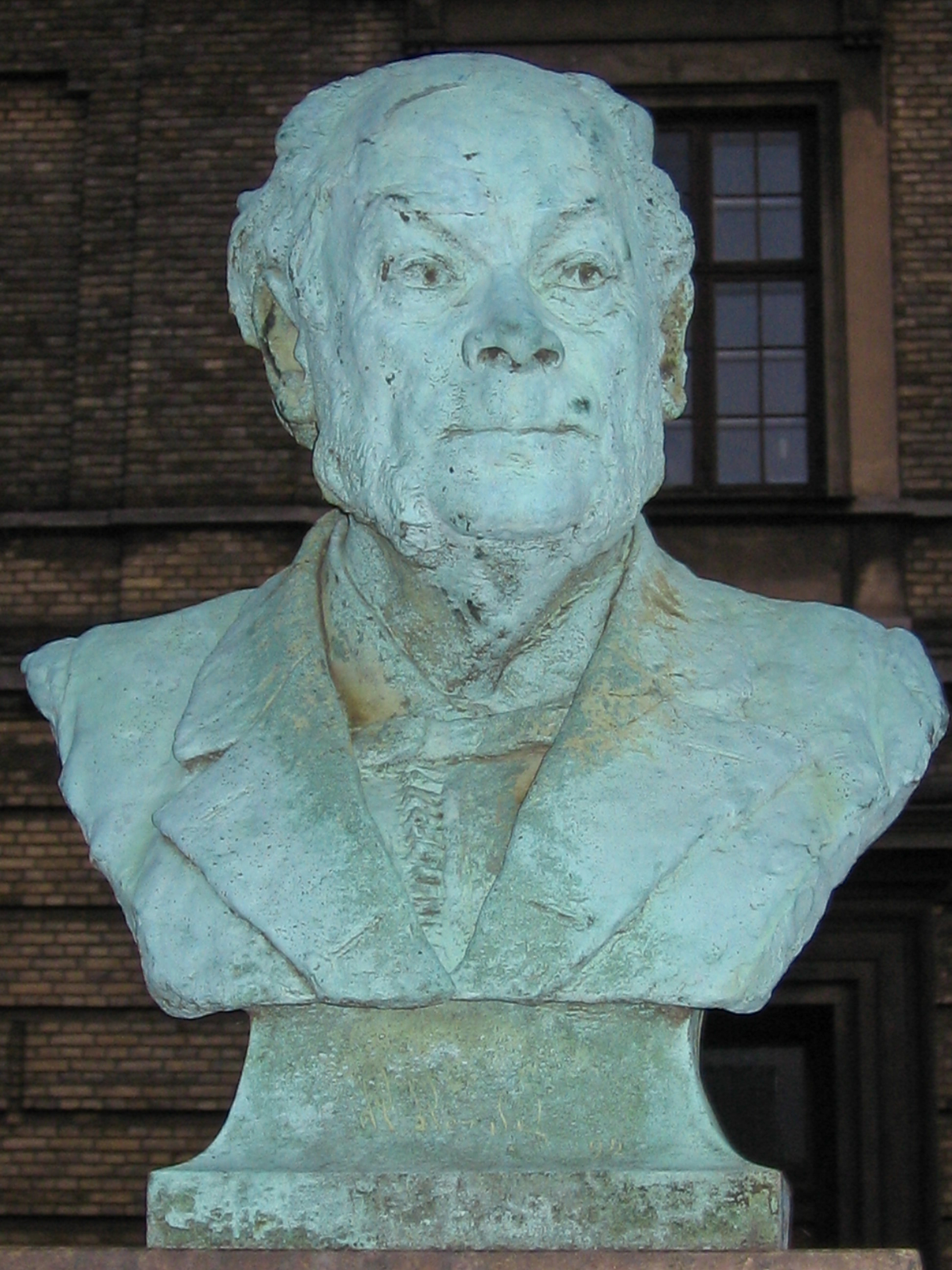
Bust of Rudolph Bergh made by Peder Severin Krøyer is in Copenhagen.

Rudolph Bergh (15 October 1824 – 20 July 1909), full name Ludvig Sophus Rudolph Bergh, was a Danish physician and malacologist. He worked in Copenhagen.

As a doctor his speciality was sexually transmitted diseases. In Copenhagen a hospital and a street are named after him.

Bergh was also an active malacologist, i.e. a zoologist who studies molluscs, in particular the nudibranchs, shell-less marine gastropods. He had well over 90 publications in this field and took part in a scientific expedition to Indonesia. He named and described numerous species of nudibranchs.

== Biography ==
Rudolph Bergh was born in Copenhagen. His father was chief physician in the army Ludvig Anton Berg (1793–1853). His mother was Anne Sophie Kirstine (maiden name Pedersen). Bergh graduated from the Det von Westenske Institut in 1842, and received his medical degree in 1849.

Dr. Rudolph Bergh became an attending physician at what was then Almindeligt Hospital, the general hospital in Amaliegade, Copenhagen, in 1863. He worked in the department of skin diseases and venereal diseases. In 1886, he moved from there to Vestre Hospital, where he worked until 1903.

Bergh died in 1909. One year after his death, Vestre Hospital was renamed Rudolph Bergh Hospital in honor of his memory. At that hospital, anyone who wished to could be tested for sexually transmitted diseases, and get advice on safe sex and birth control without any change and while retaining their anonymity. In 2000, some of these functions were transferred to Bispebjerg Hospital.

There is a bust of Bergh in Copenhagen, in front of the eponymous "Rudolph Bergh's Hospital", on Tietgensgade. The bust was a gift from his colleagues and stood for years in his home. After his death Bergh's widow donated it to the hospital.

Bergh was awarded a knighthood of the Third Class Order (Ridder af Dannebrog) of Order of the Dannebrog and also the Dannebrogordenens Hæderstegn (Cross of Honour of the Order of the Dannebrog).

In Copenhagen there is a street named in honor of him: Rudolph Berghs Gade (in English: Rudolph Bergh's Street) in Ydre Østerbro.

His son Rudolph Sophus Bergh (September 22, 1859 - December 7, 1924) was a zoologist and a composer.

== As a physician ==
His medical specialization was sexually transmitted diseases. Among the many texts that Rudolph Bergh wrote was About Tattoos in the public woman, which was published in the Hospital Journal in 1891. The work is about connections between prostitution, crime and tattoos. The article seems antiquated today and should not be taken as the sole expression of Rudolph Bergh great efforts to improve public health and in particular reduce the harmful effects of sexually transmitted diseases.

Bergh was also one of the editors of the hospital magazine Hospitalstidende, where he published nearly all of his over 50 medical articles.

- (in Danish) Bergh R. (1891). "Om Tatoveringer hos de offentlige Fruentimmer". (in English: About Tattoos in the public woman) Særtryk af "Hospitals-Tidende". Copenhagen.

== As a zoologist ==
Bergh started to study molluscs when he was nearly 30, probably under the influence of Japetus Steenstrup, a Danish biologist who was 11 years older than he was and who was a professor of zoology at the University of Copenhagen.

He wrote reports of the Challenger expedition (1884) and the Albatross expedition (1894). He took part in the examination of species that were collected during the "Siboga Expedition".

Bergh became the world's leading expert on nudibranchs. He wrote his main malacological works as well as over 90 malacological articles and papers. Among other notable works are his work about the anatomy of the radula of the genus Conus (1896). His malacological drawing are considered to be "excellent". He was mainly anatomist and reached great progress in systematics based on anatomy of nervous system and of reproductive system of gastropods.

== Taxa named by him ==
Bergh was very active in naming and describing species of nudibranchs and other sea slugs. The species he named include:

- Aphelodoris antillensis Bergh, 1879
- Aphelodoris brunnea Bergh, 1907
- Aphelodoris pallida (Bergh, 1905)
- Armina capensis (Bergh, 1907)
- Armina comta (Bergh, 1880)
- Armina cygnea (Bergh, 1876)
- Armina euchroa (Bergh, 1907)
- Armina loveni (Bergh, 1866)
- Armina microdonta (Bergh, 1907)
- Armina natalensis (Bergh, 1866)
- Armina semperi (Bergh, 1861)
- Armina taeniolata (Bergh, 1860)
- Armina variolosa (Bergh, 1904)
- Chromodoris albolimbata Bergh, 1907
- Chromodoris albonotata Bergh, 1875
- Chromodoris annae Bergh, 1877
- Chromodoris californiensis Bergh, 1879
- Chromodoris camoena Bergh, 1879
- Chromodoris cardinalis Bergh, 1880
- Chromodoris dalli (Bergh, 1879)
- Chromodoris elisabethina (Bergh, 1877)
- Chromodoris euelpis Bergh, 1907
- Chromodoris inopinata Bergh, 1905
- Chromodoris lapinigensis Bergh, 1879
- Chromodoris mariana Bergh, 1890
- Chromodoris marpessa Bergh, 1905
- Chromodoris morchii Bergh, 1879
- Chromodoris nodulosa Bergh, 1905
- Chromodoris ophthalmica Bergh, 1905
- Chromodoris pantharella Bergh, 1879
- Chromodoris papulosa Bergh, 1905
- Chromodoris paupera Bergh, 1877
- Chromodoris porcata Bergh, 1889
- Chromodoris punctilucens Bergh, 1890
- Chromodoris pustulans Bergh, 1877
- Chromodoris rudolphi Bergh, 1880
- Chromodoris striatella Bergh, 1877
- Chromodoris venusta Bergh, 1905
- Chromodoris virginea Bergh, 1877
- Discodoris boholiensis Bergh, 1877
- Discodoris cebuensis Bergh, 1877
- Discodoris coerulescens Bergh, 1888
- Discodoris erubescens Bergh, 1884
- Discodoris glabella (Bergh, 1907)
- Discodoris perplexa (Bergh, 1907)
- Discodoris pseudida (Bergh, 1907)
- Discodoris schmeltziana (Bergh, 1875)
- Discodoris tristis Bergh, 1899
- Doriopsilla areolata Bergh, 1880
- Doriopsilla capensis Bergh, 1907
- Doriopsilla pallida Bergh, 1902
- Doris bicolor (Bergh, 1884)
- Doris capensis (Bergh, 1907)
- Doris januarii (Bergh, 1878)
- Doris kerguelenensis (Bergh, 1884)
- Doris nanula (Bergh, 1904)
- Doris ocelligera (Bergh, 1881)
- Doris scripta (Bergh, 1907)
- Doris violacea (Bergh, 1904)
- Glaucus marginatus (Bergh, 1860) – Indo-Pacific
- Montereina modesta (Bergh, 1877)
- Montereina opisthidia (Bergh, 1877)
- Nembrotha cristata Bergh, 1877
- Nembrotha kubaryana Bergh, 1877
- Nembrotha lineolata Bergh, 1905
- Paradoris dubia (Bergh, 1904)
- Paradoris indecora (Bergh, 1881)
- Paradoris liturata (Bergh, 1905)
- Peltodoris atromaculata Bergh, 1880
- Phyllidia coelestis Bergh, 1905
- Phyllidia elegans Bergh, 1869
- Phyllidia rueppelii (Bergh, 1869)
- Phyllidiella rosans (Bergh, 1873)
- Phyllodesmium briareum (Bergh, 1896)
- Phyllodesmium longicirrum (Bergh, 1905)
- Roboastra gracilis (Bergh, 1877)
- Rostanga lutescens (Bergh, 1905)
- Tambja capensis (Bergh, 1907)
- Tambja diaphana (Bergh, 1877)
- Tambja gratiosa (Bergh, 1890)
- Tambja morosa (Bergh, 1877)
- Thuridilla lineolata Bergh, 1905
- Titiscania limacina Bergh, 1890
- Triopha modesta (Bergh, 1880)

Genus's he described:

- Titiscania Bergh, 1890

Familys he described"

- Titiscaniidae Bergh, 1890

== Taxon named in his honor ==
The nudibranch genus Berghia was named after him by Salvatore Trinchese in 1877.

== Colleagues ==
His colleague and friend was German ethnologist and animal ecologist Carl Semper.

== See also ==
- Paul Mayer (zoologist)
- Jean Paul Louis Pelseneer
- Mattheus Marinus Schepman
- Edgar Albert Smith

== Bibliography ==
- (in German) Bergh R. (1858). Beiträge zur Kenntniss der Coniden. Nova Acta der Ksl. Leop.-Carol. Deutschen Akademie der Naturforschen, Halle. Band 65, number 2, 214 pp., 13 tables.
- Bergh R. (1870). Malacologische Untersuchungen. In: C.G. Semper, Reisen im Archipel der Philippinen, Wissenschaftliche Resultate. Band 2, Heft 1: 1-30, Pls. 1–8.
- Bergh L. S. R. (1877). Malacologische Untersuchungen. In: Reisen im Archipel der Philippinen von Dr. Carl Gottfried Semper. Zweiter Theil. Wissenschaftliche Resultate. Band 2, Theil 2, Heft 11, pp. 429–494, pls. 54–57.
- Bergh L. S. R. (1879). Neue Chromodoriden. Malakozool. Blatt, N. E 1 : 87–116; pt. 3 (31 March 1879)
- Bergh L. S. R. (1879). On the nudibranchiate gasteropod Mollusca of the North Pacific Ocean, with special reference to those of Alaska. Part I. Proc. Acad. Nat Sci. Philadelphia 31: 71–132; pl. 1-8 (10 May 1879)
- Bergh L. S. R. (1879). On the nudibranchiate gasteropod Mollusca of the North Pacific Ocean, with special reference to those of Alaska. Part 1. Sci. Results Explor. Alaska 1: 127–188; pl. 9–16
- Bergh L. S. R. (1879). Gattungen nordische Doriden. Archiv für Naturgeschichte 45(1): 340–369, pl. 19.
- Bergh L. S. R. (1880). On the nudibranchiate gasteropod Mollusca of the North Pacific Ocean, with special reference to those of Alaska. Part 2. Sci. Results Explor. Alaska 2: 189–276; pl. 1-8 (10 May 1879)
- Bergh, L. S. R. (1881). Malacologische Untersuchungen. In: Reisen im Archipel der Philippinen von Dr. Carl Gottfried Semper. Zweiter Theil. Wissenschaftliche Resultate. Band 2, Theil 4, Heft 2, pp. 79–128, pls. G, H, J-L.
- Bergh, R. (1890). "Reports on the results of dredging, under the supervision of Alexander Agassiz, in the Gulf of Mexico (1877-78) and in the Caribbean Sea (1879-80), by the U. S. Coast Survey Steamer "Blake", Lieut.-Commander C. D. Sigsbee, U.S.N., and Commander J. R. Bartlett, U.S.N., commanding. Report on the nudibranchs". Bulletin of the Museum of Comparative Zoology 19(3): 155-181, 3 pls.
- Bergh, L. S. R. (1892). Malacologische Untersuchungen. In: Reisen im Archipel der Philippinen von Dr. Carl Gottfried Semper. Zweiter Theil. Wissenschaftliche Resultate. Band 2, Theil 3, Heft 18, pp. 995–1165.
- Bergh, R. (1898). Die Opisthobranchier der Sammlung Plate. Zoologische Jahrbücher, Supplement 4(3): 481–582, pl. 28–33.
- Bergh, R. (1905). Die Opisthobranchia. Siboga Expedition Monograph 50: 1–248. Plates 1-20.
- Bergh, R. (1908). The Opisthobranchiata of South Africa. Marine investigations in South Africa. Cape Town. 5: 1-144. including 14 plates. (From the Transactions of the South African Philosophical Society 12.)
