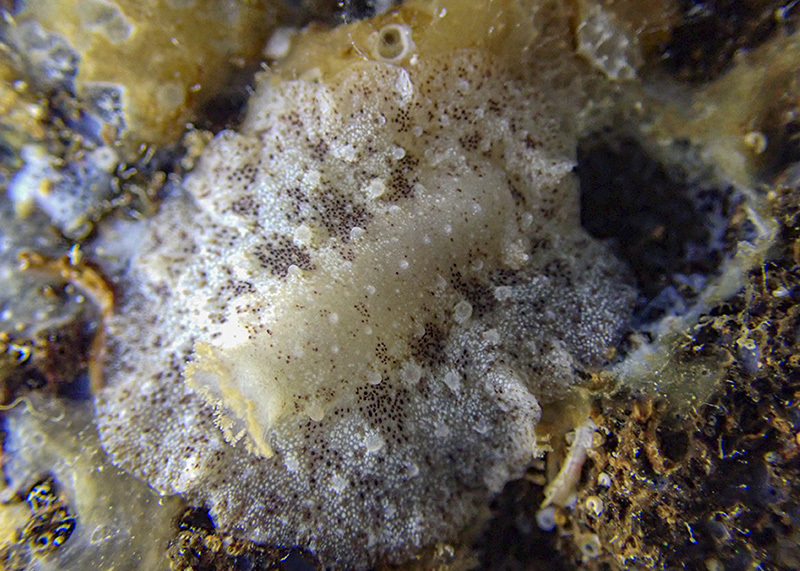

Scientific classification
- Kingdom: Animalia
- Phylum: Mollusca
- Class: Gastropoda
- Order: Nudibranchia
- Family: Discodorididae
- Genus: Paradoris
- Species: P. indecora

Binomial name
- Paradoris indecora (Bergh, 1881)

Synonyms
- Discodoris cavernae Starmühlner, 1955; Discodoris indecora Bergh, 1881 (basionym); Discodoris porri (Vérany, 1846)

= Paradoris indecora =

Species of gastropod

Paradoris indecora is a species of sea slug, a dorid nudibranch, shell-less marine gastropod mollusks in the family Discodorididae.

== Distribution ==
This species occurs in the Northeast Atlantic Ocean, the Mediterranean Sea, and in the Atlantic Ocean along the Cape Verde Islands.
