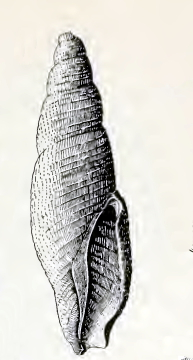
- Austropusilla hilum

Scientific classification
- Kingdom: Animalia
- Phylum: Mollusca
- Class: Gastropoda
- Subclass: Caenogastropoda
- Order: Neogastropoda
- Superfamily: Conoidea
- Family: Raphitomidae
- Genus: Austropusilla; Laseron, 1954

Type species
- Mangelia hilum Hedley, 1908

Species
- See text

= Austropusilla =

Genus of gastropods

Austropusilla is a genus of sea snails, marine gastropod mollusks in the family Raphitomidae.

== Distribution ==
This marine genus used to be endemic to Australia and occurs off New South Wales, Tasmania and Victoria. A. simoniana occurs off the Cape Province, South Africa.

== Species ==
Species within the genus Austropusilla include:

- Austropusilla hilum (Hedley, 1908)
- Austropusilla profundis Laseron, 1954
- Austropusilla simoniana Kilburn, 1974

Synonyms

- subgenus Austropusilla (Metaclathurella) Shuto, 1983: synonym of Otitoma Jousseaume, 1898
- Austropusilla crokerensis Shuto, 1983: synonym of Otitoma crokerensis (Shuto, 1983) (original combination)
