= Truncaria =

Scientific classification
- Kingdom: Animalia
- Phylum: Mollusca
- Class: Gastropoda
- Subclass: Caenogastropoda
- Order: Neogastropoda
- Superfamily: Buccinoidea
- Family: Buccinidae
- Genus: Truncaria; A. Adams & Reeve, 1850

Type species
- Buccinum filosum A. Adams & Reeve, 1850

Synonyms
- † Truncaria (Coptaxis) Cossmann, 1901

Genus of gastropods

Truncaria is a genus of sea snails, marine gastropod molluscs in the family Buccinidae, the true whelks.

== Description ==
The shell is acuminately oblong and thick. The suture of the spire is channelled . The aperture is anteriorly dilated, posteriorly subemarginated. The columella is arcuated, abruptly truncated in front, with a single anterior fold.

== Species ==
- † Truncaria benjamini Schnetler & M. S. Nielsen, 2018
- Truncaria filosa (A. Adams & Reeve, 1850)
- Truncaria lindae Petuch, 1987
- † Truncaria truncata (Deshayes, 1835)

Synonyms

- Truncaria australis Angas, 1877: synonym of Aesopus australis (Angas, 1877) (original combination)
- Truncaria eurytoides P. P. Carpenter, 1864: synonym of Aesopus eurytoides (P. P. Carpenter, 1864) (original combination)
- † Truncaria insolita Deshayes, 1865: synonym of † Litiopa insolita (Deshayes, 1865) (superseded combination)
