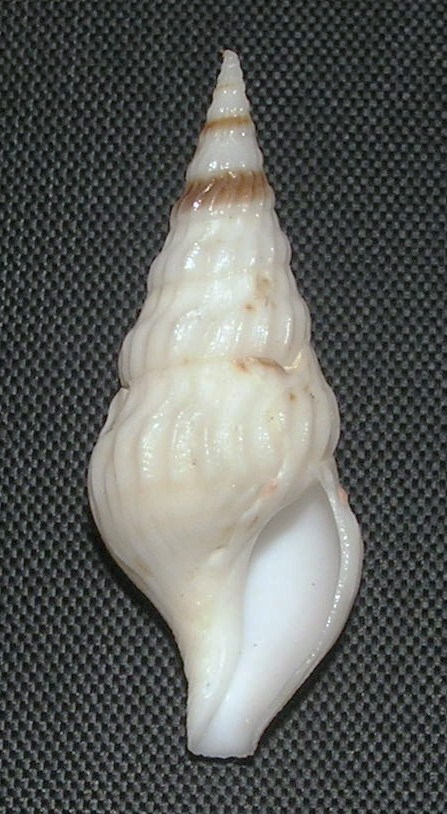
- Apertural view of a shell of Drillia maculomarginata

Scientific classification
- Kingdom: Animalia
- Phylum: Mollusca
- Class: Gastropoda
- Subclass: Caenogastropoda
- Order: Neogastropoda
- Superfamily: Conoidea
- Family: Drilliidae
- Genus: Drillia
- Species: D. maculomarginata

Binomial name
- Drillia maculomarginata Kilburn & Stahlschmidt, 2012

= Drillia maculomarginata =

Species of gastropod

Drillia maculomarginata is a species of sea snail, a marine gastropod mollusc in the family Drilliidae.

== Description ==
The length of the shell of this marine species attains 42 mm, while its width attains 9 mm.

Its whorls are convex and rounded. It is light yellow with splotches of dark brown, and a faint brownish band around the middle of the last whorl. Its protoconch is conical, containing 2 whorls.

== Distribution ==
This species occurs off the Aliguay Island, the Philippines.
