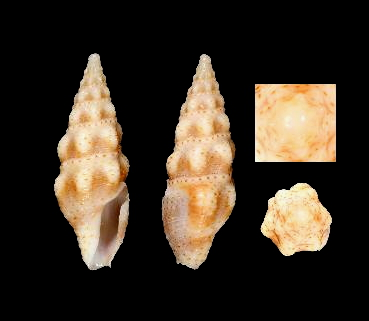
- Shells of Crassispira pulchrepunctata (paratype in MNHN, Paris)

Scientific classification
- Kingdom: Animalia
- Phylum: Mollusca
- Class: Gastropoda
- Subclass: Caenogastropoda
- Order: Neogastropoda
- Superfamily: Conoidea
- Family: Pseudomelatomidae
- Genus: Crassispira
- Species: C. pulchrepunctata

Binomial name
- Crassispira pulchrepunctata Stahlschmidt & Bozzetti, 2007

= Crassispira pulchrepunctata =

Species of gastropod

Crassispira pulchrepunctata is a species of sea snail, a marine gastropod mollusk in the family Pseudomelatomidae.

== Description ==
The length of the shell varies between 14 mm and 20 mm.

== Distribution ==
This marine species occurs off Aliguay Island, Dipolog, Mindanao, Philippines.
