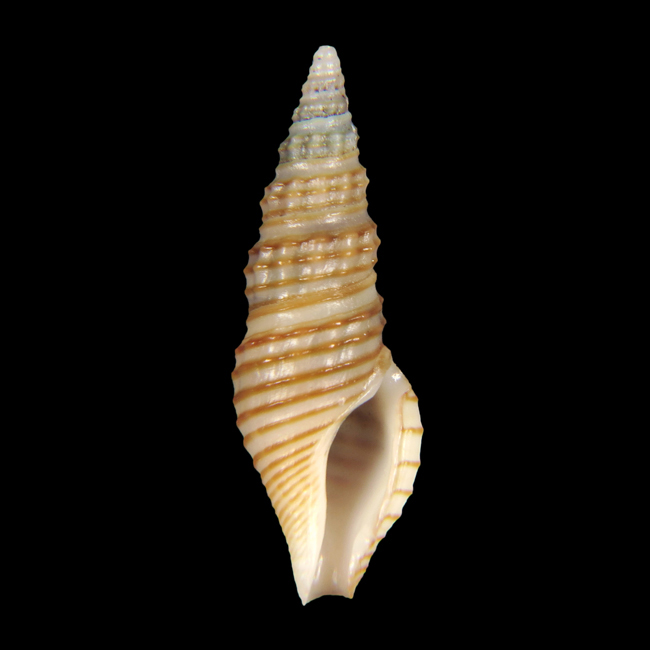

Scientific classification
- Kingdom: Animalia
- Phylum: Mollusca
- Class: Gastropoda
- Subclass: Caenogastropoda
- Order: Neogastropoda
- Superfamily: Conoidea
- Family: Pseudomelatomidae
- Genus: Otitoma
- Species: O. aureolineata

Binomial name
- Otitoma aureolineata Stahlschmidt, Poppe & Tagaro, 2018

= Otitoma aureolineata =

Species of gastropod

Otitoma aureolineata is a species of sea snail. It is a marine gastropod mollusc in the family Pseudomelatomidae.

== Description ==
The length of the shell varies between 15 mm and 19 mm.

== Distribution ==
This marine species occurs off Aliguay Island, Dipolog, Mindanao; Philippines.
