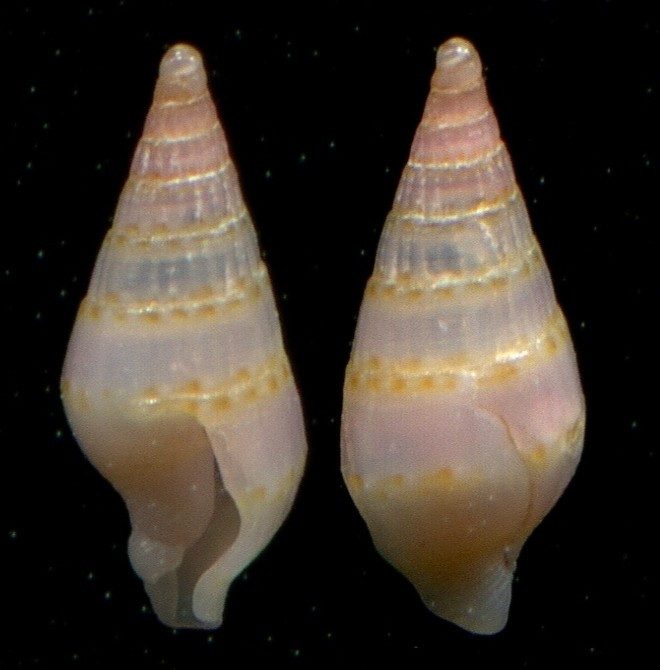
- Shell of Aesopus cumingii

Scientific classification
- Kingdom: Animalia
- Phylum: Mollusca
- Class: Gastropoda
- Subclass: Caenogastropoda
- Order: Neogastropoda
- Family: Columbellidae
- Genus: Aesopus
- Species: A. cumingii

Binomial name
- Aesopus cumingii (Reeve, 1859)

Synonyms
- Columbella cumingii Reeve, 1859 (original combination); Lavesopus cumingii (Reeve, 1859)

= Aesopus cumingii =

Species of gastropod

Aesopus cumingii, common name Cuming's columbella, is a species of sea snail, a marine gastropod mollusk in the family Columbellidae, the dove snails.

The variety Aesopus cumingii var. queenslandica Hedley, 1913is a synonym of Aesopus clausiliformis (Kiener, 1834)

== Description ==
(Original description) The shell is elongated and subcylindrical, with a recurved base. The spire is highly extended and minutely ribbed near the apex. The whorls are narrow and flatly convex, featuring spiral groove striations. The coloration is purple-violet, adorned with two encircling bands of red dots. The aperture is small and short, notched at the upper part, with a rather thickened and denticulated lip.

== Distribution ==
This marine species occurs off the Philippines, Indonesia, Papua New Guinea, Vanuatu, Japan; Mauritius, Bermuda Islands.
