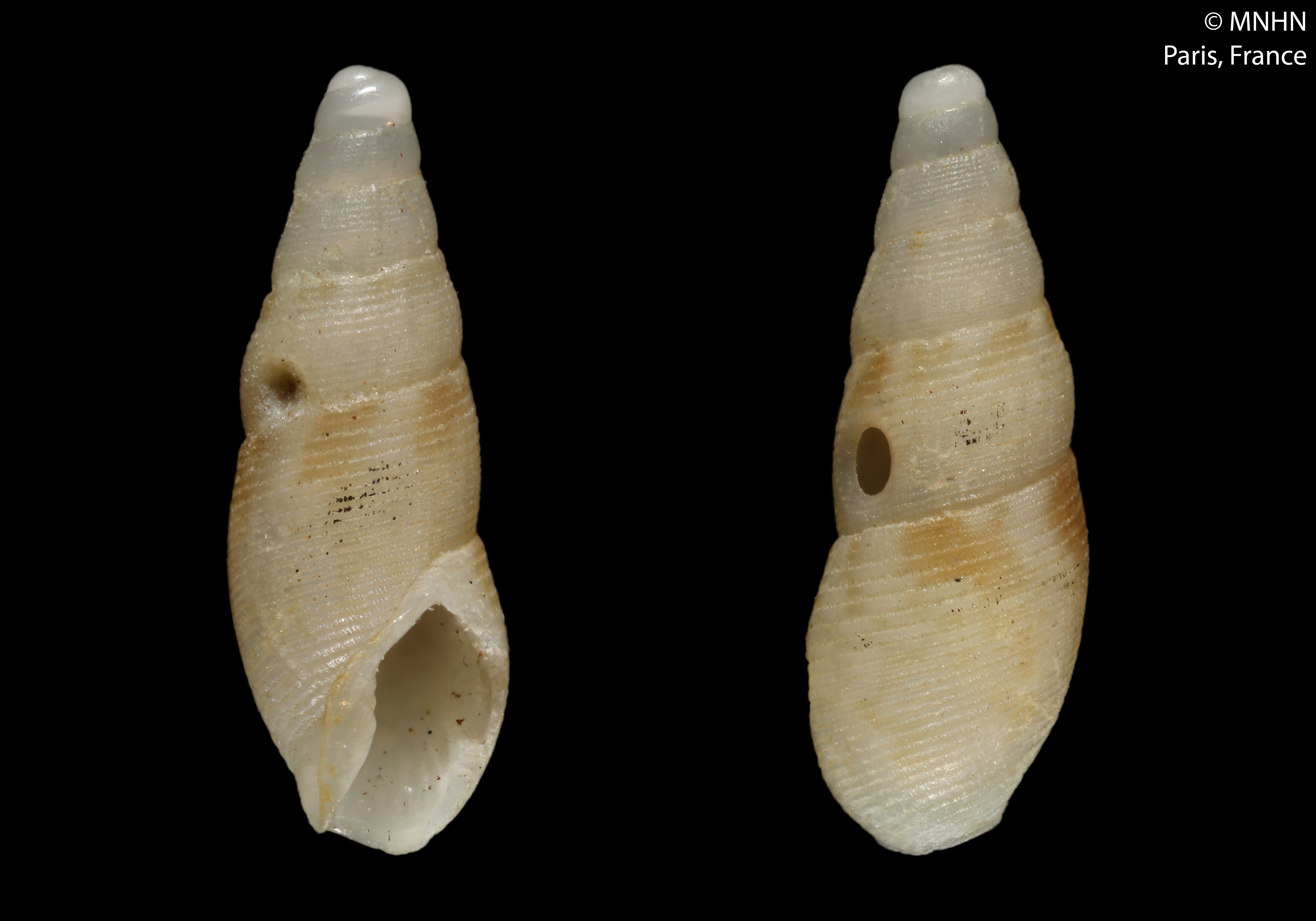
- Holotype of Aesopus guyanensis (at MNHN, Paris)

Scientific classification
- Kingdom: Animalia
- Phylum: Mollusca
- Class: Gastropoda
- Subclass: Caenogastropoda
- Order: Neogastropoda
- Superfamily: Buccinoidea
- Family: Columbellidae
- Genus: Aesopus; Gould, 1860

Type species
- Aesopus japonicus Gould, 1860

Species
- See text

Synonyms
- Aesopus (Lavesopus) Iredale, 1929· accepted, alternate representation

= Aesopus (gastropod) =

Genus of gastropods

Aesopus is a genus of sea snails, marine gastropod mollusks in the family Columbellidae, the dove snails.

== Description ==
(Original description in Latin) The animal is white with a sole that is emarginate anteriorly and obtuse posteriorly, featuring a flabelliform horny cover. It has a small head with external medial eyes and a wide, very short siphon.

The shell is fusiform and humpbacked, with a widely truncated anterior. The lunate aperture has its posterior corner filled with callus. The columella is simple and vitreous, while the suture near the aperture is abnormally arched.

The backward angle and downward curvature of the body whorl are quite peculiar. The form and appearance of the shell, along with the structure of the animal, suggest that it occupies an intermediate position between the genera Mitra and Columbella.

== Species ==
Species within the genus Aesopus include:

- Aesopus algoensis (G.B. Sowerby III, 1892)
- Aesopus aliciae Marincovich, 1973
- Aesopus australis (Angas, 1877)
- Aesopus benitoensis de Maintenon, 2019
- Aesopus cassandra (Hedley, 1904)
- Aesopus chrysalloideus (Carpenter, 1866)
- Aesopus clausiliformis (Kiener, 1834)
- Aesopus cumingii (Reeve, 1859)
- † Aesopus eniwetokensis (Ladd, 1977)
- Aesopus eurytoides (Carpenter, 1864)
- Aesopus foucheae Lussi, 2017
- Aesopus fredbakeri Pilsbry & Lowe, 1932
- Aesopus fuscostrigatus (Carpenter, 1864)
- Aesopus geraldsmithi Lussi M., 2001
- Aesopus goforthi Dall, 1912 (taxon inquirendum)
- Aesopus gracilis Faber, 2004
- Aesopus guyanensis Pelorce, 2017
- Aesopus jaffaensis (Verco, 1910)
- Aesopus japonicus Gould, 1860
- Aesopus meta (Thiele, 1925)
- Aesopus multistriatus (Preston, 1905)
- Aesopus myrmecoon Dall, 1916
- Aesopus obesus (Hinds, 1844)
- Aesopus pallidulus (Hedley, 1906)
- Aesopus plurisulcatus Reeve, 1859
- Aesopus rotundus Drivas & Jay, 1990
- Aesopus sanctus Dall, 1919
- Aesopus solidus (May, 1911)
- Aesopus stearnsii (Tryon, 1883)
- Aesopus urania Melvill & Standen, 1901
- Aesopus veneris (Thiele, 1925)

Species brought into synonymy

- Aesopus angustus (G.B. Sowerby III, 1886): synonym of Clathranachis angusta (G.B. Sowerby III, 1886)
- Aesopus arestus Dall, 1919: synonym of Ithiaesopus arestus (Dall, 1919) (original combination)
- † Aesopus crebricostatus Tenison Woods, 1879: synonym of Anachis (Turricolumbus) crebricostata (Tenison Woods, 1879) represented as † Anachis crebricostata (Tenison Woods, 1879)
- Aesopus eurytoideus (Carpenter, 1864): synonym of Aesopus eurytoides (Carpenter, 1864)
- Aesopus filosus Angas, 1867: synonym of Aesopus plurisulcatus Reeve, 1859
- Aesopus hilium Hedley, 1908: synonym of Austropusilla hilum (Hedley, 1908) (superseded combination)
- † Aesopus idae Bartsch, 1918: synonym of Aesopus chrysalloideus (P. P. Carpenter, 1864)
- Aesopus metcalfei (Reeve, 1858): synonym of Aesopus obesus (Hinds, 1844)
- Aesopus metella (Thiele, 1925): synonym of Decipifus metellus (Thiele, 1925)
- Aesopus osborni Hertlein & Strong, 1951: synonym of Exaesopus osborni (Hertlein & A. M. Strong, 1951) (original combination)
- † Aesopus semicostatus Tenison Woods, 1879: synonym of † Retizafra semicostata (Tenison Woods, 1879)
- Aesopus spiculus (Duclos in Chenu, 1846): synonym of Aesopus clausiliformis (Kiener, 1834)
- Aesopus subturritus (Carpenter, 1866): synonym of Exaesopus subturritus (P. P. Carpenter, 1864)
- Aesopus xenicus Pilsbry & Lowe, 1932: synonym of Glyptaesopus xenicus (Pilsbry & H. N. Lowe, 1932) (original combination)
