= Aesopus myrmecoon =

Scientific classification
- Kingdom: Animalia
- Phylum: Mollusca
- Class: Gastropoda
- Subclass: Caenogastropoda
- Order: Neogastropoda
- Family: Columbellidae
- Genus: Aesopus
- Species: A. myrmecoon

Binomial name
- Aesopus myrmecoon Dall, 1916
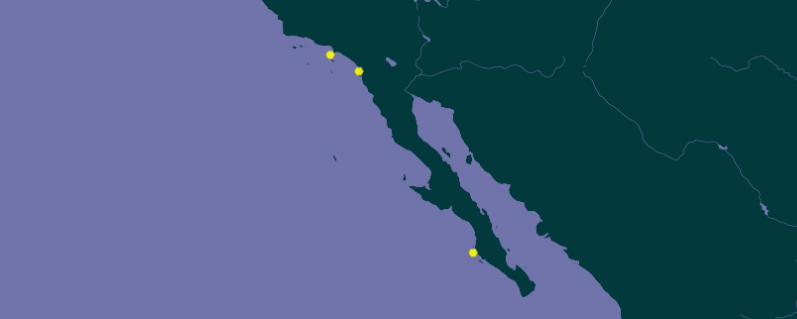

Synonyms
- Columbella stearnsii Tryon, 1883

Species of gastropod

Aesopus myrmecoon, common name ant-egg dovesnail, is a species of sea snail, a marine gastropod mollusk in the family Columbellidae, the dove snails.

== Description ==
(Original description) This is a minute species four millimeters long, of a whitish color more or less tinged or spotted with brown, almost duplicates Aesopus stearnsii (Tryon, 1883) in form and sculpture, though so much smaller than the Florida species.

== Distribution ==
This marine species occurs off San Pedro, California, USA to Point Abreojos, Baja California, Mexico.
