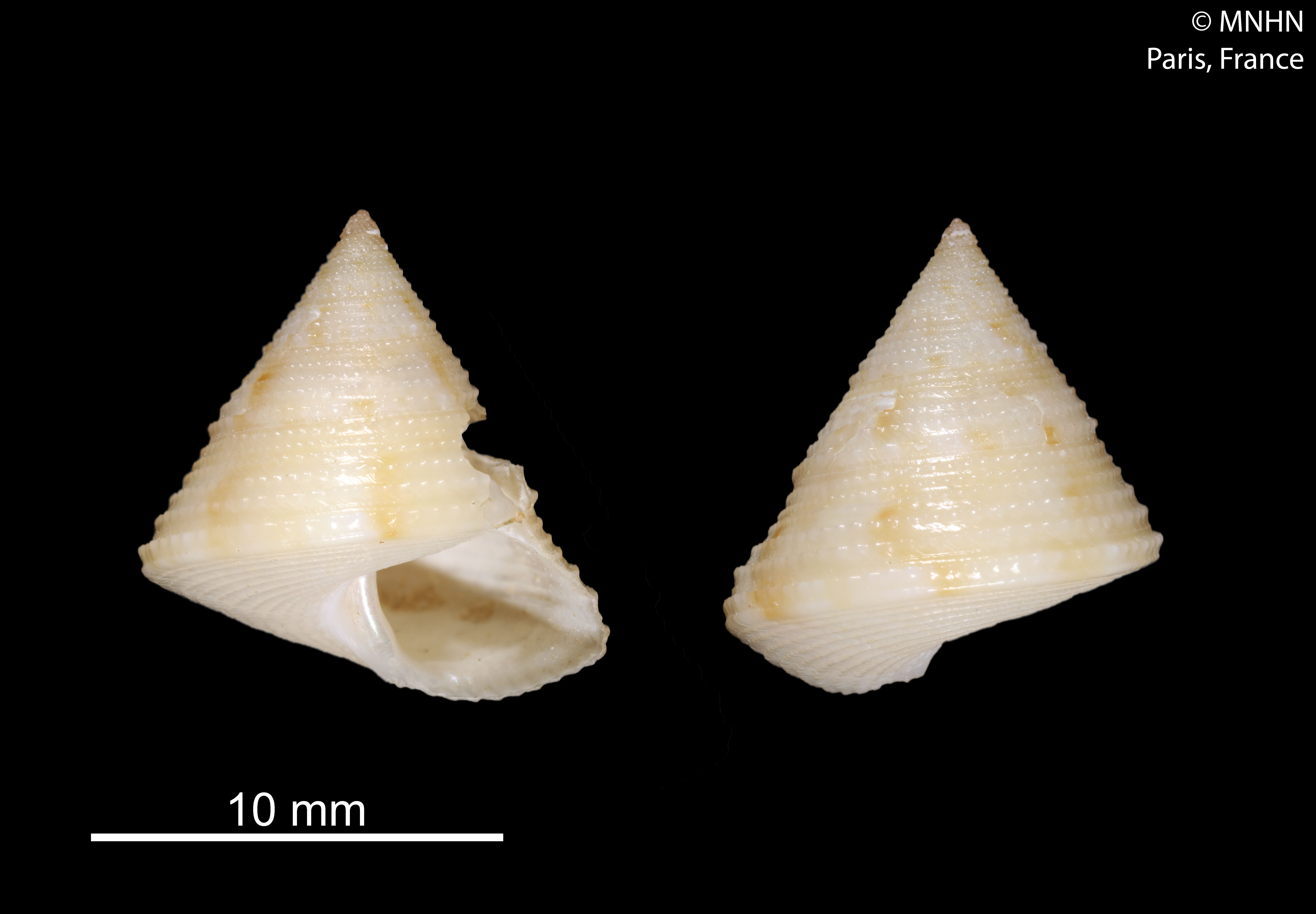
- Shell of Calliostoma vilvensi (specimen at MNHN, Paris)

Scientific classification
- Kingdom: Animalia
- Phylum: Mollusca
- Class: Gastropoda
- Subclass: Vetigastropoda
- Order: Trochida
- Family: Calliostomatidae
- Genus: Calliostoma
- Species: C. vilvensi

Binomial name
- Calliostoma vilvensi Poppe, 2004

= Calliostoma vilvensi =

Species of sea snail

Calliostoma vilvensi is a species of sea snail, a marine gastropod mollusk in the family Calliostomatidae.

== Description ==
The shell of Calliostoma vilvensi is moderately tall and conical, with a height typically ranging between 12 mm and 23 mm. It features a solid, non-umbilicate (imperforate) base and slightly convex whorls.

=== Morphology ===
- Protoconch: The larval shell consists of approximately 1.5 whorls and exhibits a fine, reticulate (net-like) sculpture characteristic of the genus.
- Teleoconch: The adult shell comprises about 8 whorls. These are adorned with distinct beaded spiral cords. The beads are small, rounded, and closely set.
- Aperture and Base: The aperture is subquadrate and possesses a highly nacreous (pearly) interior. The base of the shell is nearly flat, decorated with 10 to 12 smooth or slightly granular spiral cords.
- Coloration: The background color is generally a creamy pinkish-white or light tan. It is frequently marked with darker reddish-brown flammules or blotches, particularly near the suture.

== Taxonomy ==
The species was described by the Belgian malacologist Guido Poppe in 2004. It was named in honor of Claude Vilvens, a fellow malacologist and expert on the superfamily Trochoidea. Within the genus Calliostoma, this species is noted for its particularly elegant shell sculpture and vivid pearlescent interior.

== Distribution and habitat ==
This marine species is found within the Coral Triangle in the tropical Western Pacific. Known populations are located off:

- The Philippines (notably around the Zamboanga Peninsula, Mactan Island, and Aliguay Island).
- The Solomon Islands.

It is a deep-water benthic species, usually found at depths between 80 m and 350 m. Most specimens are collected by local fishermen using tangle nets or by deep-sea dredging.

== Comparison ==
Calliostoma vilvensi is similar in appearance to Calliostoma vicentweiri, but can be distinguished by its flatter base and the specific arrangement of the beaded cords on the upper whorls. Additionally, C. vilvensi often displays more pronounced reddish-brown flammules compared to the more uniform coloration of related deep-water species.
