= Aesopus fuscostrigatus =

Scientific classification
- Kingdom: Animalia
- Phylum: Mollusca
- Class: Gastropoda
- Subclass: Caenogastropoda
- Order: Neogastropoda
- Family: Columbellidae
- Genus: Aesopus
- Species: A. fuscostrigatus

Binomial name
- Aesopus fuscostrigatus (P. P. Carpenter, 1864)

Synonyms
- Anachis fuscostrigata P. P. Carpenter, 1864 superseded combination

Species of gastropod

Aesopus fuscostrigatus is a species of sea snail, a marine gastropod mollusk in the family Columbellidae, the dove snails.

== Description ==
(Original description in Latin) The small, turreted shell is livid with a shiny surface. It is prominently encircled by red-brown zones, which are subspiral and occasionally confluent, especially near the base. Almost obsolete radiating lirae are visible near the suture. The aperture is sub-square.

== Distribution ==
This marine species occurs off Cape San Lucas, Mexico.
