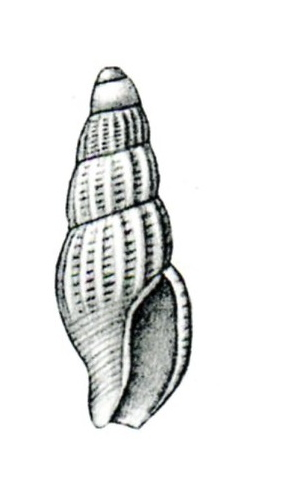
- Shell of Aesopus veneris (holotype)

Scientific classification
- Kingdom: Animalia
- Phylum: Mollusca
- Class: Gastropoda
- Subclass: Caenogastropoda
- Order: Neogastropoda
- Family: Columbellidae
- Genus: Aesopus
- Species: A. veneris

Binomial name
- Aesopus veneris (Thiele, 1925)

Synonyms
- Columbella veneris Thiele, 1925 (original combination)

= Aesopus veneris =

Species of gastropod

Aesopus veneris is a species of sea snail, a marine gastropod mollusk in the family Columbellidae, the dove snails.

== Distribution ==
This marine species occurs off Cape Agulhas, South Africa.
