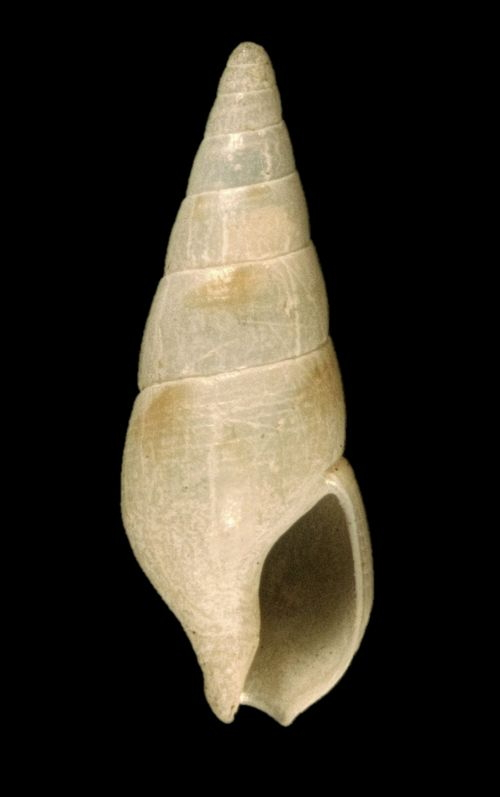
- Shell of Aesopus plurisulcatus (specimen at Naturalis Biodiversity Center)

Scientific classification
- Kingdom: Animalia
- Phylum: Mollusca
- Class: Gastropoda
- Subclass: Caenogastropoda
- Order: Neogastropoda
- Family: Columbellidae
- Genus: Aesopus
- Species: A. plurisulcatus

Binomial name
- Aesopus plurisulcatus (Reeve, 1859)

Synonyms
- Aesopus filosus Angas, 1867; Columbella plurisulcata Reeve, 1859 (original combination); Lavesopus plurisulcatus (Reeve, 1859)

= Aesopus plurisulcatus =

Species of gastropod

Aesopus plurisulcatus is a species of sea snail, a marine gastropod mollusk in the family Columbellidae, the dove snails.

== Description ==
(Described as Aesopus filosus) The shell is elongately fusiform, displaying a pale fulvous or brown color with darker brown spots and white markings below the sutures. The spire is acuminately turreted, with a slightly obtuse apex. The shell comprises eight slightly convex whorls, each finely transversely sulcated. The body whorl accounts for nearly one-third of the shell's total length. The aperture is moderately sized and ovate in shape. The columella is arched, and the outer lip is slightly thickened externally, featuring denticulations on the inner surface.

== Distribution ==
This marine species is endemic to Australia and occurs off New South Wales, Tasmania and Victoria.
