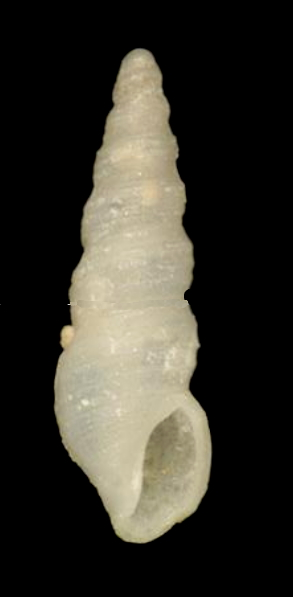
- Shell of Aesopus cassandra (holotype in the Australian Museum)

Scientific classification
- Kingdom: Animalia
- Phylum: Mollusca
- Class: Gastropoda
- Subclass: Caenogastropoda
- Order: Neogastropoda
- Family: Columbellidae
- Genus: Aesopus
- Species: A. cassandra

Binomial name
- Aesopus cassandra (Hedley, 1904)

Synonyms
- Daphnella cassandra Hedley, 1904 (superseded combination)

= Aesopus cassandra =

Species of gastropod

Aesopus cassandra is a species of sea snail, a marine gastropod mollusk in the family Columbellidae, the dove snails.

== Description ==
The length of the shell varies between 5 mm and 15 mm, its diameter between 1 mm and 6 mm.

The shell is small, slender, tall, and moderately solid. Its color is white (possibly bleached). It comprises seven whorls, including a two-whorled exserted protoconch, and is angled at the suture.

The sculpture features small, sharp spiral threads, with three on the earlier whorls and about ten on the body whorl. Above, the threads are widely spaced, but they become crowded towards the base. The interstices are latticed by growth lines. The aperture is narrow and oblong, with a short siphonal canal.

== Distribution ==
This marine species is endemic to Australia and occurs off New South Wales, South Australia, Tasmania and Victoria.
