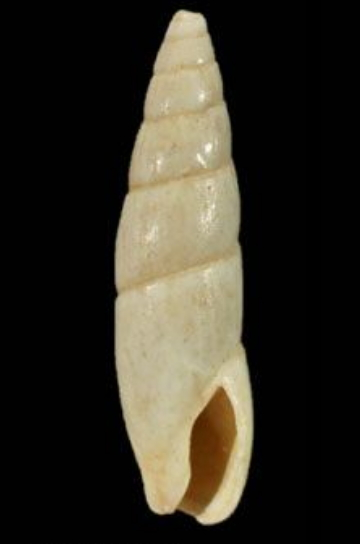
- Shell of Aesopus obesus (species at the Natural History Museum of Rotterdam)

Scientific classification
- Kingdom: Animalia
- Phylum: Mollusca
- Class: Gastropoda
- Subclass: Caenogastropoda
- Order: Neogastropoda
- Family: Columbellidae
- Genus: Aesopus
- Species: A. obesus

Binomial name
- Aesopus obesus (Hinds, 1844)
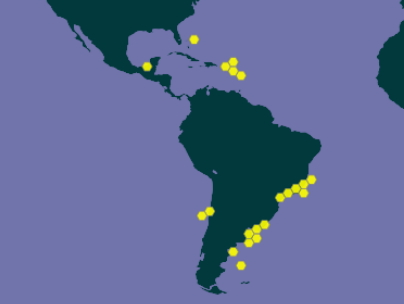

Synonyms
- Aesopus metcalfei (Reeve, 1860); Columbella acus Reeve, 1859; Columbella lumbricus Reeve, 1859; Terebra metcalfei Reeve, 1860; Terebra obesa Hinds, 1844

= Aesopus obesus =

Species of gastropod

Aesopus obesus, common name the fat dovesnail, is a species of sea snail, a marine gastropod mollusc in the family Columbellidae, the dove snails.

== Description ==
The size of an adult shell varies between 5 mm and 14 mm.

(Original description in Latin) The smooth shell is obese and awl-shaped. It is white, adorned with pale longitudinal brown spots. It features a few subrounded whorls, with the body whorl biseriately spotted. The spire is obsoletely folded. The aperture is oblong, and the columella is truncated.

(Described as Columbella acus) The shell is narrowly elongated. It features minutely ribbed longitudinal patterns towards the apex. Its color is yellowish, irregularly streaked with orange-brown. The whorls are rather flattened. The aperture is very small, and the columella is slightly excavated and truncated. The outer lip is simple and scarcely denticulated within.

== Distribution ==
This species occurs in the Caribbean Sea and the Lesser Antilles; in the Pacific Ocean from Colombia to Argentina in the Atlantic Ocean.
