= Aesopus sanctus =

Scientific classification
- Kingdom: Animalia
- Phylum: Mollusca
- Class: Gastropoda
- Subclass: Caenogastropoda
- Order: Neogastropoda
- Family: Columbellidae
- Genus: Aesopus
- Species: A. sanctus

Binomial name
- Aesopus sanctus Dall, 1919
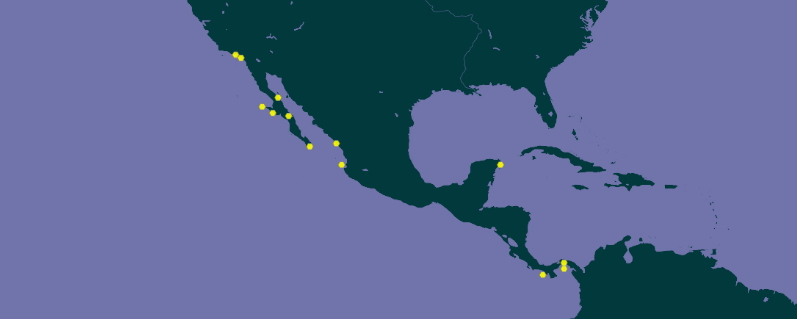

Species of gastropod

Aesopus sanctus, common name the Santa Monica dovesnail, is a species of sea snail, a marine gastropod mollusk in the family Columbellidae, the dove snails.

== Description ==
The length of the shell attains 4.3 mm, its diameter 1.6 mm.

(Original description) The shell is small and light pinkish-brown, with just under five whorls. One of these whorls forms a globose, smooth protoconch. The suture is distinct. The whorls are moderately convex. The aperture is simple and short. The columella is smooth, twisted, and shorter than the outer lip. The entire surface of the shell is minutely and evenly striated in a spiral pattern.

== Distribution ==
This marine species occurs off San Pedro, Los Angeles County, California, to Gulf of California, Mexico, in subtidal waters to 60 mm; also off Panama.

Fossils have been found in Late/Upper Pleistocene strata in California (0.12900 to 0.01170 Ma).
