= Otitoma kagoshimaensis =

Scientific classification
- Kingdom: Animalia
- Phylum: Mollusca
- Class: Gastropoda
- Subclass: Caenogastropoda
- Order: Neogastropoda
- Superfamily: Conoidea
- Family: Pseudomelatomidae
- Genus: Otitoma
- Species: †O. kagoshimaensis

Binomial name
- †Otitoma kagoshimaensis (T. Shuto, 1965)

Synonyms
- †Thelecytharella kagoshimaensis (Shuto, 1965); †Turridrupa kagoshimaensis Shuto, 1965 (original combination)

Extinct species of gastropod

Otitoma kagoshimaensis is an extinct species of sea snail, a marine gastropod mollusk in the family Pseudomelatomidae, the turrids and allies.

== Distribution ==
Fossils of this marine species were found in Upper Pleistocene strata in Japan.
