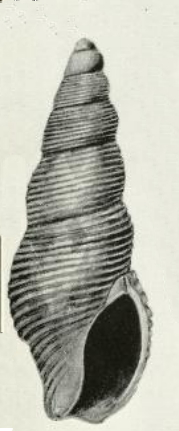
- Shell of Aesopus solidus (holotype)

Scientific classification
- Kingdom: Animalia
- Phylum: Mollusca
- Class: Gastropoda
- Subclass: Caenogastropoda
- Order: Neogastropoda
- Family: Columbellidae
- Genus: Aesopus
- Species: A. solidus

Binomial name
- Aesopus solidus (May, 1911)
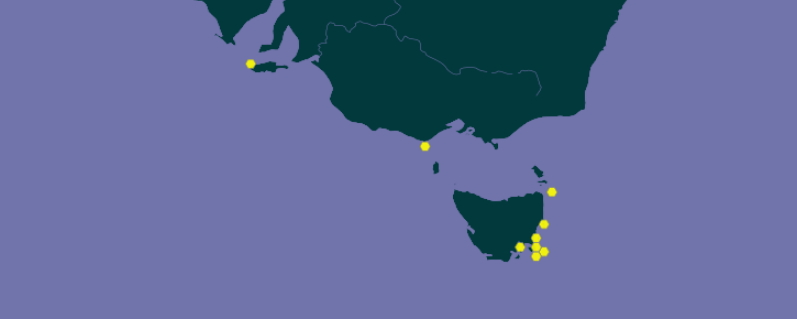

Synonyms
- Mitromorpha solida May, 1911 (original combination)

= Aesopus solidus =

Species of gastropod

Aesopus solidus is a species of sea snail, a marine gastropod mollusk in the family Columbellidae, the dove snails.

== Description ==
The length of the shell attains 9.4 mm, its diameter 3.3 mm.

(Original description) The shell is solid and elongate. It is predominantly whitish with a few rusty spots below the suture and around the middle of the body whorl. It comprises six rounded whorls, including a smooth two-whorled protoconch. The aperture is wide and open, contracting anteriorly. The outer lip is rounded and simple, without a sinus. The inner lip is strongly curved and simple.

The spire whorls feature each approximately ten strong spiral lirae, separated by slightly narrower grooves. These lirae continue almost to the base of the body whorl.

== Distribution ==
This marine species is endemic to Australia and occurs off Tasmania.
