= Otitoma lirata =

- Shell of Otitoma lirata

Scientific classification
- Kingdom: Animalia
- Phylum: Mollusca
- Class: Gastropoda
- Subclass: Caenogastropoda
- Order: Neogastropoda
- Superfamily: Conoidea
- Family: Pseudomelatomidae
- Genus: Otitoma
- Species: O. lirata

Binomial name
- Otitoma lirata (Reeve, 1845)

Synonyms
- Daphnella lirata (Reeve, 1845); Lophiotoma cerithiformis Powell, A.W.B., 1964; Pleurotoma lirata Reeve, 1845 (basionym)

Species of gastropod

Otitoma lirata is a species of sea snail, a marine gastropod mollusk in the family Pseudomelatomidae, the turrids and allies.

== Description ==
The length of the shell attains 35 mm, its diameter 12 mm.

The fusiform shell is turreted and keeled all over. The keels are nearly of the same size, and almost equidistant. The keel on the middle of the whorls is slightly the largest. The intermediate superfices are concave. The interstices between the keels are finely striate longitudinally. The sinus is deep. The siphonal canal is short. The color of the shell is white, the keels are spotted with reddish brown.

== Distribution ==
This species occurs in the Pacific Ocean off Hawaii, United States; also off the Philippines.
