= Otitoma philpoppei =

Scientific classification
- Kingdom: Animalia
- Phylum: Mollusca
- Class: Gastropoda
- Subclass: Caenogastropoda
- Order: Neogastropoda
- Superfamily: Conoidea
- Family: Pseudomelatomidae
- Genus: Otitoma
- Species: O. philpoppei

Binomial name
- Otitoma philpoppei Morassi, Nappo & Bonfitto, 2017

Species of gastropod

Otitoma philpoppei is a species of sea snail, a marine gastropod mollusk in the family Pseudomelatomidae, the turrids and allies.

== Description ==
The length of the shell varies between 5 mm and 8 mm.

== Distribution ==
This marine species occurs off the Philippines and the Fiji Islands.
