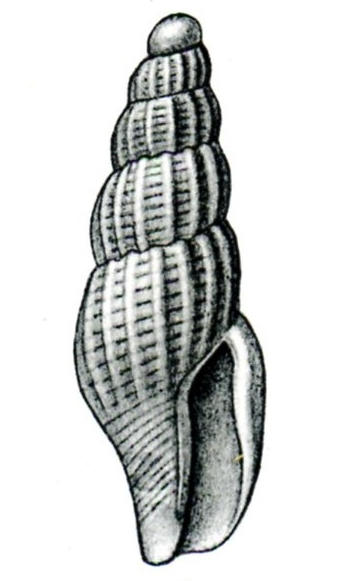
- Shell of Aesopus meta (holotype)

Scientific classification
- Kingdom: Animalia
- Phylum: Mollusca
- Class: Gastropoda
- Subclass: Caenogastropoda
- Order: Neogastropoda
- Family: Columbellidae
- Genus: Aesopus
- Species: A. meta

Binomial name
- Aesopus meta (Thiele, 1925)

Synonyms
- Anachis meta (Thiele, 1925); Columbella meta Thiele, 1925 (original combination)

= Aesopus meta =

Species of gastropod

Aesopus meta is a species of sea snail, a marine gastropod mollusk in the family Columbellidae, the dove snails.

== Description ==
The length of the shell attains 9 mm.

== Distribution ==
This marine species occurs off the Agulhas Bank, South Africa.
