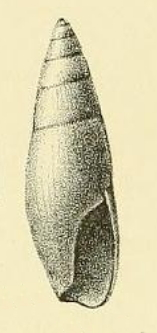
- Shell of Aesopus urania (holotype)

Scientific classification
- Kingdom: Animalia
- Phylum: Mollusca
- Class: Gastropoda
- Subclass: Caenogastropoda
- Order: Neogastropoda
- Family: Columbellidae
- Genus: Aesopus
- Species: A. urania

Binomial name
- Aesopus urania Melvill & Standen, 1901

Synonyms
- Aesopus urania var. albens Melvill & Standen, 1901 ·

= Aesopus urania =

Species of gastropod

Aesopus urania is a species of sea snail, a marine gastropod mollusk in the family Columbellidae, the dove snails.

== Description ==
(Original description in Latin) The shell is thin, fusiform, and narrow, with a shiny brown exterior contrasting with a shining white apex. It has 6-7 whorls, the apical three being very light and vitreous, while the others are darkly but finely spirally striated and slightly brown. The aperture is narrow and oblong, with a slightly expanded outer lip. The columella is oblique and truncated towards the base.

The species is characterized by its fusiform shell, which is broadly truncate posteriorly, with a linear aperture and a posterior callus (although this feature is not prominent in our specimens). The columella is smooth and vitreous.

The color of the shell is typically uniformly chestnut or darker brown, fading into white towards the apex. The variety albens is completely colorless, possibly representing a bleached specimen. The last two or three whorls are largely vitreous.

The aperture is narrow, and the columella is basally truncate and oblique. The outer lip shows a slight effusion. The entire surface of the whorls is closely, but obscurely, spirally striated.

== Distribution ==
This marine species occurs in the Gulf of Oman off Iran.
