= Austropusilla simoniana =

Scientific classification
- Kingdom: Animalia
- Phylum: Mollusca
- Class: Gastropoda
- Subclass: Caenogastropoda
- Order: Neogastropoda
- Superfamily: Conoidea
- Family: Raphitomidae
- Genus: Austropusilla
- Species: A. simoniana

Binomial name
- Austropusilla simoniana Kilburn, 1974

Species of gastropod

Austropusilla simoniana is a species of sea snail, a marine gastropod mollusk in the family Raphitomidae.

== Description ==
The length of the shell attains 5 mm.

== Distribution ==
This marine species is endemic to South Africa and occurs off the Cape Province.
