= Otitoma oyamai =

Scientific classification
- Kingdom: Animalia
- Phylum: Mollusca
- Class: Gastropoda
- Subclass: Caenogastropoda
- Order: Neogastropoda
- Superfamily: Conoidea
- Family: Pseudomelatomidae
- Genus: Otitoma
- Species: †O. oyamai

Binomial name
- †Otitoma oyamai (T. Shuto, 1965)

Synonyms
- †Agladrillia oyamai Shuto, 1965 (original combination); †Thelecytharella oyamai (Shuto, 1965)

Extinct species of gastropod

Otitoma oyamai is an extinct species of sea snail, a marine gastropod mollusk in the family Pseudomelatomidae, the turrids and allies.

This species used to be the type species of Thelecytharella (now considered a synonym of Otitoma).

== Distribution ==
Fossils of this marine species were found in Upper Pleistocene strata in Kyushu, Japan.
