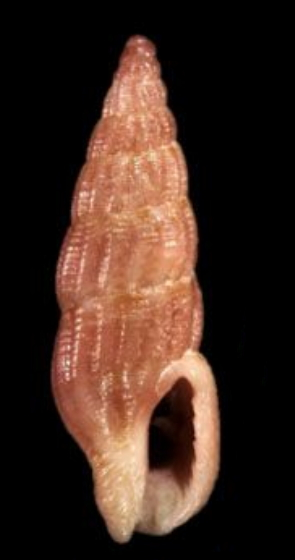
- Shell of Aesopus geraldsmithi (specimen at the Natural History Museum of Rotterdam)

Scientific classification
- Kingdom: Animalia
- Phylum: Mollusca
- Class: Gastropoda
- Subclass: Caenogastropoda
- Order: Neogastropoda
- Family: Columbellidae
- Genus: Aesopus
- Species: A. geraldsmithi

Binomial name
- Aesopus geraldsmithi Lussi M., 2001

= Aesopus geraldsmithi =

Species of gastropod

Aesopus geraldsmithi is a species of sea snail, a marine gastropod mollusc in the family Columbellidae, the dove snails.

== Distribution ==
This marine species occurs off KwaZulu-Natal, South Africa.
