= Otitoma metuloides =

Scientific classification
- Kingdom: Animalia
- Phylum: Mollusca
- Class: Gastropoda
- Subclass: Caenogastropoda
- Order: Neogastropoda
- Superfamily: Conoidea
- Family: Pseudomelatomidae
- Genus: Otitoma
- Species: O. metuloides

Binomial name
- Otitoma metuloides (Kilburn, 1995)

Synonyms
- Thelecytharella metuloides Kilburn, 1995 (original combination)

Species of gastropod

Otitoma metuloides is a species of sea snail, a marine gastropod mollusk in the family Pseudomelatomidae, the turrids and allies.

== Distribution ==
This marine species occurs off Zululand, South Africa. These marine creatures are found in the bottom most part of the sea. The scientific name of the species was first validly published in 1995 by Kilburn. Otitoma metuloides form shallow marine sediments. It is a predator. It has sexual reproduction.
