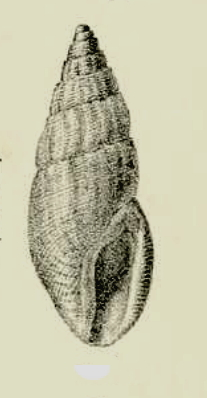
- Shell of Aesopus multistriatus (holotype)

Scientific classification
- Kingdom: Animalia
- Phylum: Mollusca
- Class: Gastropoda
- Subclass: Caenogastropoda
- Order: Neogastropoda
- Family: Columbellidae
- Genus: Aesopus
- Species: A. multistriatus

Binomial name
- Aesopus multistriatus (Preston, 1905)

Synonyms
- Columbella (Mitrella) multistriata Preston, 1905 superseded combination

= Aesopus multistriatus =

Species of gastropod

Aesopus multistriatus is a species of sea snail, a marine gastropod mollusk in the family Columbellidae, the dove snails.

== Description ==
The length of the Aesopus multistriatus shell can get to 7.5 mm, and its diameter can get to 2.75 mm.

(Original description) The pale whitish shell is fusiform and features 8 to 9 whorls. These whorls are finely sculptured with very fine spiral striae and indistinct transverse, undulating ridges, which are slightly more pronounced on the upper whorls. The suture is shallow and slightly crenulate. The peristome is somewhat thickened and expanded downwards toward the center. The columella curves downward, joined to the lip above by a thick callosity. The aperture is elongately oval, with a short and rather broad siphonal canal.

== Distribution ==
This marine species is endemic and occurs off Sri Lanka.
