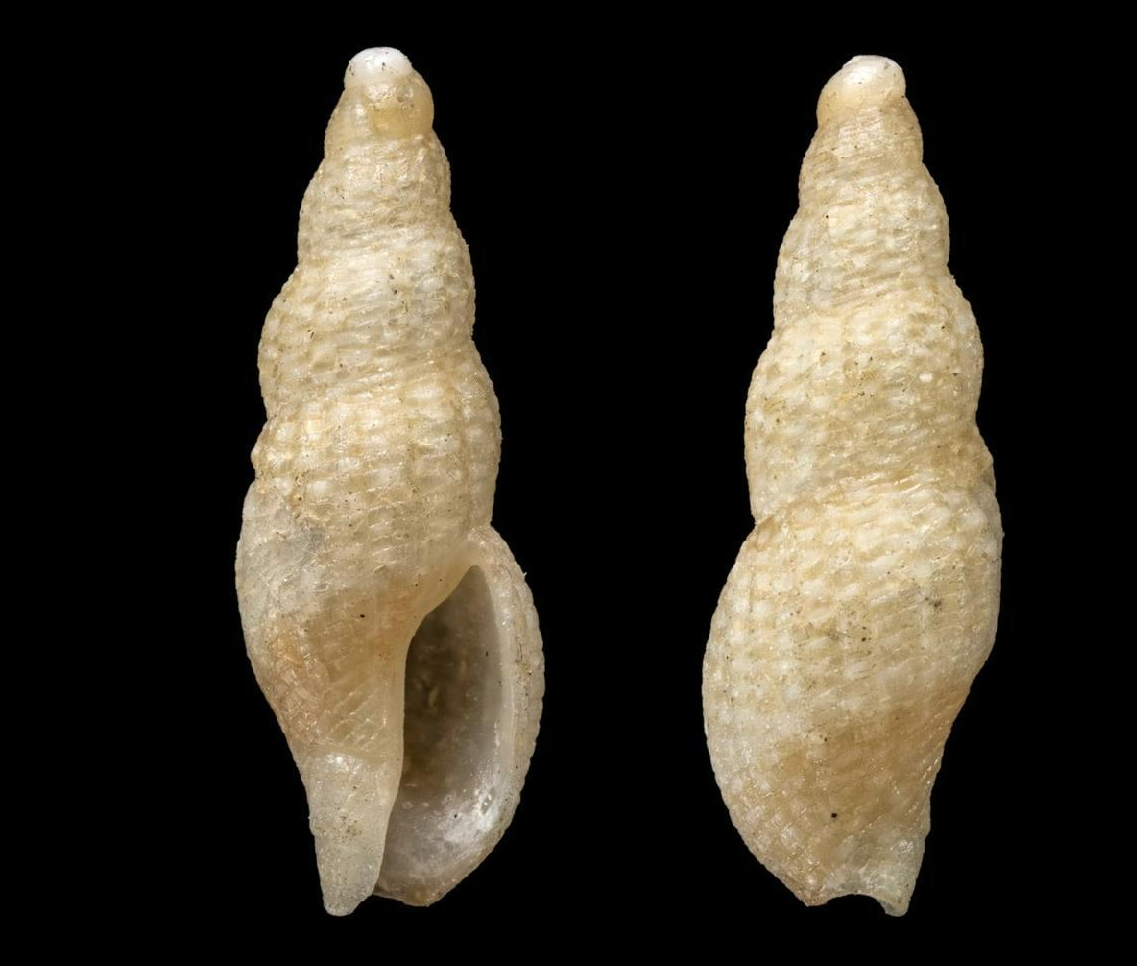
- Shell of Aesopus algoensis (specimen at NHM, London))

Scientific classification
- Kingdom: Animalia
- Phylum: Mollusca
- Class: Gastropoda
- Subclass: Caenogastropoda
- Order: Neogastropoda
- Family: Columbellidae
- Genus: Aesopus
- Species: A. algoensis

Binomial name
- Aesopus algoensis (G. B. Sowerby III, 1892)
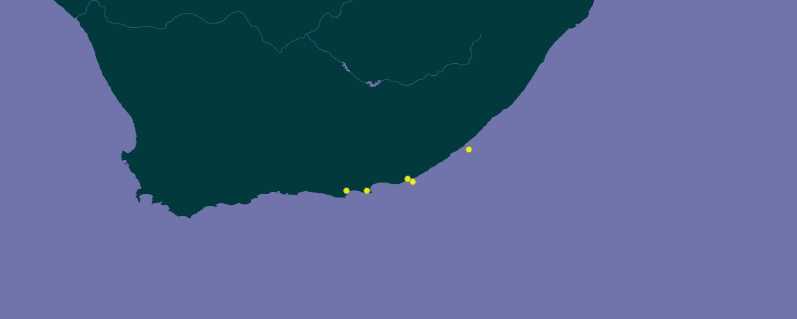

Synonyms
- Columbella algoensis G. B. Sowerby III, 1892 (original combination)

= Aesopus algoensis =

Species of gastropod

Aesopus algoensis is a species of sea snail, a marine gastropod mollusc in the family Columbellidae, the dove snails.

== Description ==
The length of an adult shell attains 8 mm, its diameter 2¾ mm.

(original description in Latin) The shell is elongate and turreted. It shows a yellow base color adorned sporadically with light brown transverse interstices and brown zoning towards the anterior. The spire is pronounced, ending in a papillary apex, with distinct sutures. It consists of five slightly convex whorls, irregularly folded longitudinally and densely sulcate spirally. The body whorl is narrow. The columella is slightly recurved, and the aperture is small with a thin outer lip.

== Distribution ==
This marine species occurs off Algoa Bay, South Africa.
