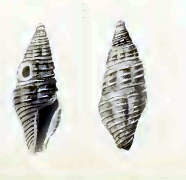
- Original image of a shell of Otitoma kwandangensis

Scientific classification
- Kingdom: Animalia
- Phylum: Mollusca
- Class: Gastropoda
- Subclass: Caenogastropoda
- Order: Neogastropoda
- Superfamily: Conoidea
- Family: Pseudomelatomidae
- Genus: Otitoma
- Species: O. kwandangensis

Binomial name
- Otitoma kwandangensis (Schepman, 1913)

Synonyms
- Drillia kwandangensis Schepman, 1913 (original combination); Notocytharella kwangdangensis (M.M. Schepman, 1913); Thelecytharella kwandangensis (Schepman, 1913)

= Otitoma kwandangensis =

Species of gastropod

Otitoma kwandangensis is a species of sea snail, a marine gastropod mollusk in the family Pseudomelatomidae.

== Description ==
The length of the shell is 8½ mm, and its diameter 3 mm.

(Original description) The strong shell has an elongated fusiform shape. It has a rather dark, uniform reddish-brown color. It contains 8 whorls, of which 3 form a smooth, red-brown protoconch. The whorls of the teleoconch are slightly convex, strongly lirate below the suture, with at first 2, lower on 3 strong spiral lirae on each whorl, 14 in number on the body whorl and 2 faint ones below subsutural liration, more or less visible on upper whorls. The whorls are crossed by thick, rounded ribs, making the lirae slightly beaded, 9 in number on the penultimate whorl, faint on the last one, which has a very strong rib behind the peristome. Moreover, the shell is crossed by conspicuous growth lines. The aperture is oblong and angular above. The peristome is rather thin, with a conspicuous sinus above, then protracted towards the middle. The columellar margin is concave above, straight below, with a strong layer of enamel, and a tubercle above at the sinus. The interior of the aperture is smooth, red-brown with a bluish tint in its depth. The siphonal canal is straight and rather narrow.

== Distribution ==
This marine species is endemic to Indonesia.
