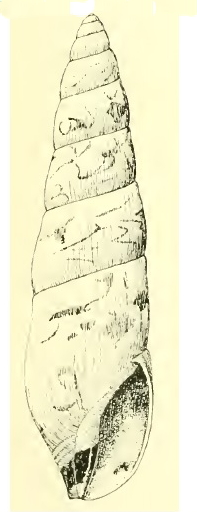
- Shell of Aesopus goforthi (holotype)

Scientific classification
- Kingdom: Animalia
- Phylum: Mollusca
- Class: Gastropoda
- Subclass: Caenogastropoda
- Order: Neogastropoda
- Family: Columbellidae
- Genus: Aesopus
- Species: A. goforthi

Binomial name
- Aesopus goforthi Dall, 1912

= Aesopus goforthi =

Species of gastropod

Aesopus goforthi is a species of sea snail, a marine gastropod mollusk in the family Columbellidae, the dove snails.

This is a taxon inquirendum.

== Description ==
The length of the shell attains 13 mm, its diameter 3.3 mm.

(Original description) The shell is smooth, slender, and elongate, with inconspicuous sutures and approximately eight whorls. The protoconch is defective and smooth, while the subsequent whorls gradually increase in size and are moderately convex. The shell's color is greenish-waxen with dark chestnut flammules, so arranged on the body whorl as to form two irregular bands: one above and one below the periphery. These bands are also visible inside the aperture and on the base of the columella. The paler surface of the shell is irregularly mottled with opaque whitish blotches. The aperture is short and relatively wide, with a simple, sharp, and smooth outer lip. Both the body and columella are smooth, with a thin layer of callus. The siphonal canal is short, wide, and not recurved.

== Distribution ==
This marine species occurs off Monterey, California, USA.
