= Austropusilla profundis =

Scientific classification
- Kingdom: Animalia
- Phylum: Mollusca
- Class: Gastropoda
- Subclass: Caenogastropoda
- Order: Neogastropoda
- Superfamily: Conoidea
- Family: Raphitomidae
- Genus: Austropusilla
- Species: A. profundis

Binomial name
- Austropusilla profundis Laseron, 1954

Species of gastropod

Austropusilla profundis is a species of sea snail, a marine gastropod mollusk in the family Raphitomidae.

== Distribution ==
This marine species is endemic to Australia and occurs off New South Wales and Tasmania.
