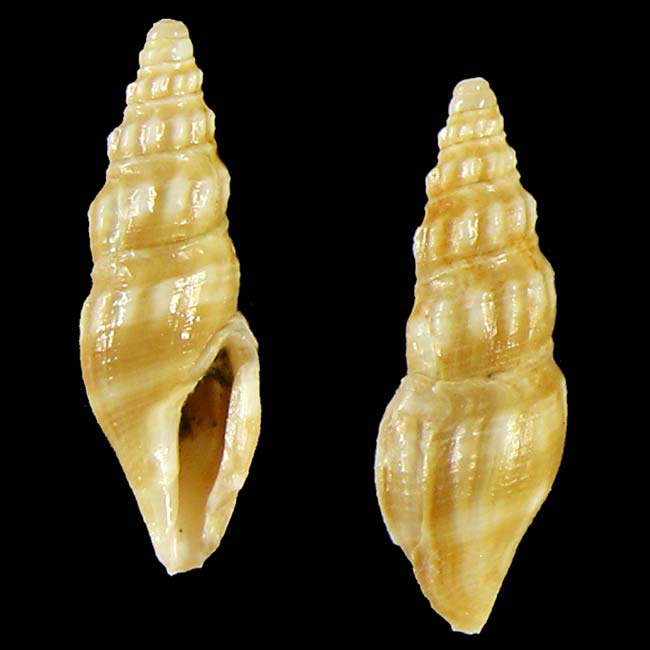
- Original image of a shell of Otitoma jennyae

Scientific classification
- Kingdom: Animalia
- Phylum: Mollusca
- Class: Gastropoda
- Subclass: Caenogastropoda
- Order: Neogastropoda
- Superfamily: Conoidea
- Family: Pseudomelatomidae
- Genus: Otitoma
- Species: O. jennyae

Binomial name
- Otitoma jennyae Stahlschmidt, Poppe & Tagaro, 2018

= Otitoma jennyae =

Species of gastropod

Otitoma jennyae is a species of predatory sea snail, a marine gastropod mollusk in the family Pseudomelatomidae, the turrids and allies.

== Description ==
The length of the shell varies between 8 mm and 12 mm.

== Distribution ==
This marine species occurs off Mactan Island, the Philippines.
