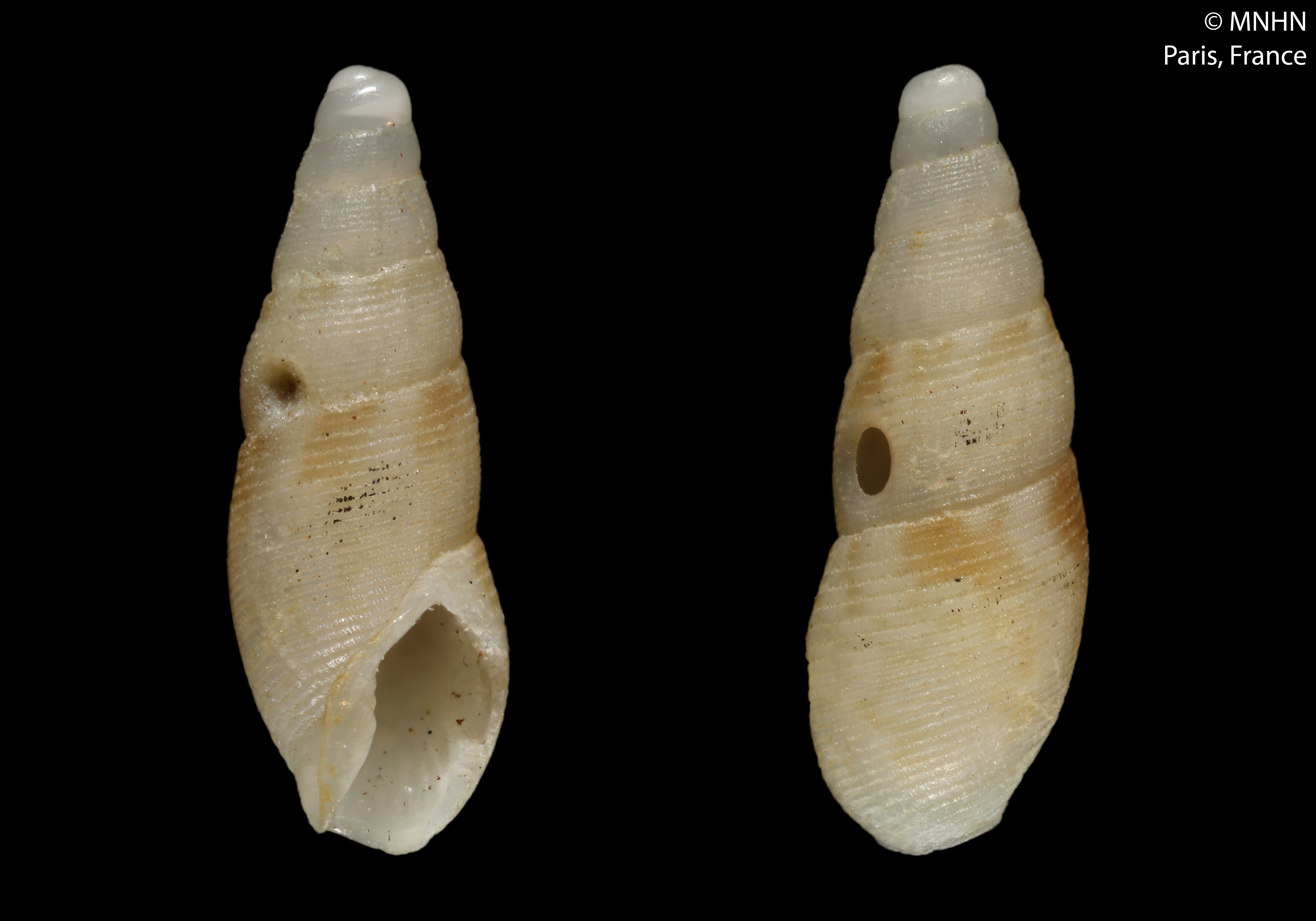
- Shell of Aesopus guyanensis (holotype at MNHN, Paris)

Scientific classification
- Kingdom: Animalia
- Phylum: Mollusca
- Class: Gastropoda
- Subclass: Caenogastropoda
- Order: Neogastropoda
- Family: Columbellidae
- Genus: Aesopus
- Species: A. guyanensis

Binomial name
- Aesopus guyanensis Pelorce, 2017

= Aesopus guyanensis =

Species of gastropod

Aesopus guyanensis is a species of sea snail, a marine gastropod mollusk in the family Columbellidae, the dove snails.

== Description ==
The length of the shell attains 44 mm (1.7 in).

== Distribution ==
This marine species occurs off French Guiana.
