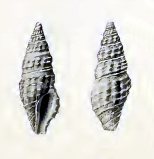
- Original image of a shell of Otitoma timorensis

Scientific classification
- Kingdom: Animalia
- Phylum: Mollusca
- Class: Gastropoda
- Subclass: Caenogastropoda
- Order: Neogastropoda
- Superfamily: Conoidea
- Family: Pseudomelatomidae
- Genus: Otitoma
- Species: O. timorensis

Binomial name
- Otitoma timorensis (Schepman, 1913)

Synonyms
- Drillia timorensis Schepman, 1913 (original combination); Lioglyphostomella timorensis (M.M. Schepman, 1913); Thelecytharella timorensis (Schepman, 1913)

= Otitoma timorensis =

Species of gastropod

Otitoma timorensis is a species of sea snail, a marine gastropod mollusk in the family Pseudomelatomidae.

== Description ==
The length of the shell attains 8½ mm, its diameter 2½ mm.

(Original description) The shell is elongately fusiform, strong and reddish brown. It contains 7 whorls, of which about 1⅓ form a smooth protoconch. The remaining whorls are moderately convex with a strong liration below the suture and from 3 to 4 lirae on their lower part, 11 on the body whorl. Moreover, the shell is covered with fine spiral striae and growth lines, and is crossed by thick, rounded, oblique ribs, 12 in number on the penultimate whorl, which give the shell an elegantly beaded appearance. The last rib before the peristome is very thick. The aperture is elongately oval. The peristome is thick, with a rather shallow sinus above, protracted lower on. The columellar margin is concave above, rather straight below, with a strong layer of enamel. The siphonal canal is straight and rather narrow.

== Distribution ==
This marine species is endemic to Indonesia and is found off Timor.
