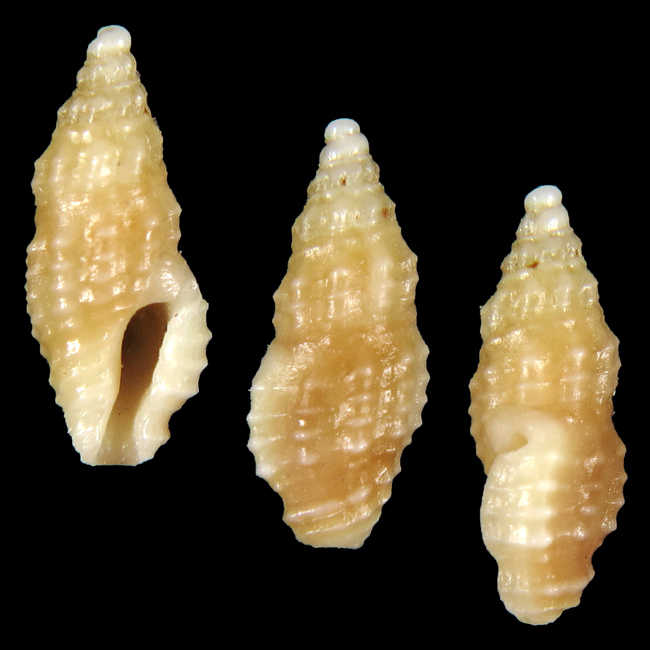

Scientific classification
- Kingdom: Animalia
- Phylum: Mollusca
- Class: Gastropoda
- Subclass: Caenogastropoda
- Order: Neogastropoda
- Superfamily: Conoidea
- Family: Pseudomelatomidae
- Genus: Otitoma
- Species: O. wiedricki

Binomial name
- Otitoma wiedricki Stahlschmidt, Poppe & Tagaro, 2018

= Otitoma wiedricki =

Species of gastropod

Otitoma wiedricki is a species of sea snail, a marine gastropod mollusc in the family Pseudomelatomidae, the turrids and allies.

== Description ==
The length of the shell varies between 4.5 mm and 6 mm.

== Distribution ==
This marine species occurs off Mactan Island, Philippines.
