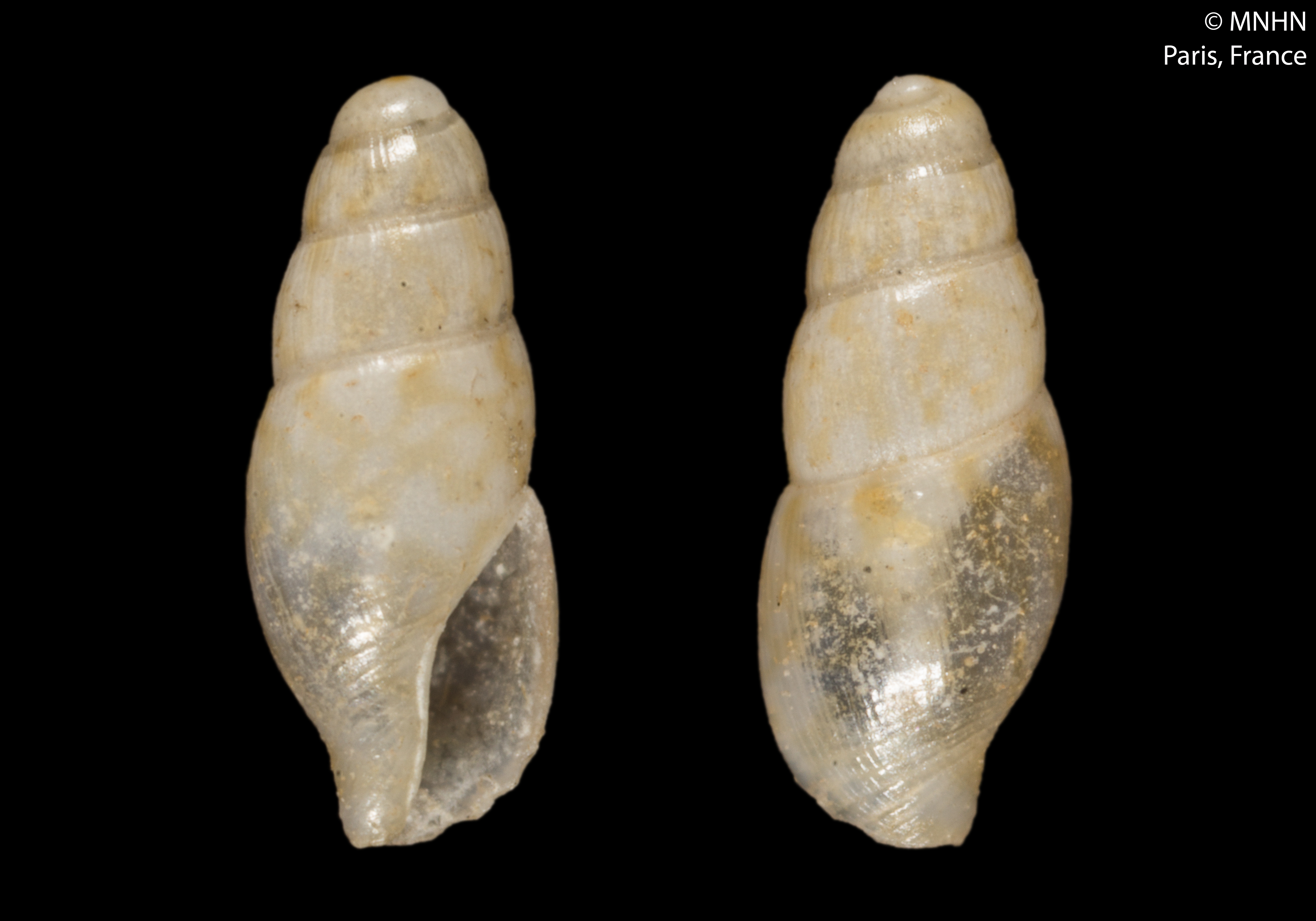
- Shell of Aesopus rotundus (holotype at MNHN, Paris)

Scientific classification
- Kingdom: Animalia
- Phylum: Mollusca
- Class: Gastropoda
- Subclass: Caenogastropoda
- Order: Neogastropoda
- Family: Columbellidae
- Genus: Aesopus
- Species: A. rotundus

Binomial name
- Aesopus rotundus Drivas & M. Jay, 1990
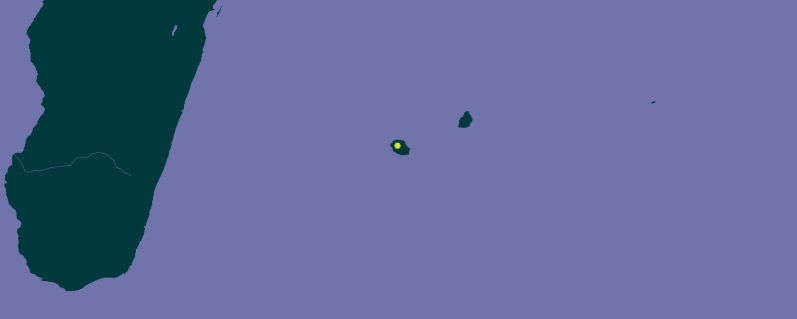

= Aesopus rotundus =

Species of gastropod

Aesopus rotundus is a species of sea snail, a marine gastropod mollusk in the family Columbellidae, the dove snails.

== Description ==
The length of the shell attains 3 mm.

== Distribution ==
This marine species occurs in the Indian Ocean off La Réunion.
