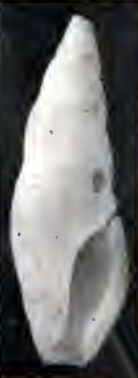
- Original image of a shell of Otitoma gouldi

Scientific classification
- Kingdom: Animalia
- Phylum: Mollusca
- Class: Gastropoda
- Subclass: Caenogastropoda
- Order: Neogastropoda
- Superfamily: Conoidea
- Family: Pseudomelatomidae
- Genus: Otitoma
- Species: O. gouldi

Binomial name
- Otitoma gouldi (Yen, 1944)

Synonyms
- Hemidaphne gouldi Yen, 1944 (basionym); Mangelia pura Gould, A.A., 1860 (not Reeve, 1846)

= Otitoma gouldi =

Species of gastropod

Otitoma gouldi is a species of sea snail, a marine gastropod mollusk in the family Pseudomelatomidae.

== Description ==
The length of the shell attains 7 mm, its diameter 2 mm.

== Distribution ==
This marine species is found along Hong Kong and Japan.
