= Aesopus japonicus =

Scientific classification
- Kingdom: Animalia
- Phylum: Mollusca
- Class: Gastropoda
- Subclass: Caenogastropoda
- Order: Neogastropoda
- Family: Columbellidae
- Genus: Aesopus
- Species: A. japonicus

Binomial name
- Aesopus japonicus A. Gould, 1860
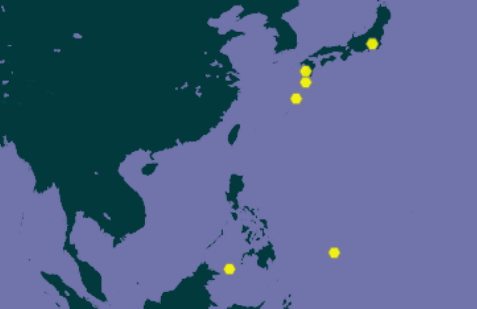

Species of gastropod

Aesopus japonicus is a species of sea snail, a marine gastropod mollusk in the family Columbellidae, the dove snails.

== Description ==
The length of the shell attains 7 mm, its diameter 2 mm.

The shell is small, solid, and chestnut-colored, with a paler area near the suture. It is characterized by rolling striae and has seven tumid whorls with rear plications. The body whorl is oval and broadly truncated, comprising about three-fifths of the total shell length. The shell features a lunate aperture and a columella that is reflexively covered with a wide, glass-like plate.

This very distinct genus, both as to shell and animal. The base is traversed by sharp transverse ridges, passing over the columella into the aperture. The broad and short tentacles, the position of the eyes, and the long, obtuse foot of the animal, are quite peculiar.

== Distribution ==
This marine species occurs in the Kagoshima Bay, Japan as well as off the coast of the Philippines.
