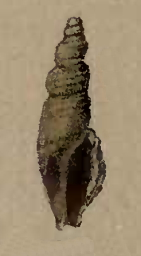
- Drawing of a shell of Otitoma vitrea

Scientific classification
- Kingdom: Animalia
- Phylum: Mollusca
- Class: Gastropoda
- Subclass: Caenogastropoda
- Order: Neogastropoda
- Superfamily: Conoidea
- Family: Pseudomelatomidae
- Genus: Otitoma
- Species: O. vitrea

Binomial name
- Otitoma vitrea (Reeve, 1845)

Synonyms
- Pleurotoma vitrea Reeve, 1845 (basionym); Thelecythara vitrea (Reeve, 1845); Thelecytharella vitrea (Reeve, 1845)

= Otitoma vitrea =

Species of gastropod

Otitoma vitrea is a species of sea snail, a marine gastropod mollusk in the family Pseudomelatomidae, the turrids and allies.

== Description ==
The length of the shell attains 5.5 mm.

The cylindrically elongated shell is thin, pellucid, glassy and smooth. It shows no longitudinal ribs. There are a few revolving grooves at the upper and lower part of the body whorl, the former appearing on the spire also. The color of the shell is yellowish white.

== Distribution ==
This marine species occurs off Singapore and the Philippines.
