= Otitoma xantholineata =

Scientific classification
- Kingdom: Animalia
- Phylum: Mollusca
- Class: Gastropoda
- Subclass: Caenogastropoda
- Order: Neogastropoda
- Superfamily: Conoidea
- Family: Pseudomelatomidae
- Genus: Otitoma
- Species: O. xantholineata

Binomial name
- Otitoma xantholineata Morassi, Nappo & Bonfitto, 2017

Species of gastropod

Otitoma xantholineata is a species of sea snail, a marine gastropod mollusk in the family Pseudomelatomidae, the turrids and allies.

== Description ==
The length of the shell varies between 7 mm and 9 mm.

== Distribution ==
This marine species occurs off the Fiji Islands.
