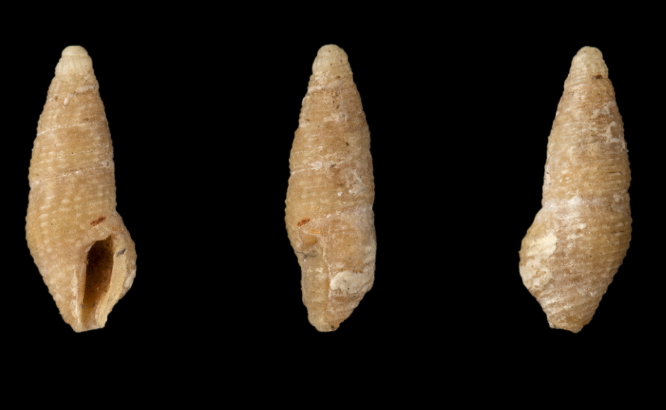
- Shell of Otitoma rubiginosa (holotype at the Natural History Museum, London)

Scientific classification
- Kingdom: Animalia
- Phylum: Mollusca
- Class: Gastropoda
- Subclass: Caenogastropoda
- Order: Neogastropoda
- Superfamily: Conoidea
- Family: Pseudomelatomidae
- Genus: Otitoma
- Species: O. rubiginosa

Binomial name
- Otitoma rubiginosa (Hinds, 1843)

Synonyms
- Clavatula rubiginosa Hinds, 1843 (original combination)

= Otitoma rubiginosa =

Species of gastropod

Otitoma rubiginosa is a species of sea snail, a marine gastropod mollusk in the family Pseudomelatomidae, the turrids and allies.

== Description ==
The length of the shell attains 7.5 mm.

The reddish brown shell contains six whorls, somewhat rounded, with revolving striae.

== Distribution ==
This marine species occurs in the Strait of Malacca
