= Aesopus gracilis =

Scientific classification
- Kingdom: Animalia
- Phylum: Mollusca
- Class: Gastropoda
- Subclass: Caenogastropoda
- Order: Neogastropoda
- Family: Columbellidae
- Genus: Aesopus
- Species: A. gracilis

Binomial name
- Aesopus gracilis Faber, 2004

Species of gastropod

Aesopus gracilis is a species of sea snail, a marine gastropod mollusk in the family Columbellidae, the dove snails.
