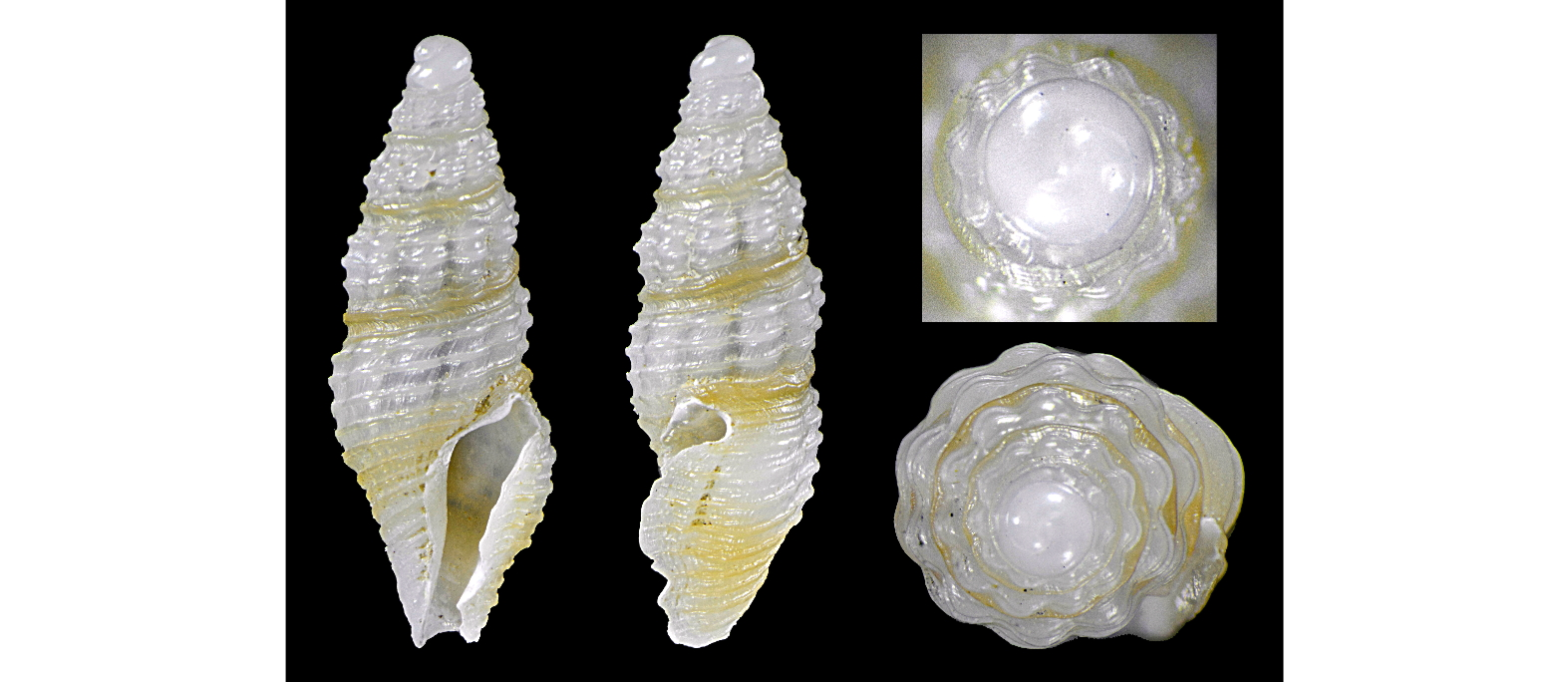
- Shell of Otitoma sororcula (holotype at MNHN, paris)

Scientific classification
- Kingdom: Animalia
- Phylum: Mollusca
- Class: Gastropoda
- Subclass: Caenogastropoda
- Order: Neogastropoda
- Superfamily: Conoidea
- Family: Pseudomelatomidae
- Genus: Otitoma
- Species: O. sororcula

Binomial name
- Otitoma sororcula Morassi, Nappo & Bonfitto, 2017

= Otitoma sororcula =

Species of gastropod

Otitoma sororcula is a species of sea snail, a marine gastropod mollusk in the family Pseudomelatomidae, the turrids and allies.

== Description ==
The length of the shell varies between 3 mm and 6.6 mm.

== Distribution ==
This marine species occurs off the Fiji Islands.

== Taxonomy ==
Otitoma sororcula was first described in 2017 by Morassi, Nappo, and Bonfitto as part of a comprehensive study on the genus Otitoma in the Western Pacific Ocean. This species is one of several new taxa identified in that publication, which expanded the known diversity of the genus. The genus Otitoma itself was previously considered a nomen dubium until it was re-evaluated and reinstated based on morphological and molecular analyses.
