= Otitoma oneili =

Scientific classification
- Kingdom: Animalia
- Phylum: Mollusca
- Class: Gastropoda
- Subclass: Caenogastropoda
- Order: Neogastropoda
- Superfamily: Conoidea
- Family: Pseudomelatomidae
- Genus: Otitoma
- Species: O. oneili

Binomial name
- Otitoma oneili (Barnard, 1958)

Synonyms
- Drillia oneili Barnard, 1958 (original combination); Thelecytharella oneili (Barnard, 1958)

Species of gastropod

Otitoma oneili is a species of sea snail, a marine gastropod mollusk in the family Pseudomelatomidae, the turrids and allies.

== Description ==
The length of the shell varies between 4.5 mm and 7.5 mm.

== Distribution ==
This marine species occurs off Zululand and KwaZulu-Natal South Africa; the Philippines and Taiwan.
