= Otitoma fergusoni =

Scientific classification
- Kingdom: Animalia
- Phylum: Mollusca
- Class: Gastropoda
- Subclass: Caenogastropoda
- Order: Neogastropoda
- Superfamily: Conoidea
- Family: Pseudomelatomidae
- Genus: Otitoma
- Species: O. fergusoni

Binomial name
- Otitoma fergusoni Wiedrick, 2014

Species of gastropod

Otitoma fergusoni is a species of sea snail, a marine gastropod mollusk in the family Pseudomelatomidae.

== Description ==
The length of the shell attains 5 mm.

== Distribution ==
This marine species occurs in the Pacific Ocean off the Cook Islands.
