= Aesopus benitoensis =

Scientific classification
- Kingdom: Animalia
- Phylum: Mollusca
- Class: Gastropoda
- Subclass: Caenogastropoda
- Order: Neogastropoda
- Family: Columbellidae
- Genus: Aesopus
- Species: A. benitoensis

Binomial name
- Aesopus benitoensis deMaintenon, 2019

Species of gastropod

Aesopus benitoensis is a species of sea snail, a marine gastropod mollusk in the family Columbellidae, the dove snails.

== Description ==
The length of the shell attains 5.2 mm.

== Distribution ==
This marine species occurs off Baja California.
