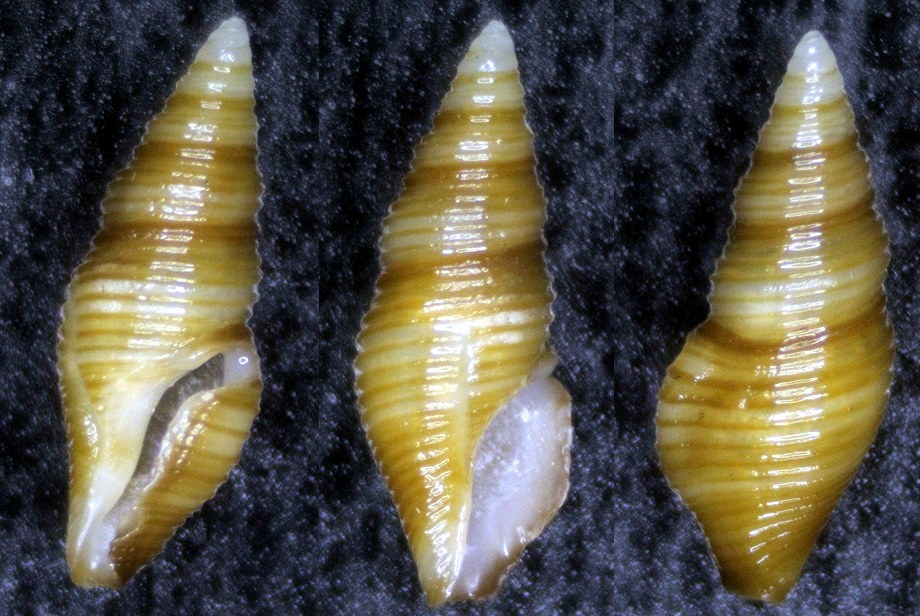
- Three views of a shell of Otitoma batjanensis

Scientific classification
- Kingdom: Animalia
- Phylum: Mollusca
- Class: Gastropoda
- Subclass: Caenogastropoda
- Order: Neogastropoda
- Superfamily: Conoidea
- Family: Pseudomelatomidae
- Genus: Otitoma
- Species: O. batjanensis

Binomial name
- Otitoma batjanensis (Schepman, 1913)

Synonyms
- Drillia batjanensis Schepman, 1913 (original combination); Maoritomella batjanensis (Schepman, 1913); Tomopleura (Maoritomella) batjanensis (Schepman, 1913)

= Otitoma batjanensis =

Species of gastropod

Otitoma batjanensis is a species of sea snail, a marine gastropod mollusk in the family Pseudomelatomidae, the turrids and allies.

== Description ==
The height of the shell attains 7.5 mm, its width 3 mm.

(Original description) The strong, whitish shell has a fusiform shape. It contains six whorls, of which three form a large, convexly-whorled, smooth and shining protoconch. The whorls of the teleoconch are moderately convex, slightly concave below a strong, yellowish, subsutural spiral. The sculpture consists of this spiral and some other ones, 7in number on penultimate, 22 and a few intermediate ones on last whorl, stronger on lower part of upper whorls and on median part of last one. The spirals are crossed by conspicuous growth-striae, stronger in the interstices, which are broader near the base. The aperture is oval and angular above. The peristome is strong, with a rather wide, deep sinus above, protracted lower on, bordered exteriorly by a strong, rounded rib. The columellar margin is slightly concave above, nearly straight below, with a strong layer of enamel, forming a wall at its upper extremity, bordering the sinus. The siphonal canal is rather wide, slightly directed to the left. The interior of the aperture is smooth and white.

== Distribution ==
This marine species occurs off Sulawesi, Indonesia.
