= Aesopus fredbakeri =

Scientific classification
- Kingdom: Animalia
- Phylum: Mollusca
- Class: Gastropoda
- Subclass: Caenogastropoda
- Order: Neogastropoda
- Family: Columbellidae
- Genus: Aesopus
- Species: A. fredbakeri

Binomial name
- Aesopus fredbakeri Pilsbry & H. N. Lowe, 1932
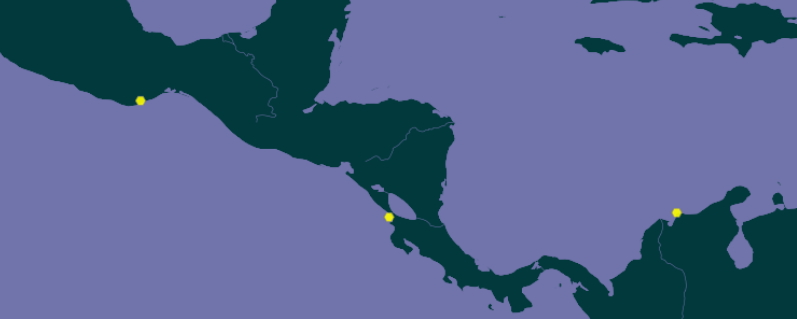

Species of gastropod

Aesopus fredbakeri is a species of sea snail, a marine gastropod mollusk in the family Columbellidae, the dove snails.

== Distribution ==
This marine species occurs off Mexico, Nicaragua and Colombia.
