= Otitoma astrolabensis =

Scientific classification
- Kingdom: Animalia
- Phylum: Mollusca
- Class: Gastropoda
- Subclass: Caenogastropoda
- Order: Neogastropoda
- Superfamily: Conoidea
- Family: Pseudomelatomidae
- Genus: Otitoma
- Species: O. astrolabensis

Binomial name
- Otitoma astrolabensis Wiedrick, 2014

Species of gastropod

Otitoma astrolabensis is a species of sea snail, a marine gastropod mollusc in the family Pseudomelatomidae, the turrids and allies.

== Description ==
The length of the shell varies between 4 and 8 mm (0.16 and 0.31 in).

== Distribution ==
This marine species occurs off the Fiji Islands, the Philippines and Indonesia.
