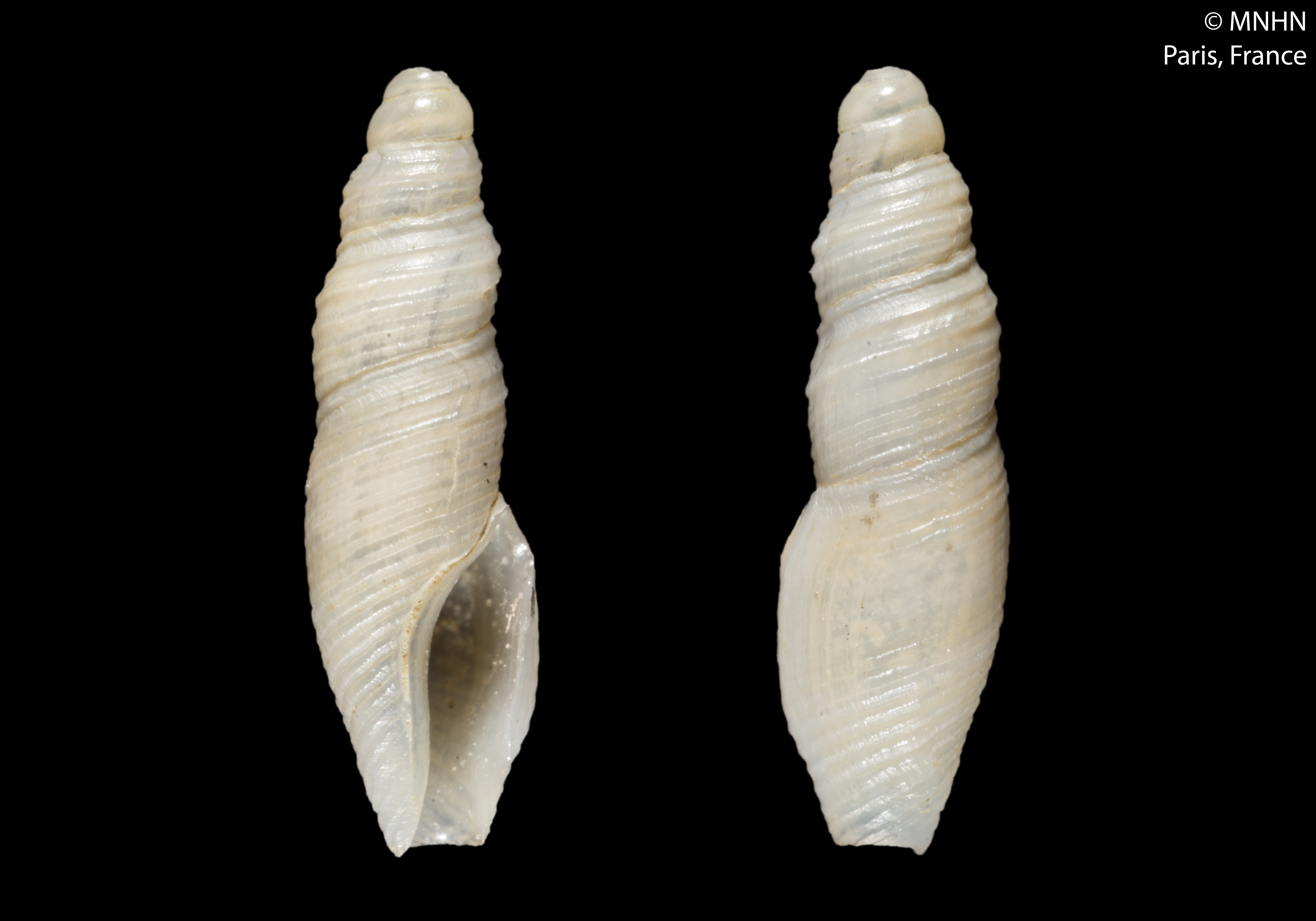

Scientific classification
- Kingdom: Animalia
- Phylum: Mollusca
- Class: Gastropoda
- Subclass: Caenogastropoda
- Order: Neogastropoda
- Superfamily: Conoidea
- Family: Pseudomelatomidae
- Genus: Otitoma
- Species: O. kecil

Binomial name
- Otitoma kecil (Sysoev, 1997)

Synonyms
- Thelecytharella kecil Sysoev, 1997

= Otitoma kecil =

Species of gastropod

Otitoma kecil is a species of sea snail, a marine gastropod mollusk in the family Pseudomelatomidae, the turrids and allies.

== Description ==
The length of the shell attains 5.5 mm.

== Distribution ==
This marine species occurs off Indonesia.
