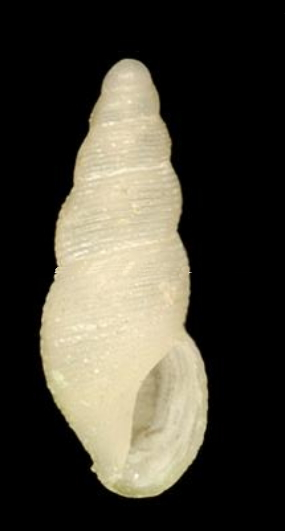
- Shell of Aesopus pallidulus (holotype in the Australian Museum)

Scientific classification
- Kingdom: Animalia
- Phylum: Mollusca
- Class: Gastropoda
- Subclass: Caenogastropoda
- Order: Neogastropoda
- Family: Columbellidae
- Genus: Aesopus
- Species: A. pallidulus

Binomial name
- Aesopus pallidulus (Hedley, 1906)

Synonyms
- Mitromorpha pallidula Hedley, 1906 (superseded combination)

= Aesopus pallidulus =

Species of gastropod

Aesopus pallidulus is a species of sea snail, a marine gastropod mollusk in the family Columbellidae, the dove snails.

== Description ==
The length of the shell attains 4.6 mm, its diameter 1.5 mm.

(Original description) The shell is small and narrow with a fusiform shape, tapering to blunt ends. It consists of five oblique whorls, including a protoconch that comprises one and a half whorls. The shell is dull white with two narrow, pale brown spiral bands on the body whorl: one at the periphery and the other between the periphery and the siphonal canal. The lower band is more distinct, spreading over five ridges and furrows.

Sculpture: The dome-shaped protoconch features fine, closely spaced radial riblets, ending with a slight varix. The teleoconch begins abruptly with seven evenly spaced spiral ridges and equal furrows, which gradually increase in size and number. On the body whorl, the ridges total twenty-six, becoming smaller and more crowded towards the anterior. The ridges are square in cross-section, polished, and slightly narrower than the flat furrows, which are radially striated.

The aperture is narrow with an excavate columella. The anal sinus is indistinguishable, and the siphonal canal forms a notch.

== Distribution ==
This marine species is endemic to Australia and occurs off New South Wales, Tasmania and Victoria.
