= Otitoma hadra =

Scientific classification
- Kingdom: Animalia
- Phylum: Mollusca
- Class: Gastropoda
- Subclass: Caenogastropoda
- Order: Neogastropoda
- Superfamily: Conoidea
- Family: Pseudomelatomidae
- Genus: Otitoma
- Species: O. hadra

Binomial name
- Otitoma hadra Morassi, Nappo & Bonfitto, 2017

Species of gastropod

Otitoma hadra is a species of sea snail, a marine gastropod mollusk in the family Pseudomelatomidae, the turrids and allies.

== Description ==
The length of the shell varies between 4.5 mm and 5.2 mm.

== Distribution ==
This marine species occurs in the Pacific Ocean off the New Caledonia.
