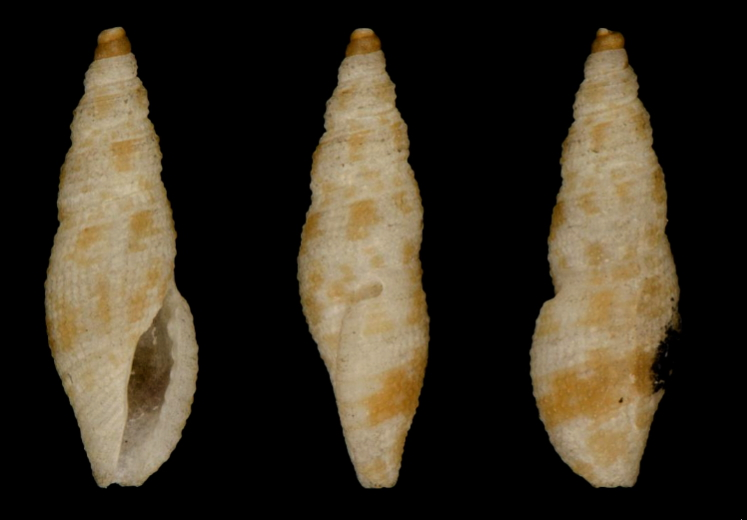
- Shell of Otitoma deluta (holotype at the Smithsonian Institution)

Scientific classification
- Kingdom: Animalia
- Phylum: Mollusca
- Class: Gastropoda
- Subclass: Caenogastropoda
- Order: Neogastropoda
- Superfamily: Conoidea
- Family: Pseudomelatomidae
- Genus: Otitoma
- Species: O. deluta

Binomial name
- Otitoma deluta (Gould, 1860)

Synonyms
- Daphnella deluta Gould, 1860; Hemidaphne deluta Gould, 1860

= Otitoma deluta =

Species of gastropod

Otitoma deluta is a species of sea snail, a marine gastropod mollusk in the family Pseudomelatomidae, the turrids and allies.

== Description ==
The length of the shell varies between 6 mm and 8 mm.

== Distribution ==
This marine species occurs in the South China Sea and off the Philippines
