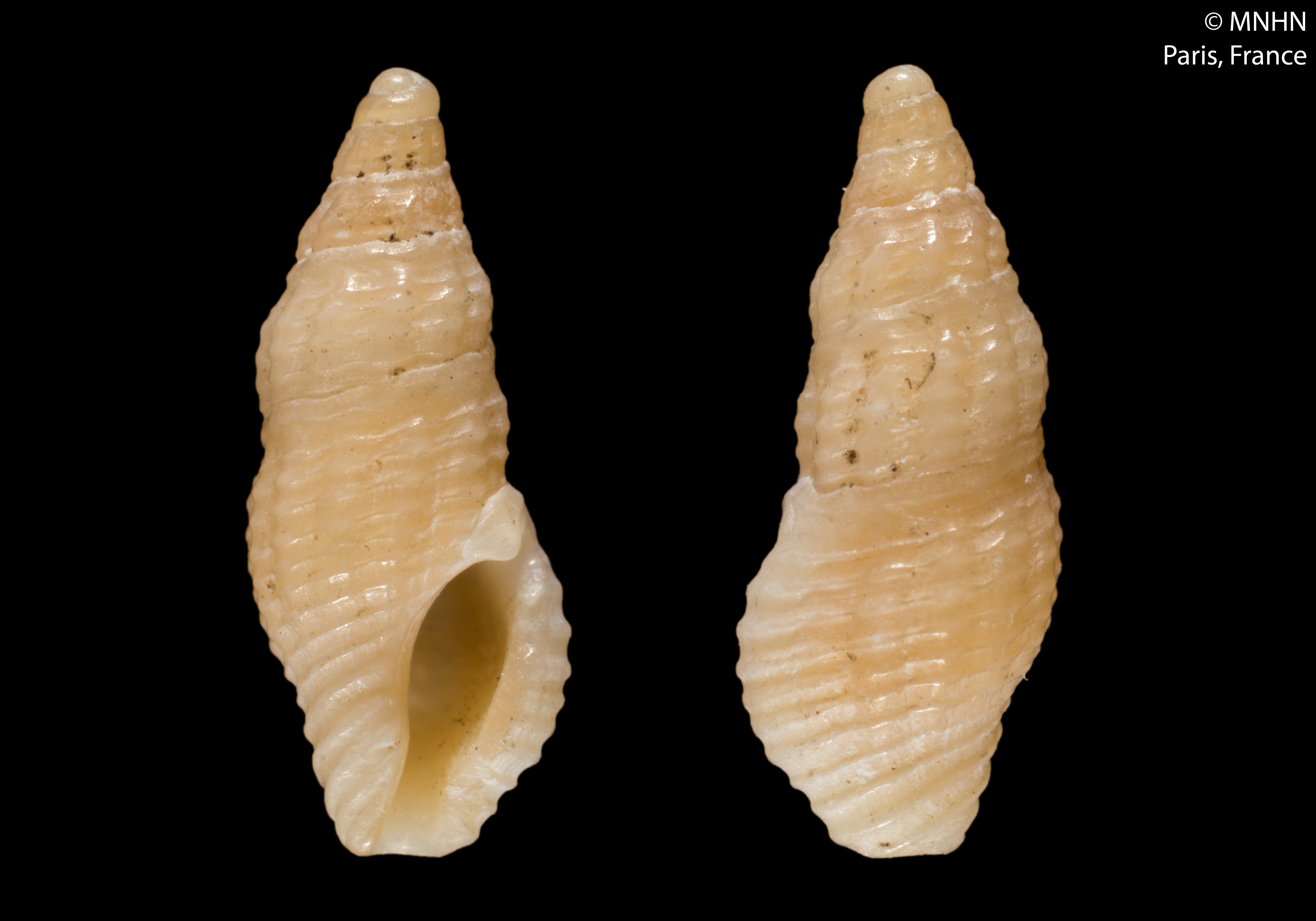
- Otitoma carnicolor (specimen in MNHN, Paris)

Scientific classification
- Kingdom: Animalia
- Phylum: Mollusca
- Class: Gastropoda
- Subclass: Caenogastropoda
- Order: Neogastropoda
- Superfamily: Conoidea
- Family: Pseudomelatomidae
- Genus: Otitoma
- Species: O. carnicolor

Binomial name
- Otitoma carnicolor (Hervier, 1896)

Synonyms
- Drillia carnicolor Hervier, 1896 (original combination); Thelecytharella carnicolor (Hervier, 1896); Turris (Inquisitor) carnicola (Hervier, 1896)

= Otitoma carnicolor =

Species of gastropod

Otitoma carnicolor is a species of sea snail, a marine gastropod mollusk in the family Pseudomelatomidae.

== Description ==
The length of the shell varies between 6 mm and 8 mm.

(Original description in Latin) The landeolate shell is small, and stout, and is orange‑flesh in colour. It has six whorls, of which one and a half are embryonic; the apex is mamillate, smooth, and shining. The whorls are convex and are somewhat compressed by a rather thick suture. They are sculptured with slightly oblique longitudinal folds, which are crossed in a wavy fashion by elevated spiral striae. On the body whorl the folds fade out below the midline, while the spiral striae run obliquely down toward the base and there become stronger.

The aperture is narrow and elliptical, smooth within and of the same colour as the exterior. The columella is only slightly arched and passes obliquely into a very short siphonal canal; its upper part is tuberculate. The outer lip is thickened over the last, stronger costal fold and projects into the aperture, being moderately sharp at the edge. The sinus lies just below the suture, is obliquely open, somewhat rounded, and whitish.

== Distribution ==
This marine species occurs off the Loyalty Islands and New Caledonia.
