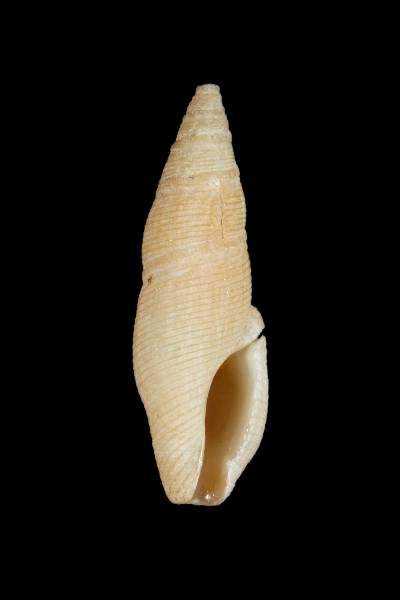
- Shell of Otitoma cyclophora (specimen at MNHN, Paris)

Scientific classification
- Kingdom: Animalia
- Phylum: Mollusca
- Class: Gastropoda
- Subclass: Caenogastropoda
- Order: Neogastropoda
- Superfamily: Conoidea
- Family: Pseudomelatomidae
- Genus: Otitoma
- Species: O. cyclophora

Binomial name
- Otitoma cyclophora (Deshayes, 1863)

Synonyms
- Antimitra crenulata (Pease, 1868); Clathurella cyclophora (Deshayes, 1863); Daphnella (Hemidaphne) cyclophora (Deshayes, 1863); Daphnella crenulata Pease, 1868; Daphnella cyclophora (Deshayes, 1863); Hemidaphne cyclophora (Deshayes, 1863); Mangelia cyclophora von Martens, 1880; Mitrellatoma mitra Kilburn, 1986; Otitoma crenulata Pease, 1868; Otitoma ottitoma Jousseaume, 1898; Pleurotoma cyclophora Deshayes, 1863 (basionym); Thelecytharella mitra (Kilburn, 1986)

= Otitoma cyclophora =

Species of gastropod

Otitoma cyclophora is a species of sea snail, a marine gastropod mollusk in the family Pseudomelatomidae, the turrids and allies.

== Description ==
The length of the shell varies between 6 mm and 13 mm.

The white shell is elongate, slender and cylindrical. It is transversely finely ridged, interstices striated transversely, longitudinally faintly and obsoletely irregularly ribbed. The sutures are bordered on each side by a crenulated rib, the crenulations connected obliquely by a small ridge. The aperture is rather short. The sinus is broad and deep.

== Distribution ==
This marine species is occurs in the Red Sea; also off Northern Mozambique; the Mascarenes; Queensland, Australia, French Polynesia, the Philippines and Japan
