= Otitoma crassivaricosa =

Scientific classification
- Kingdom: Animalia
- Phylum: Mollusca
- Class: Gastropoda
- Subclass: Caenogastropoda
- Order: Neogastropoda
- Superfamily: Conoidea
- Family: Pseudomelatomidae
- Genus: Otitoma
- Species: O. crassivaricosa

Binomial name
- Otitoma crassivaricosa Morassi, Nappo & Bonfitto, 2017

Species of gastropod

Otitoma crassivaricosa is a species of sea snail, a marine gastropod mollusc in the family Pseudomelatomidae, the turrids and allies.

== Description ==
The length of the shell varies between 9 mm and 11.3 mm.

== Distribution ==
This marine species occurs in the Pacific Ocean off the Fiji Islands and the Marquesas.
