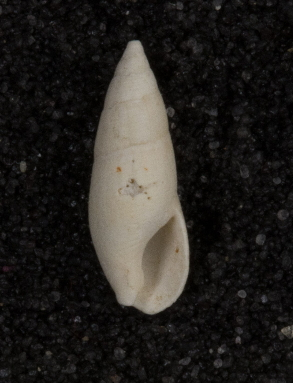
- Shell of Aesopus chrysalloideus (specimen at the Paleontological Research Institution)

Scientific classification
- Kingdom: Animalia
- Phylum: Mollusca
- Class: Gastropoda
- Subclass: Caenogastropoda
- Order: Neogastropoda
- Family: Columbellidae
- Genus: Aesopus
- Species: A. chrysalloideus

Binomial name
- Aesopus chrysalloideus (P. P. Carpenter, 1864)
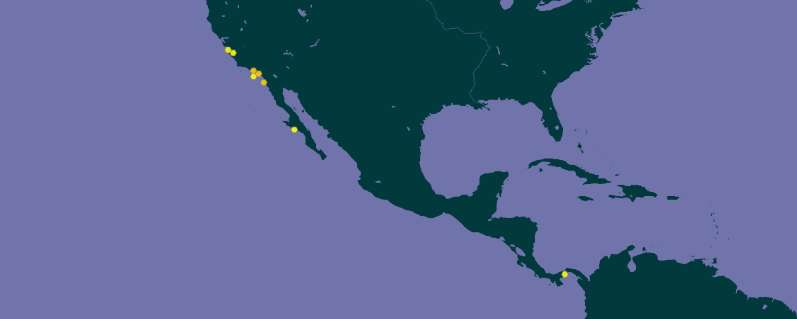

Synonyms
- † Aesopus idae Bartsch, 1918; Amycla chrysalloidea P. P. Carpenter, 1864 (original combination)

= Aesopus chrysalloideus =

Species of gastropod

Aesopus chrysalloideus is a species of sea snail, a marine gastropod mollusk in the family Columbellidae, the dove snails.

== Description ==
The length of the shell attains 12.5 mm, its diameter 4.5 mm.

(Described as † Aesopus idae) The conical shell is very elongate, increasing regularly in size. The specimen has seven remaining whorls, with the extreme tip missing. The whorls of the protoconch are decollated. The teleoconch whorls are relatively high between the sutures, with a narrowly tabulated shoulder at the summit. The whorls are marked by irregular, retractively slanting growth lines, which are accentuated in the type specimen due to weathering of the specimen. Although there are indications of sculpture on the spire, the specimen is too worn to confirm this detail.

The base is protracted, with the anterior portion marked by the continuation of strong growth lines and indications of robust spiral lirations. The aperture is oval and distinctly channeled anteriorly, with an acute posterior angle. The outer lip is relatively thick. The inner lip is sigmoid, reflected over, and appressed to the base. The parietal wall is covered by a thick callus.

== Distribution ==
This marine species occurs off San Diego, California, USA.

Fossils were found in Quaternary strata in California.
