= Otitoma neocaledonica =

Scientific classification
- Kingdom: Animalia
- Phylum: Mollusca
- Class: Gastropoda
- Subclass: Caenogastropoda
- Order: Neogastropoda
- Superfamily: Conoidea
- Family: Pseudomelatomidae
- Genus: Otitoma
- Species: O. neocaledonica

Binomial name
- Otitoma neocaledonica Morassi, Andrea Nappo & Bonfitto, 2017

Species of gastropod

Otitoma neocaledonica is a species of sea snail, a marine gastropod mollusk in the family Pseudomelatomidae, the turrids and allies.

== Description ==
The length of the shell varies between 5.5 mm and 8.2 mm.

== Distribution ==
This marine species occurs in the Pacific Ocean off the New Caledonia.
