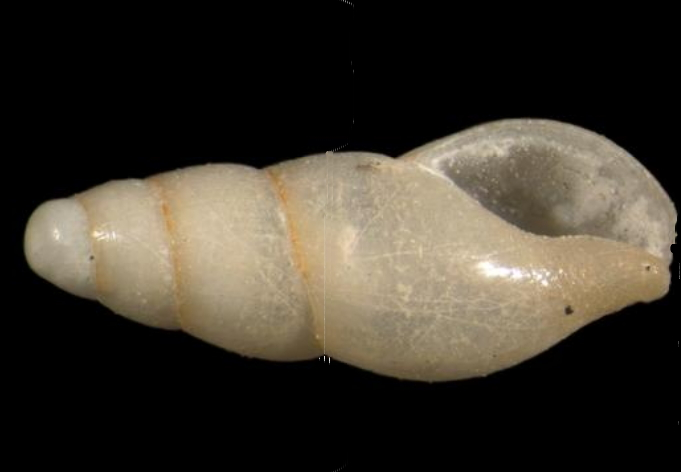
- Shell of Aesopus jaffaensis (specimen at the Australian Museum)

Scientific classification
- Kingdom: Animalia
- Phylum: Mollusca
- Class: Gastropoda
- Subclass: Caenogastropoda
- Order: Neogastropoda
- Family: Columbellidae
- Genus: Aesopus
- Species: A. jaffaensis

Binomial name
- Aesopus jaffaensis (Verco, 1910)
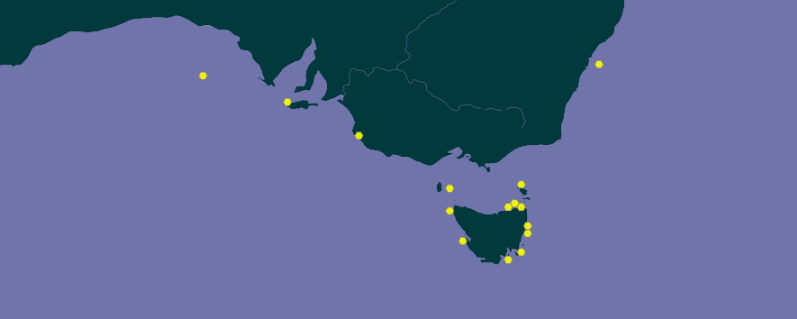

Synonyms
- Pyrene jaffaensis Verco, 1910 (original combination)

= Aesopus jaffaensis =

Species of gastropod

Aesopus jaffaensis is a species of sea snail, a marine gastropod mollusc in the family Columbellidae, the dove snails.

== Description ==
The length of the shell attains 5.9 mm, its diameter 2.2 mm.

(Original description) The shell is cylindrically fusiform with a blunt protoconch consisting of one and a half subconvex, smooth whorls, ending abruptly with a scar. The teleoconch has four subconvex whorls with distinct, subcanaliculate sutures. These sutures are very narrowly marginate and ascend near the aperture. The body whorl is oval and is somewhat compressed at the base. The aperture is oval, narrowing posteriorly, with a wide, notched siphonal canal. The outer lip is thin, simple, and slightly excavated in the infractural area. The columella is curved and obtusely angled at the sinistrally directed canal. The surface of the shell is smooth, except for minute sublenticular axial and longitudinal crowded scratches.

== Distribution ==
This marine species occurs off South Australia and Tasmania.
