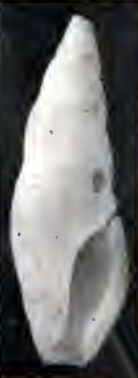
- Otitoma gouldi shell

Scientific classification
- Kingdom: Animalia
- Phylum: Mollusca
- Class: Gastropoda
- Subclass: Caenogastropoda
- Order: Neogastropoda
- Superfamily: Conoidea
- Family: Pseudomelatomidae
- Genus: Otitoma; Jousseaume, 1898

Type species
- Otitoma ottitoma Jousseaume, 1898

Synonyms
- Austropusilla (Metaclathurella) Shuto, 1983; Lioglyphostomella Shuto, 1970; † Euclathurella (Thelecytharella) Shuto, 1969; Thelecytharella Shuto, 1969

= Otitoma =

Genus of gastropods

Otitoma is a genus of sea snails, marine gastropod mollusks in the family Pseudomelatomidae.

This genus consists of species with a rather variable appearance. Their different morphology points to an uncommon diversification.

== Taxonomy ==
This genus was considered a nomen dubium by Powell in 1966, until Kilburn resurrected it in 2004. He considered Thelecytharella a synonym of Otitoma. Finally in 2011 Bouchet et al. closed the debate about this genera based on molecular evidence and assigned Otitoma to the family Pseudomelatomidae.

== Species ==
Species within the genus Otitoma include:

- Otitoma astrolabensis Wiedrick, 2014
- Otitoma aureolineata Stahlschmidt, Poppe & Tagaro, 2018
- Otitoma batjanensis (Schepman, 1913)
- Otitoma boucheti Morassi, Nappo & Bonfitto, 2017
- Otitoma carnicolor (Hervier, 1896)
- Otitoma crassivaricosa Morassi, Nappo & Bonfitto, 2017
- Otitoma crokerensis (Shuto, 1983)
- Otitoma cyclophora (Deshayes, 1863)
- Otitoma deluta (Gould, 1860)
- Otitoma elegans Morassi, Nappo & Bonfitto, 2017
- Otitoma fergusoni Wiedrick, 2014
- Otitoma gouldi (Yen, 1944)
- Otitoma hadra Morassi, Nappo & Bonfitto, 2017
- Otitoma jennyae Stahlschmidt, Poppe & Tagaro, 2018
- † Otitoma kagoshimaensis (Shuto, 1965)
- Otitoma kecil (Sysoev, 1997)
- Otitoma kwandangensis (Schepman, 1913)
- Otitoma lirata (Reeve, 1845)
- Otitoma metuloides (Kilburn, 1995)
- Otitoma neocaledonica Morassi, Nappo & Bonfitto, 2017
- Otitoma nereidum Morassi, Nappo & Bonfitto, 2017
- Otitoma oneili (Barnard, 1958)
- † Otitoma oyamai (Shuto, 1965)
- Otitoma philippinensis Morassi, Nappo & Bonfitto, 2017
- Otitoma philpoppei Morassi, Nappo & Bonfitto, 2017
- Otitoma pictolabra Stahlschmidt, Poppe & Tagaro, 2018
- Otitoma porcellana Stahlschmidt, Poppe & Tagaro, 2018
- Otitoma rubiginosa (Hinds, 1843)
- Otitoma rubiginostoma Morassi, Nappo & Bonfitto, 2017
- Otitoma sororcula Morassi, Nappo & Bonfitto, 2017
- Otitoma timorensis (Schepman, 1913)
- Otitoma tropispira Morassi, Nappo & Bonfitto, 2017
- Otitoma vitrea (Reeve, 1845)
- Otitoma wiedricki Stahlschmidt, Poppe & Tagaro, 2018
- Otitoma xantholineata Morassi, Nappo & Bonfitto, 2017

Species brought into synonymy

- Otitoma crenulata Pease, 1868: synonym of Otitoma cyclophora (Deshayes, 1863)
- Otitoma mitra (Kilburn, 1986): synonym of Otitoma cyclophora (Deshayes, 1863)
- Otitoma ottitoma Jousseaume, 1898: synonym of Otitoma cyclophora (Deshayes, 1863)
