= Otitoma crokerensis =

Scientific classification
- Kingdom: Animalia
- Phylum: Mollusca
- Class: Gastropoda
- Subclass: Caenogastropoda
- Order: Neogastropoda
- Superfamily: Conoidea
- Family: Pseudomelatomidae
- Genus: Otitoma
- Species: O. crokerensis

Binomial name
- Otitoma crokerensis (Shuto, 1983)

Synonyms
- Austropusilla (Metaclathurella) crokerensis Shuto, 1983 (original combination); Thelecytharella crokerensis (Shuto, 1983)

Species of gastropod

Otitoma crokerensis is a species of sea snail (which are marine gastropod mollusks) in the family Pseudomelatomidae (the turrids and allies.)

== Description ==
Otitoma crokerensis' shells are white-light peach, and attain a length of up to 8 inches.

== Distribution ==
This marine species is found off of Croker Island, Northern Territory; Australia.
