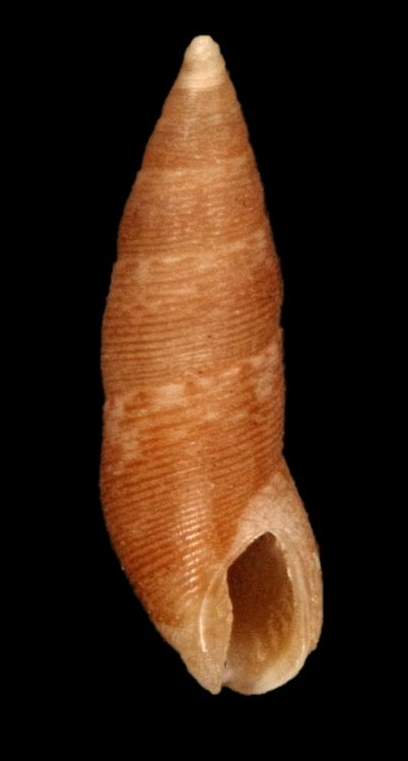
- Shell of Aesopus stearnsii (specimen at Naturalis Biodiversity Center)

Scientific classification
- Kingdom: Animalia
- Phylum: Mollusca
- Class: Gastropoda
- Subclass: Caenogastropoda
- Order: Neogastropoda
- Family: Columbellidae
- Genus: Aesopus
- Species: A. stearnsii

Binomial name
- Aesopus stearnsii (Tryon, 1883)
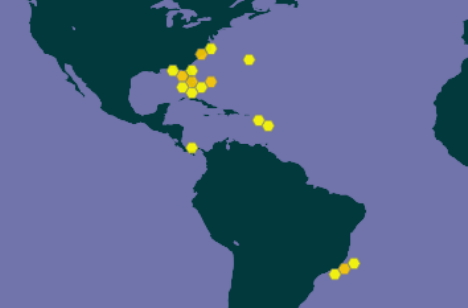

Synonyms
- Columbella (Seminella) stearnsii Tryon, 1883 (basionym); Columbella stearnsii Tryon, 1883 (original combination); Nitidella filosa Stearns, 1873

= Aesopus stearnsii =

Species of gastropod

Aesopus stearnsii, common name Stearn's dove shell, is a species of sea snail, a marine gastropod mollusk in the family Columbellidae, the dove snails.

== Description ==
(Original description) The elongate shell features five slightly convex whorls and a yellowish-brown latticed surface adorned with many fine, revolving spiral threads and microscopic axial ribs. The outer lip is simple and with spiral ridges on the inside.

== Distribution ==
This species occurs in the Atlantic Ocean from North Carolina to western Florida, USA; also off Bermuda and the Bahamas, Brazil; in the Caribbean Sea off Guadeloupe.
