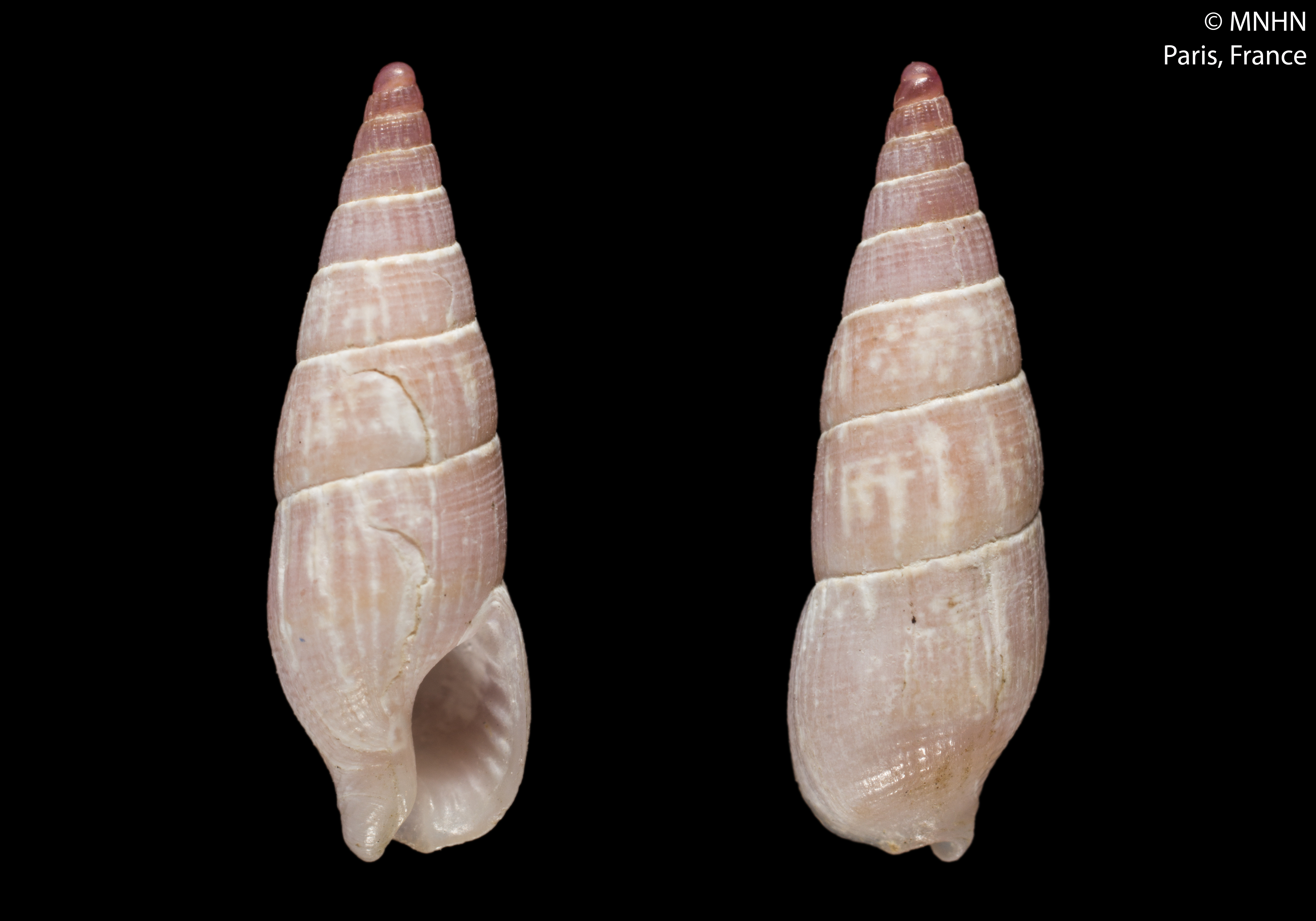
- Shell of Aesopus clausiliformis (syntype at MNHN, Paris)

Scientific classification
- Kingdom: Animalia
- Phylum: Mollusca
- Class: Gastropoda
- Subclass: Caenogastropoda
- Order: Neogastropoda
- Family: Columbellidae
- Genus: Aesopus
- Species: A. clausiliformis

Binomial name
- Aesopus clausiliformis (Kiener, 1834)
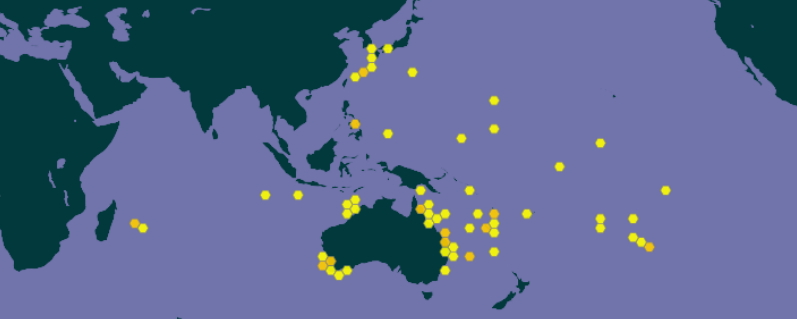

Synonyms
- Aesopus clausilia Duclos, P.L. in Chenu, J.C., 1846; Aesopus cumingi var. queenslandicus Hedley, 1913; Aesopus spiculus (Duclos, 1846); Buccinum clausiliforme Kiener, 1834 (basionym); Columbella clausilia Duclos, 1846; Columbella cumingii Martens, E.C. von, 1880; Columbella spicula Duclos, 1846

= Aesopus clausiliformis =

Species of gastropod

Aesopus clausiliformis is a species of sea snail, a marine gastropod mollusk in the family Columbellidae, the dove snails.

== Description ==
The size of an adult shell varies between 10 mm and 15 mm.

The small, spindle-shaped shell boasts a chestnut hue. It is covered with numerous fine, transverse striations. The spire comprises nine slightly convex whorls, with the upper ones featuring longitudinal plaiting. The sutures are quite prominent, bordered by small, elongated black and white spots. The brownish aperture is narrow and ovate. The outer lip is thin, delicately striated within, while the columella is slightly arcuate and smooth, forming a small siphonal canal that is emarginated at its base.

== Distribution ==
This species occurs in the Indian Ocean off Mauritius and Réunion; in the Pacific Ocean off the Philippines, Taiwan, Japan, Kiribati, the Marshall Islands, French Polynesia; in Oceania off Vanuatu; also off Australia.
