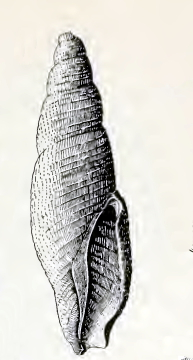
- Original image of a shell of Austropusilla hilum

Scientific classification
- Kingdom: Animalia
- Phylum: Mollusca
- Class: Gastropoda
- Subclass: Caenogastropoda
- Order: Neogastropoda
- Superfamily: Conoidea
- Family: Raphitomidae
- Genus: Austropusilla
- Species: A. hilum

Binomial name
- Austropusilla hilum (Hedley, 1908)

Synonyms
- Filodrillia hilum (Hedley, 1908); Mangelia hilum Hedley, 1908 (original combination)

= Austropusilla hilum =

Species of gastropod

Austropusilla hilum is a species of sea snail, a marine gastropod mollusk in the family Raphitomidae.

== Description ==
The length of the shell attains 3.85 mm, its diameter 1.25 mm.

(Original description by Hedley) The minute shell is acicular and thin. Its colour is amber-brown, passing to purple on the apex. It contains five whorls, wound obliquely. The first whorl is minute, the last measures two-thirds of the whole shell. The sculpture consists of fine spiral grooves which become more crowded anteriorly. The aperture is long and narrow, suddenly contracted anteriorly. The sinus is deeply excavate. A thin sheet of callus is spread on the columella. The siphonal canal is broad, short and a little recurved.

== Distribution ==
This marine species is endemic to Australia and occurs off New South Wales and Tasmania and Victoria.
