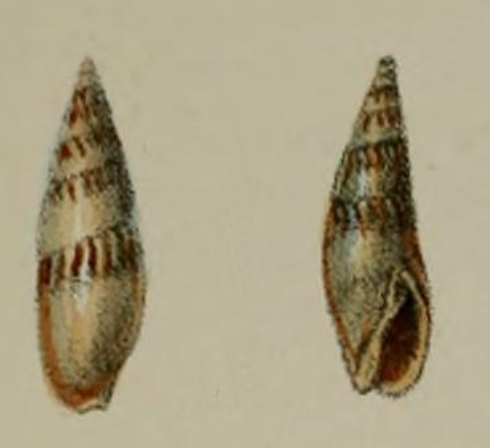
- Shell of Aesopus australis (holotype)

Scientific classification
- Kingdom: Animalia
- Phylum: Mollusca
- Class: Gastropoda
- Subclass: Caenogastropoda
- Order: Neogastropoda
- Family: Columbellidae
- Genus: Aesopus
- Species: A. australis

Binomial name
- Aesopus australis (Angas, 1877)

Synonyms
- Laevisopus australis (Angas, 1877).; Truncaria australis Angas, 1877 (original combination)

= Aesopus australis =

Species of gastropod

Aesopus australis is a species of sea snail, a marine gastropod mollusk in the family Columbellidae, the dove snails.

== Description ==
(Original description) The shell is elongate and fusiform, moderately solid, and pale brown with a shining surface. It consists of 7½ whorls, with the two apical whorls being thin and papillose. The remaining whorls feature somewhat distant, flat longitudinal plications on the upper portion, crossed by fine impressed lines. The middle of the body whorl is smooth, with a few impressed lines near the base. The sutures are grooved. The aperture is narrowly ovate and dilated below. The outer lip is arcuate and slightly thickened within. The columella is somewhat flattened, covered with a smooth, white callus, and is abruptly truncate at the base.

== Distribution ==
This marine species is endemic to Australia and occurs off New South Wales, South Australia and Victoria.
