= Aesopus eurytoides =

Scientific classification
- Kingdom: Animalia
- Phylum: Mollusca
- Class: Gastropoda
- Subclass: Caenogastropoda
- Order: Neogastropoda
- Family: Columbellidae
- Genus: Aesopus
- Species: A. eurytoides

Binomial name
- Aesopus eurytoides (P. P. Carpenter, 1864)

Synonyms
- Aesopus eurytoideus [sic] (misspelling); Truncaria eurytoides P. P. Carpenter, 1864 superseded combination

Species of gastropod

Aesopus eurytoides is a species of sea snail, a marine gastropod mollusk in the family Columbellidae, the dove snails.

== Description ==
(Original description in Latin) The turreted shell is small and slender, and has a whitish coloration. Often, a band around the periphery is adorned with brownish-orange spots. The nuclear whorls are mammillate, effused, flattened, and slightly constricted towards the end. The ribs are shiny and wax-like. The aperture is evanescent and is sub-square, with a lip that is not thickened and sometimes finely striated inside, not denticulate. The columella is abruptly truncated.

== Distribution ==
This marine species occurs off Cape San Lucas, Mexico.
