= Aliguay =

Island in Dapitan, Philippines

Aliguay Island
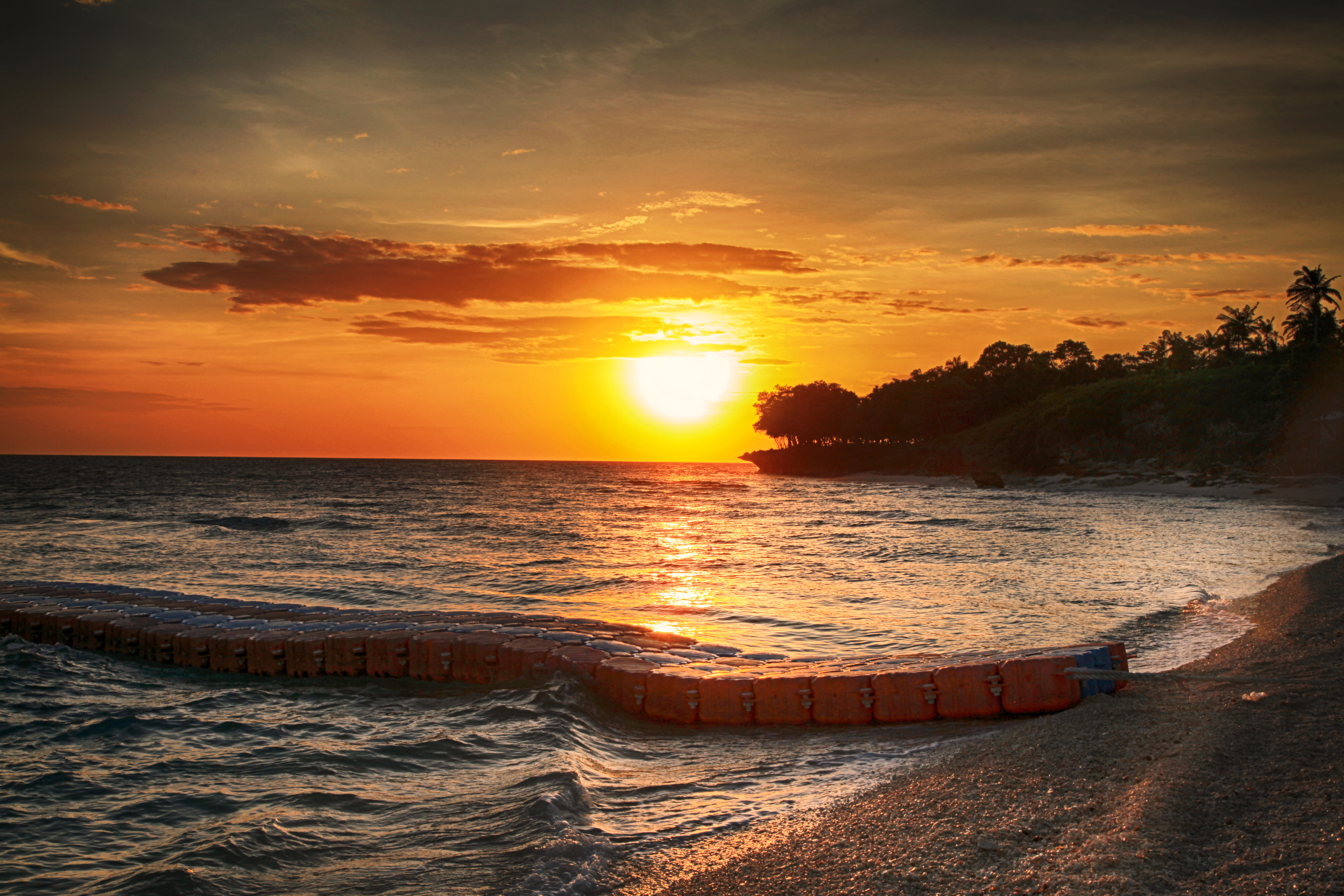
- Aliguay sunset

- Location within Philippines

Geography
- Coordinates: 8°44′48″N 123°13′26″E
- Adjacent to: Bohol Sea; Sulu Sea

Administration
- Philippines
- Region: Zamboanga Peninsula
- Province: Zamboanga del Norte
- City: Dapitan

Demographics
- Population: 601 (2024 census)

Additional information

Aliguay is an island in the Philippines, and a barangay of Dapitan. The island is an established marine sanctuary. The island is surrounded by white sand beaches and coral reefs. There are no water sources on the island. A few residents live on Aliguay Island, mostly selling fish to tourists.

== 2015 Kidnapping and Beheading ==
More than 10 armed men abducted at dawn Monday, May 4, 2015. Rodolfo Buligao, Aliguay's Barangay Captain at the time, and two members of the Philippine Coast Guard were kidnapped by the Abu Sayyaf. The suspects turned to these 3 men after failing to see foreign tourists in what could have been a plan for kidnapping-for-ransom. The military found a beheaded body of a man believed to be Buligao. It was spotted along an intersection in Barangay Laum Maimbung, Maimbung town, Province of Sulu.

== Demographics ==
Population census of Aliguay
Year	Pop.	±% p.a.
2010	447	—
2015	682	+8.38%
2020	720	+1.15%
2024	601	−4.24%
Source: Philippine Statistics Authority

== See also ==
- List of islands of the Philippines
