= List of gastropods described in 2017 =

This list of gastropods described in 2017 is a list of new taxa of snails and slugs of every kind that have been described (following the rules of the ICZN) during the year 2017. The list only includes taxa at the rank of genus or species. For changes in taxonomy above the level of genus, see Changes in the taxonomy of gastropods since 2005.

== Marine gastropods ==
=== New species ===
==== Neomphalina ====
- Dracogyra subfuscus Chen, Zhou, Wang & Copley, 2017
- Lamellomphalus manusensis Zhang & Zhang, 2017
- Lirapex politus Chen, Zhou, Wang & Copley, 2017

==== Vetigastropoda ====
- Emarginula poppeorum Romani & Crocetta in Romani, Rolán, Simone & Crocetta, 2017
- Perotrochus sunderlandorum Petuch & Berschauer, 2017
- Margarites manusensis Zhang & Zhang, 2017
- Margarites similis Zhang & Zhang, 2017
- Turbo sazae Fukuda, 2017

==== Neritimorpha ====
- Neritilia abeli Espinosa, Ortea & Diez-García, 2017
- Neritilia serrana Espinosa, Ortea & Diez-García, 2017

==== Caenogastropoda ====
- Alvania marmarisensis Bitlis & Öztürk, 2017
- Athleta easoni Petuch & Berschauer, 2017
- Microliotia rehderi Kase & Raines, 2017
- Scalaronoba arenula Stephens & Vafiadis, 2017
- Scalaronoba kryptopleurakia Stephens & Vafiadis, 2017

==== Littorinimorpha ====
- Caecum codoceoae Gálvez & Huidobro, 2017
- Circuitus caledonicus Rubio & Rolán, 2017
- Circuitus medius Rubio & Rolán, 2017
- Circuitus monoplanes Rubio & Rolán, 2017
- Circuitus philippinensis Rubio & Rolán, 2017
- Circuitus solomonensis Rubio & Rolán, 2017
- Circuitus vanuatuensis Rubio & Rolán, 2017
- Cleovitrina andreiae Fehse & Grego, 2017
- Novastoa rapaitiensis Schiaparelli, Bieler, Golding, Rawlings & Collins, 2017
- Simnialena paita Fehse, 2017
- Thylacodes vandyensis Bieler, Rawlings & Collins in Bieler et al., 2017

==== Neogastropoda ====
- Aesopus foucherae Lussi, 2017
- Africonus freitasi Tenorio, Afonso, Rolán, Pires, Vasconcelos, Abalde & Zardoya, 2017
- Agathotoma guadalupensis Espinosa & Ortea in Espinosa, Ortea & Moro, 2017
- Alisimitra barazeri Fedosov, Herrmann & Bouchet, 2017
- Alisimitra deforgesi Fedosov, Herrmann & Bouchet, 2017
- Alisimitra samadiae Fedosov, Herrmann & Bouchet, 2017
- Antimitrella convexa Lussi, 2017
- Antimitrella kublai Lussi, 2017
- Antimitrella plana Lussi, 2017
- Antimitrella slateri Lussi, 2017
- Bactrocythara cubana Espinosa, Ortea & Moro, 2017
- Calagrassor analogus Fraussen, Chino & Stahlschmidt, 2017
- Calagrassor hagai Fraussen, Chino & Stahlschmidt, 2017
- Coralliophila curacaoensis Potkamp & Hoeksema in Potkamp, Vermeij & Hoeksema, 2017
- Costoanachis alcazari Ortea & Espinosa, 2017
- Costoanachis aurea Lussi, 2017
- Costoanachis calidoscopio Espinosa, Ortea & Diez García, 2017
- Costoanachis jeffreysbayensis Lussi, 2017
- Crassispira aurea Kantor, Stahlschmidt, Aznar-Cormano, Bouchet & Puillandre, 2017
- Crassispira procera Kantor, Stahlschmidt, Aznar-Cormano, Bouchet & Puillandre, 2017
- Crassispira scala Kantor, Stahlschmidt, Aznar-Cormano, Bouchet & Puillandre, 2017
- Curtitoma georgоssiani Merkuljev, 2017
- Decipifus fenestratus Lussi, 2017
- Domiporta valdacantamessae Maxwell, Dekkers, Berschauer & Congdon, 2017
- Eratoidea madinina Espinosa & Ortea, 2017
- Eratoidea orbignyana Espinosa & Ortea, 2017
- Favartia lafayettei Espinosa & Ortea, 2017
- Favartia martinicaensis Espinosa & Ortea, 2017
- Fusiconus levenensis Monnier & Tenorio, 2017
- Fusinus bishopi Petuch, Berschauer & Waller, 2017
- Gibberula aurelieae Ortea, 2017
- Gibberula madbelono Ortea, 2017
- Gibberula mapipi Ortea, 2017
- Hastula engi Malcom & Terryn, 2017
- Hemilienardia acinonyx Fedosov, Stahlschmidt, Puillandre, Aznar-Cormano & Bouchet, 2017
- Hemilienardia lynx Fedosov, Stahlschmidt, Puillandre, Aznar-Cormano & Bouchet, 2017
- Hemilienardia pardus Fedosov, Stahlschmidt, Puillandre, Aznar-Cormano & Bouchet, 2017
- Hyalina bonjour Ortea & Espinosa, 2017
- Hyalina egregia Espinosa, Ortea & Diez García, 2017
- Hyalina fortsaintlouis Ortea & Espinosa, 2017
- Inquisitor ritae Stahlschmidt & Fraussen, 2017
- Jaspidiconus carvalhoi Petuch & Berschauer, 2017
- Jaspidiconus ferreirai Petuch & Berschauer, 2017
- Jaspidiconus lindapowersae Petuch & Berschauer, 2017
- Kanamarua wangae Monsecour, Fraussen & Fei, 2017
- Kioconus sakalava Monnier & Tenorio, 2017
- Mitrella millardi Lussi, 2017
- Mitromorpha jaguaense Espinosa & Ortea, 2017
- Mitromorpha sanctaluciaensis Espinosa & Ortea, 2017
- Nannodiella baracoesa Espinosa, Ortea & Moro, 2017
- Nannodiella cubadiella Espinosa, Ortea & Moro, 2017
- Neocancilla madagascariensis Herrmann, 2017
- Otitoma boucheti Morassi, Nappo & Bonfitto, 2017
- Otitoma crassivaricosa Morassi, Nappo & Bonfitto, 2017
- Otitoma elegans Morassi, Nappo & Bonfitto, 2017
- Otitoma hadra Morassi, Nappo & Bonfitto, 2017
- Otitoma neocaledonica Morassi, Nappo & Bonfitto, 2017
- Otitoma nereidum Morassi, Nappo & Bonfitto, 2017
- Otitoma philippinensis Morassi, Nappo & Bonfitto, 2017
- Otitoma philpoppei Morassi, Nappo & Bonfitto, 2017
- Otitoma rubiginostoma Morassi, Nappo & Bonfitto, 2017
- Otitoma sororcula Morassi, Nappo & Bonfitto, 2017
- Otitoma tropispira Morassi, Nappo & Bonfitto, 2017
- Otitoma xantholineata Morassi, Nappo & Bonfitto, 2017
- Parvanachis pepecarrascoi Ortea & Espinosa, 2017
- Phymorhynchus oculatus Zhang & Zhang, 2017
- Polystira cubacaribbaea Espinosa, Ortea & Moro, 2017
- Polystira eloinae Espinosa, Ortea & Moro, 2017
- Polystira jaguaella Espinosa, Ortea & Moro, 2017
- Polystira jiguaniensis Espinosa, Ortea & Moro, 2017
- Polystira juangrinensis Espinosa, Ortea & Moro, 2017
- Polystira parvula Espinosa, Ortea & Moro, 2017
- Pusia ivanmarrowi Marrow, 2017
- Pusia simoneae Marrow, 2017
- Pusia versicolor Marrow, 2017
- Pusia voluta Marrow, 2017
- Raphitoma ephesina Pusateri, Giannuzzi Savelli & Stahlschmidt, 2017
- Reticunassa annabolteae Galindo, Kool & Dekker, 2017
- Reticunassa goliath Galindo, Kool & Dekker, 2017
- Reticunassa intrudens Galindo, Kool & Dekker, 2017
- Reticunassa poppeorum Galindo, Kool & Dekker, 2017
- Reticunassa thailandensis Galindo, Kool & Dekker, 2017
- Reticunassa visayaensis Galindo, Kool & Dekker, 2017
- Siphonochelus mozambicus Houart, 2017
- Thaisella guatemalteca Simone, 2017
- Tritia djerbaensis Aissaoui, Galindo, Puillandre & Bouchet, 2017
- Tritia pallaryana Aissaoui, Galindo, Puillandre & Bouchet, 2017
- Virgiconus malabaricus Monnier, Limpalaër & Tenorio, 2017
- Volvarina granmaense Espinosa, Ortea & Diez García, 2017
- Volvarina jibara Espinosa, Ortea & Diez García, 2017
- Volvarina santacruzense Espinosa, Ortea & Diez García, 2017

==== Ptenoglossa ====
- Cirsotrema ctenodentatum Zelaya & Güller, 2017
- Cirsotrema georgeanum Zelaya & Güller, 2017
- Cirsotrema strebeli Zelaya & Güller, 2017
- Epitonium evanidstriatum Zelaya & Güller, 2017
- Palisadia rittneri Mienis, 2017

==== Heterobranchia ====
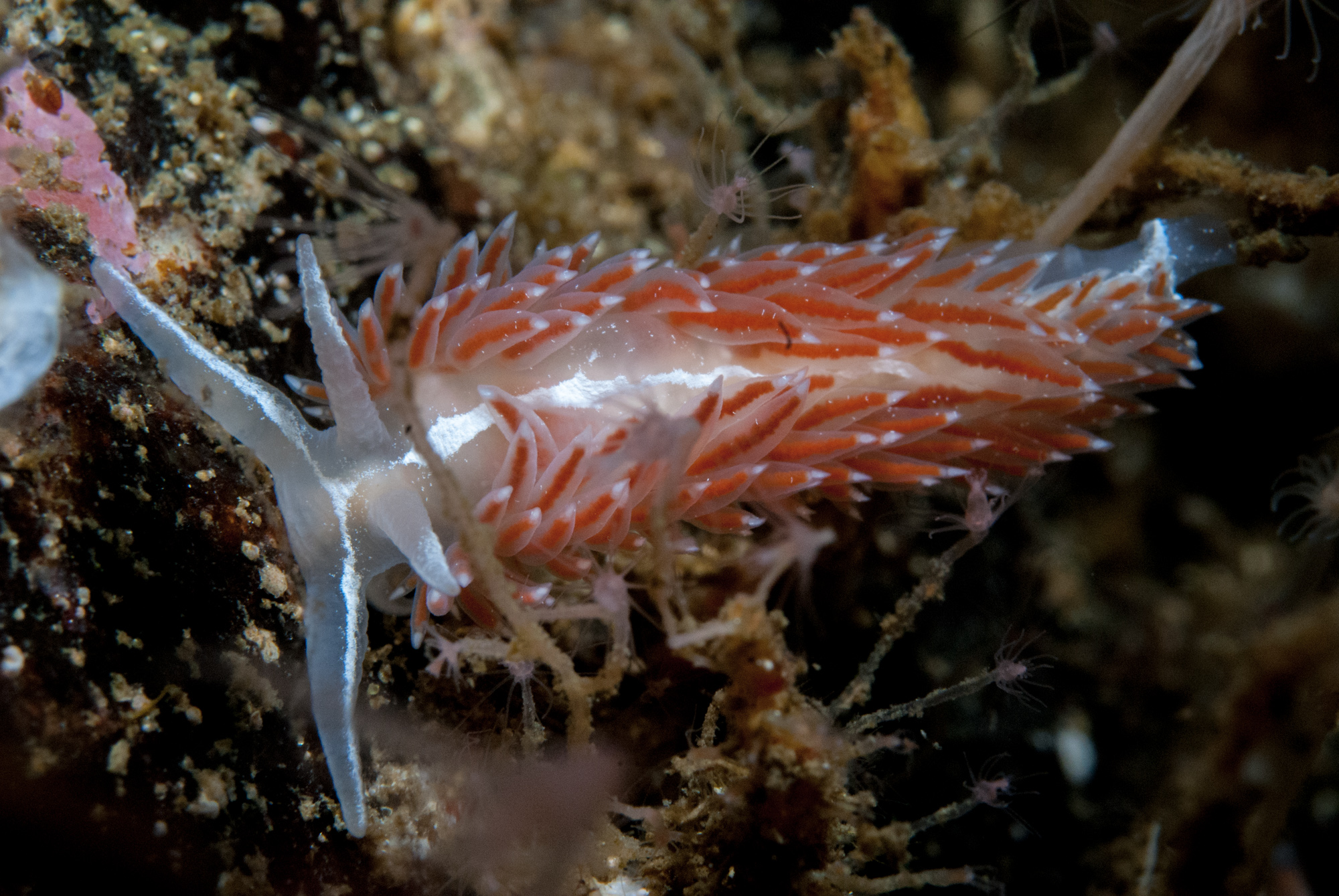
A live specimen of Gulenia monicae, from Norway

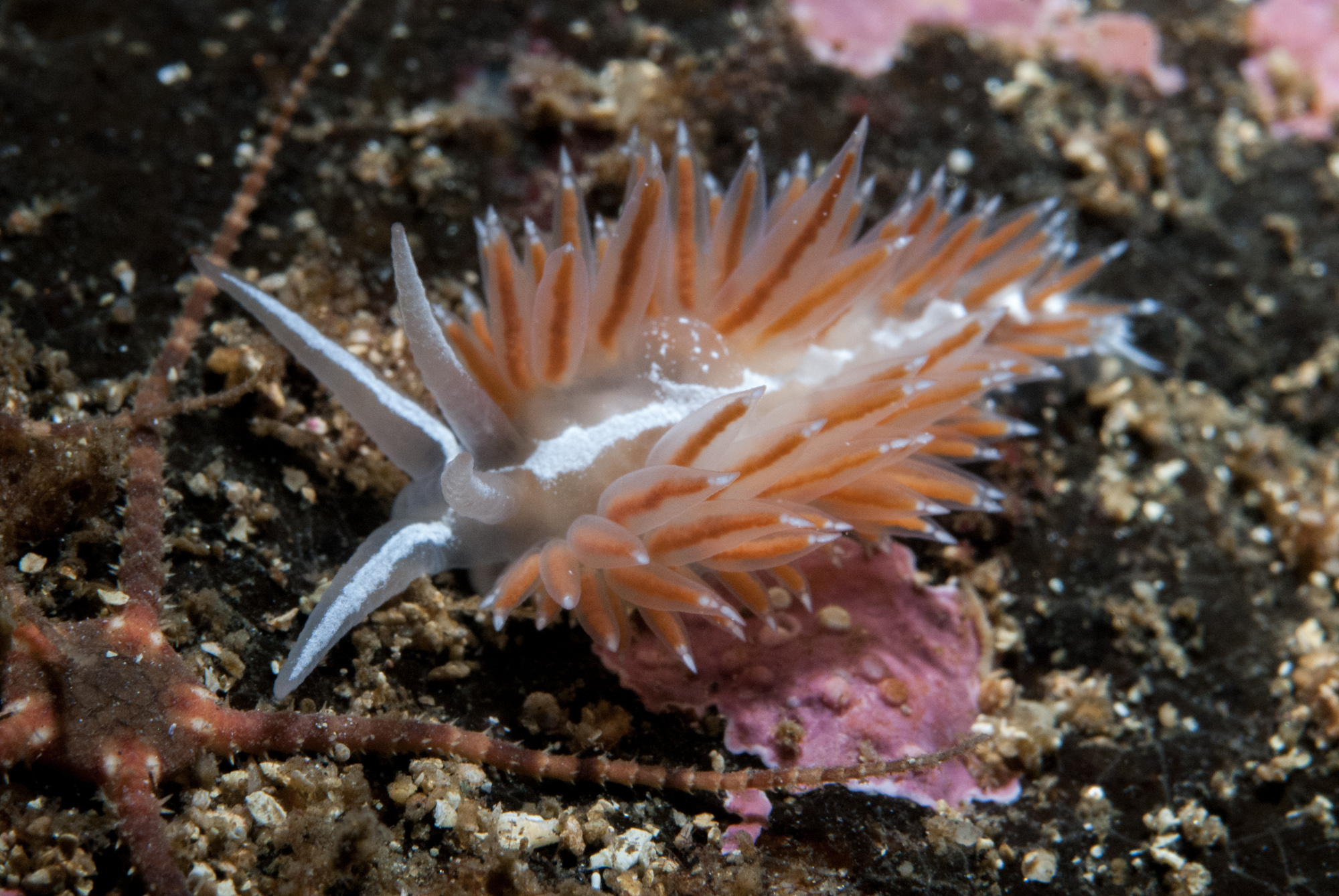
A live specimen of Gulenia orjani, from Norway

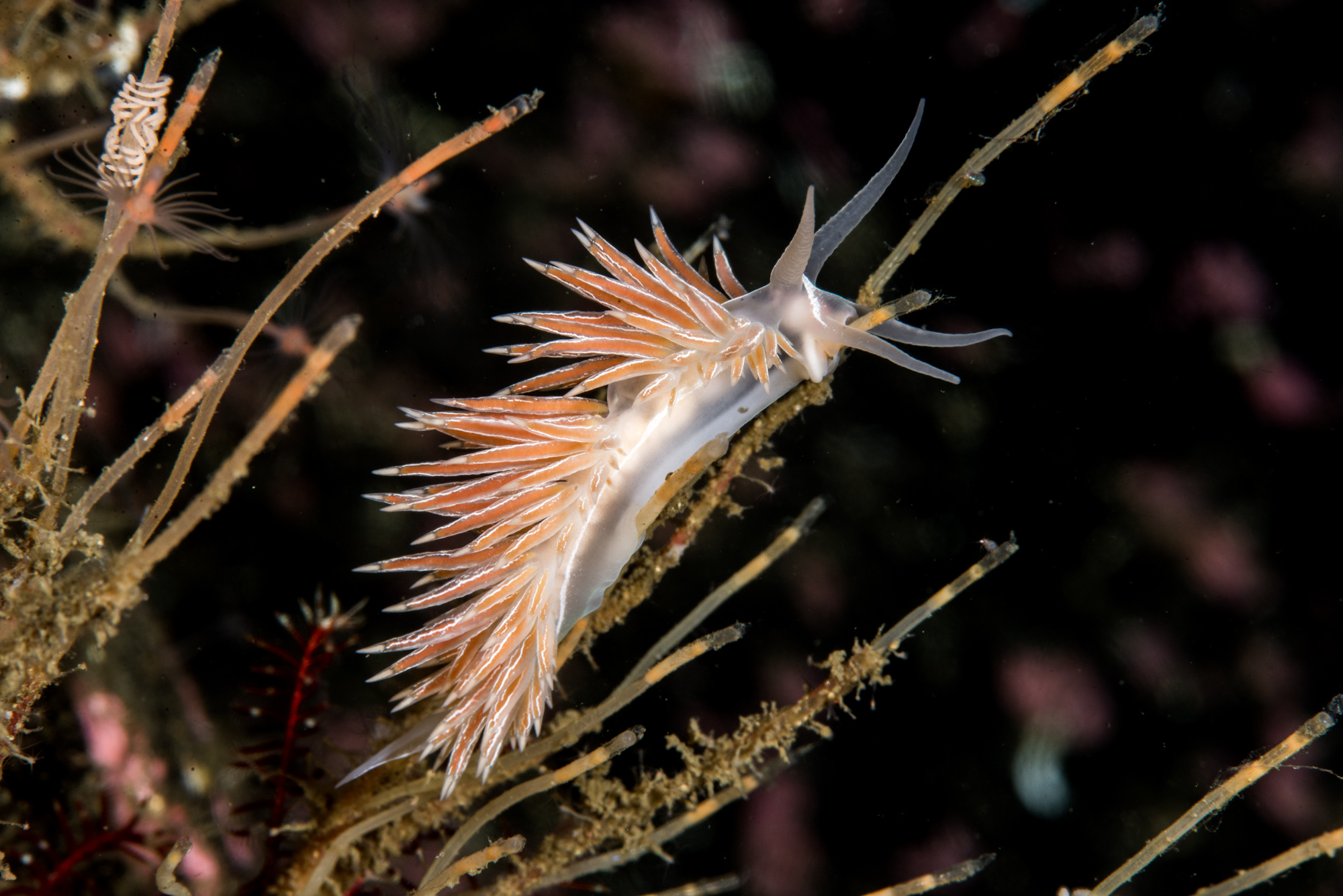
The nudibranch Fjordia chriskaugei at Gulen Dive Resort, Norway

- Acteon fasuloi Crocetta, Romani, Simone & Rolán in Romani, Rolán, Simone & Crocetta, 2017
- Adalaria rossica Martynov & Korshunova, 2017
- Adalaria ultima Martynov & Korshunova, 2017
- Aldisa fragaria Tibiriçá, Pola & Cervera, 2017
- Aldisa zavorensis Tibiriçá, Pola & Cervera, 2017
- Borealea sanamyanae Korshunova, Martynov, Bakken, Evertsen, Fletcher, Mudianta, Saito, Lundin, Schrödl & Picton, 2017
- Carronella enne Korshunova, Martynov, Bakken, Evertsen, Fletcher, Mudianta, Saito, Lundin, Schrödl & Picton, 2017
- Clione okhotensis Yamazaki & Kuwahara, 2017
- Coryphellina lotos Korshunova, Martynov, Bakken, Evertsen, Fletcher, Mudianta, Saito, Lundin, Schrödl & Picton, 2017
- Doris acerico Ortea & Espinosa, 2017
- Doris juanformelli Ortea & Espinosa, 2017
- Doris parrae Ortea, 2017
- Elysia chavelavargas Ortea, 2017
- Elysia delcarmen Ortea, 2017
- Elysia jaramilloi Ortea, Moro & Bacallado, 2017
- Felimare aurantimaculata Ortigosa, Pola & Cervera, 2017
- Fjordia chriskaugei Korshunova, Martynov, Bakken, Evertsen, Fletcher, Mudianta, Saito, Lundin, Schrödl & Picton, 2017
- Gulenia monicae Korshunova, Martynov, Bakken, Evertsen, Fletcher, Mudianta, Saito, Lundin, Schrödl & Picton, 2017
- Gulenia orjani Korshunova, Martynov, Bakken, Evertsen, Fletcher, Mudianta, Saito, Lundin, Schrödl & Picton, 2017
- Knoutsodonta pictoni Furfaro & Trainito, 2017
- Lapinura aestus Ortea, Moro & Espinosa, 2017
- Lapinura josemeloi Ortea, Moro & Espinosa, 2017
- Okenia picoensis Paz-Sedano, Ortigosa & Pola, 2017
- Onchidoris expectata Martynov & Korshunova, 2017
- Pacifia amica Korshunova, Martynov, Bakken, Evertsen, Fletcher, Mudianta, Saito, Lundin, Schrödl & Picton, 2017
- Paracoryphella ignicrystalla Korshunova, Martynov, Bakken, Evertsen, Fletcher, Mudianta, Saito, Lundin, Schrödl & Picton, 2017
- Paradoris annularis Ortea, Espinosa & Moro, 2017
- Samla takashigei Korshunova, Martynov, Bakken, Evertsen, Fletcher, Mudianta, Saito, Lundin, Schrödl & Picton, 2017
- Unidentia nihonrossija Korshunova, Martynov, Bakken, Evertsen, Fletcher, Mudianta, Saito, Lundin, Schrödl & Picton, 2017
- Unidentia sandramillenae Korshunova, Martynov, Bakken, Evertsen, Fletcher, Mudianta, Saito, Lundin, Schrödl & Picton, 2017
- Zelentia ninel Korshunova, Martynow & Picton, 2017
- Ziminella abyssa Korshunova, Martynov, Bakken, Evertsen, Fletcher, Mudianta, Saito, Lundin, Schrödl & Picton, 2017
- Ziminella circapolaris Korshunova, Martynov, Bakken, Evertsen, Fletcher, Mudianta, Saito, Lundin, Schrödl & Picton, 2017

=== New subspecies ===
- Apata pricei komandorica Korshunova, Martynov, Bakken, Evertsen, Fletcher, Mudianta, Saito, Lundin, Schrödl & Picton, 2017
- Austrasiatica langfordi poppeorum Lorenz & Chiapponi, 2017
- Austrocypraea reevei bishopi Petuch, Berschauer & Waller, 2017
- Austrocypraea reevei lorenzoi Chiapponi, 2017
- Bistolida stolida lorrainae Lorenz, 2017
- Bistolida ursellus jomi Meyer & Lorenz, 2017
- Cribrarula abaliena erypersica Meyer & Lorenz, 2017
- Cypraea tigris lorenzi Meyer & Tweedt, 2017
- Erronea caurica chrismeyeri Lorenz, 2017
- Lyncina ventriculus johnclarki Meyer & Lorenz, 2017
- Mauritia maculifera andreae Erdmann & Lorenz, 2017
- Mauritia scurra occidua Meyer & Lorenz, 2017
- Microchlamylla gracilis zfi Korshunova, Martynov, Bakken, Evertsen, Fletcher, Mudianta, Saito, Lundin, Schrödl & Picton, 2017
- Mitraelyria mitraeformis grockeae Petuch, Berschauer & Waller, 2017
- Palmadusta ziczac yzac Meyer & Lorenz, 2017
- Purpuradusta fimbriata insolita Meyer & Lorenz, 2017
- Purpuradusta minoridens julianjosephi Lorenz, 2017
- Ransoniella punctata bridgesi Meyer & Lorenz, 2017
- Ransoniella punctata conleyi Meyer & Lorenz, 2017

=== New genera ===
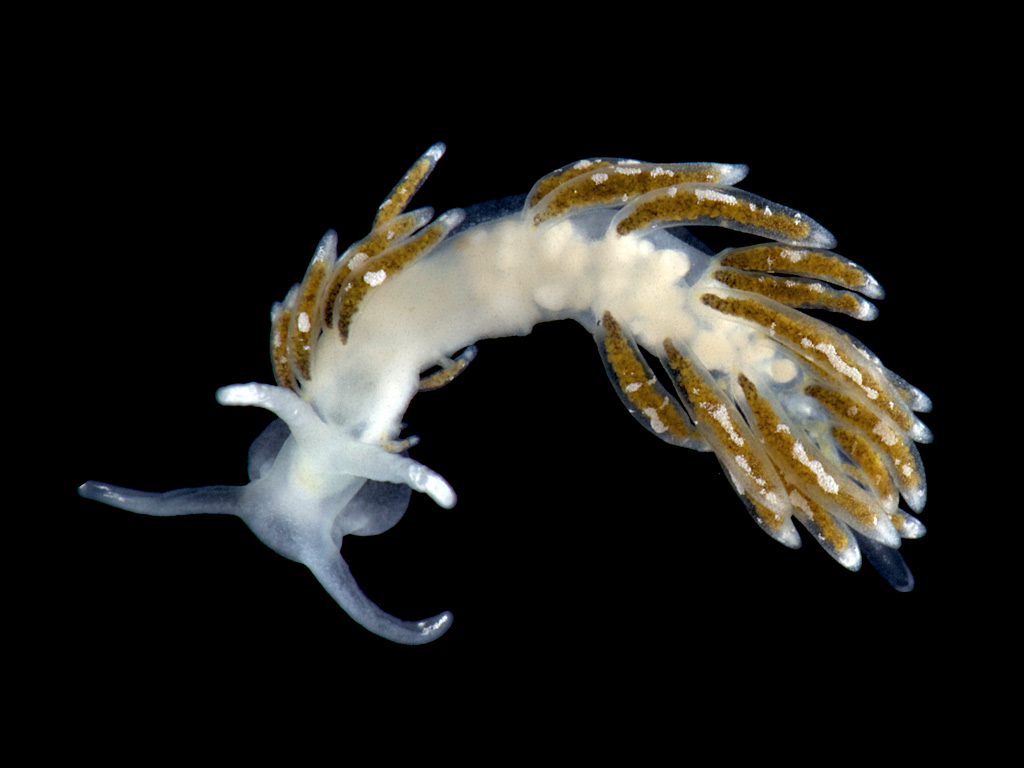
Zelentia pustulata, one of the three species included in the newly described genus Zelentia

- Aegeofusinus Russo, 2017
- Apata Korshunova, Martynov, Bakken, Evertsen, Fletcher, Mudianta, Saito, Lundin, Schrödl & Picton, 2017
- Baenopsis Korshunova, Martynov, Bakken, Evertsen, Fletcher, Mudianta, Saito, Lundin, Schrödl & Picton, 2017
- Borealea Korshunova, Martynov, Bakken, Evertsen, Fletcher, Mudianta, Saito, Lundin, Schrödl & Picton, 2017 (replacement name for Borealia Korshunova, Martynov, Bakken, Evertsen, Fletcher, Mudianta, Saito, Lundin, Schrödl & Picton, 2017)
- Carronella Korshunova, Martynov, Bakken, Evertsen, Fletcher, Mudianta, Saito, Lundin, Schrödl & Picton, 2017
- Circuitus Rubio & Rolán, 2017
- Dracogyra Chen, Zhou, Wang & Copley, 2017
- Edmundsella Korshunova, Martynov, Bakken, Evertsen, Fletcher, Mudianta, Saito, Lundin, Schrödl & Picton, 2017
- Fjordia Korshunova, Martynov, Bakken, Evertsen, Fletcher, Mudianta, Saito, Lundin, Schrödl & Picton, 2017
- Gulenia Korshunova, Martynov, Bakken, Evertsen, Fletcher, Mudianta, Saito, Lundin, Schrödl & Picton, 2017
- Itaxia Korshunova, Martynov, Bakken, Evertsen, Fletcher, Mudianta, Saito, Lundin, Schrödl & Picton, 2017
- Kynaria Korshunova, Martynov, Bakken, Evertsen, Fletcher, Mudianta, Saito, Lundin, Schrödl & Picton, 2017
- Luisella Korshunova, Martynov, Bakken, Evertsen, Fletcher, Mudianta, Saito, Lundin, Schrödl & Picton, 2017
- Microchlamylla Korshunova, Martynov, Bakken, Evertsen, Fletcher, Mudianta, Saito, Lundin, Schrödl & Picton, 2017
- Occidenthella Korshunova, Martynov, Bakken, Evertsen, Fletcher, Mudianta, Saito, Lundin, Schrödl & Picton, 2017 (replacement name for Occidentella Korshunova, Martynov, Bakken, Evertsen, Fletcher, Mudianta, Saito, Lundin, Schrödl & Picton, 2017)
- Orienthella Korshunova, Martynov, Bakken, Evertsen, Fletcher, Mudianta, Saito, Lundin, Schrödl & Picton, 2017 (replacement name for Orientella Korshunova, Martynov, Bakken, Evertsen, Fletcher, Mudianta, Saito, Lundin, Schrödl & Picton, 2017)
- Pacifia Korshunova, Martynov, Bakken, Evertsen, Fletcher, Mudianta, Saito, Lundin, Schrödl & Picton, 2017
- Paraflabellina Korshunova, Martynov, Bakken, Evertsen, Fletcher, Mudianta, Saito, Lundin, Schrödl & Picton, 2017
- Recourtoliva Petuch & Berschauer, 2017
- Vullietoliva Petuch & Berschauer, 2017
- Zelentia Korshunova, Martynow & Picton, 2017
- Ziminella Korshunova, Martynov, Bakken, Evertsen, Fletcher, Mudianta, Saito, Lundin, Schrödl & Picton, 2017

== Freshwater gastropods ==
=== New species ===
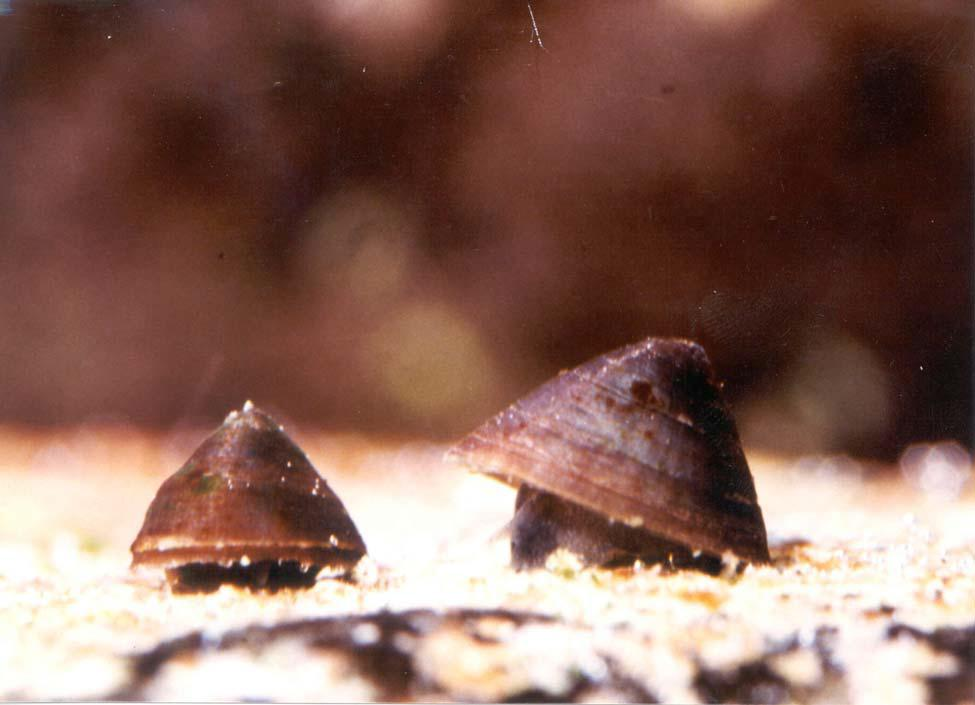
Live specimens of Idaholanx fresti

- Belgrandia alvaroi Holyoak, Holyoak & Mendes, 2017
- Belgrandia jordaoi Holyoak, Holyoak & Mendes, 2017
- Bythinella yerlii Gürlek, 2017
- Bithynia kayrae Odabaşı & Odabaşı, 2017
- Bullaregia tunisiensis Khalloufi, Béjaoui & Delicado, 2017
- Erhaia wangchuki Gittenberger, Sherub & Stelbrink, 2017
- Fluminicola fresti Hershler, Liu & Hubbart, 2017
- Fluminicola umpquaensis Hershler, Liu & Hubbart, 2017
- Grossuana maceradica Boeters, Glöer & Stamenković, 2017
- Idaholanx fresti Clark, Campbell & Lydeard, 2017
- Iglica soussensis Ghamizi & Boulal, 2017
- Islamia burduricus Yıldırım, Çağlan Kaya, Gürlek & Bahadır Koca, 2017
- Islamia mylonas Radea, Parmakelis, Demetropoulos & Vardinoyannis, 2017
- Mercuria corsensis Boeters & Falkner, 2017
- Paladilhiopsis falniowskii Grego, Glöer, Erőss & Fehér, 2017
- Paladilhiopsis lozei Grego, Glöer, Erőss & Fehér, 2017
- Paladilhiopsis prekalensis Grego, Glöer, Erőss & Fehér, 2017
- Paladilhiopsis szekeresi Grego, Glöer, Erőss & Fehér, 2017
- Paladilhiopsis wohlberedti Grego, Glöer, Erőss & Fehér, 2017
- Plagigeyeria steffeki Grego, Glöer, Erőss & Fehér, 2017
- Pontobelgrandiella lavrasi Boeters, Reischütz & Reischütz, 2017
- Potamolithus elenae de Lucía & Gutiérrez Gregoric, 2017
- Pseudobithynia adiyamanensis Gürlek, 2017
- Pseudorientalia ceriti Gürlek, 2017
- Pyrgulopsis lindahlae Hershler, Liu, Forsyth, Hovingh & Wheeler, 2017
- Pyrgulopsis nuwuvi Hershler, Liu, Forsyth, Hovingh & Wheeler, 2017
- Pyrgulopsis santaclarensis Hershler, Liu, Forsyth, Hovingh & Wheeler, 2017
- Tchangmargarya ziyi Zhang, 2017

=== New genera ===
- Bullaregia Khalloufi, Béjaoui & Delicado, 2017
- Devetakiola Georgiev in Georgiev et al., 2017
- Idaholanx Clark, Campbell & Lydeard, 2017
- Stoyanovia Georgiev in Georgiev et al., 2017

== Land gastropods ==
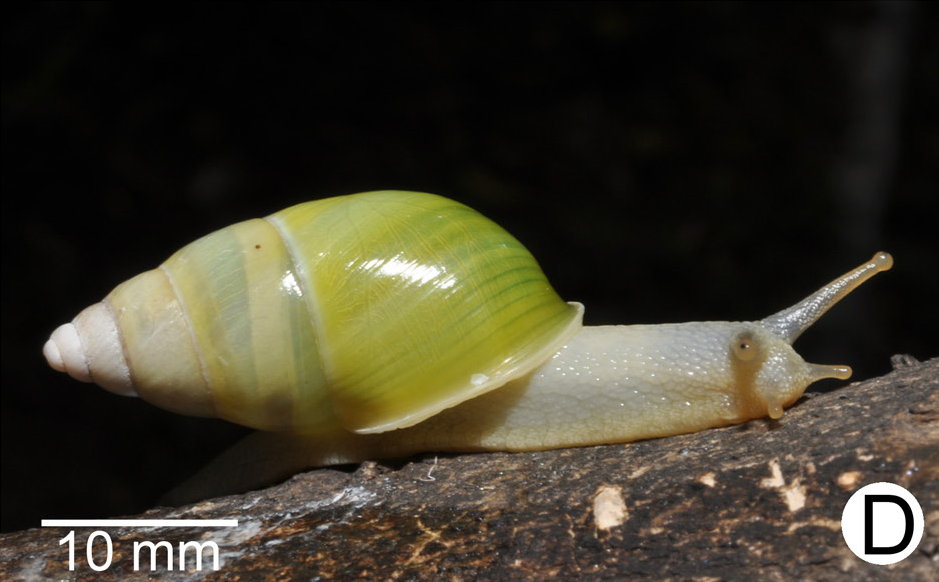
A live specimen of Amphidromus syndromoideus

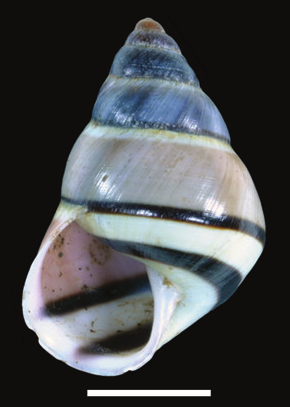
Amphidromus xiengkhaungensis shell. Scale bar is 10 mm.

=== New species ===
- Acrotoma likharevi Solodovnikov & Szekeres, 2017
- Acrotoma reshaviensis Solodovnikov & Szekeres, 2017
- Alycaeus selangoriensis Foon & Liew, 2017
- Alycaeus costacrassa Foon & Liew, 2017
- Alycaeus ikanensis Foon & Liew, 2017
- Alycaeus alticola Foon & Liew, 2017
- Alycaeus charasensis Foon & Liew, 2017
- Alycaeus kurauensis Foon & Liew, 2017
- Alycaeus regalis Foon & Liew, 2017
- Alycaeus virgogravida Foon & Liew, 2017
- Alycaeus senyumensis Foon & Liew, 2017
- Alycaeus expansus Foon & Liew, 2017
- Alycaeus clementsi Foon & Liew, 2017
- Amphidromus syndromoideus Inkhavilay & Panha, 2017
- Amphidromus xiengkhaungensis Inkhavilay & Panha, 2017
- Angustopila stochi Páll-Gergely & Jochum in Páll-Gergely, Jochum & Asami, 2017
- Annularisca haylerae Espinosa, Herrera-Uría & Ortea, 2017
- Apoecus ramelauensis Köhler, Criscione, Burghardt & Kessner, 2017
- Arangia humboldtiana Espinosa, Herrera-Uría & Ortea, 2017
- Arinia yanseni Nurinsiyah & Hausdorf, 2017
- Bellardiella kovacsi Varga & Páll-Gergely, 2017
- Bellardiella saparuana Varga & Páll-Gergely, 2017
- Carcinostemma silvai Espinosa, Herrera-Uría & Ortea, 2017
- Carychium hardiei Jochum & Weigand in Jochum et al., 2017
- Carychium belizeensis Jochum & Weigand in Jochum et al., 2017
- Carychium zarzaae Jochum & Weigand in Jochum et al., 2017
- Chondropomium caelicum Watters & Larson, 2017
- Chondropomium sardonyx Watters & Larson, 2017
- Clydonopoma titanum Watters & Larson, 2017
- Colonina gerhardfellneri Watters & Frank-Fellner, 2017
- Coryda caraballoi Espinosa, Herrera-Uría & Ortea, 2017
- Coryda thierryi Espinosa, Herrera-Uría & Ortea, 2017
- Cotyorica nemethi Grego & Szekeres, 2017
- Dautzenbergiella paulae Grego & Szekeres, 2017
- Dendrolimax parensis Rowson, Paustian & van Goethem, 2017
- Dentisphaera maxema Páll-Gergely & Jochum in Páll-Gergely, Jochum & Asami, 2017
- Diplommatina abiesiana Budha & Naggs in Budha, Naggs & Backeljau, 2017
- Diplommatina fistulata Budha & Naggs in Budha, Naggs & Backeljau, 2017
- Diplommatina godawariensis Budha & Naggs in Budha, Naggs & Backeljau, 2017
- Diplommatina halimunensis Nurinsiyah & Hausdorf, 2017
- Diplommatina heryantoi Nurinsiyah & Hausdorf, 2017
- Diplommatina kakenca Nurinsiyah & Hausdorf, 2017
- Diplommatina maipokhariensis Budha & Naggs in Budha, Naggs & Backeljau, 2017
- Diplommatina ristiae Nurinsiyah & Hausdorf, 2017
- Diplommatina salgharica Budha & Backeljau in Budha, Naggs & Backeljau, 2017
- Diplommatina shivapuriensis Budha & Backeljau in Budha, Naggs & Backeljau, 2017
- Diplommatina syabrubesiensis Budha & Backeljau in Budha, Naggs & Backeljau, 2017
- Diplommatina timorensis Greke, 2017
- and other 53 new species of Diplommatinidae described by Greke, 2017
- Diplopoma mucaralense Espinosa, Herrera-Uría & Ortea, 2017
- Ditropopsis ciliata Greke, 2017
- Emoda poeyana Espinosa, Herrera-Uría & Ortea, 2017
- Formosana kremeri Grego & Szekeres, 2017
- Fuchsiana zhangqingae Grego & Szekeres, 2017

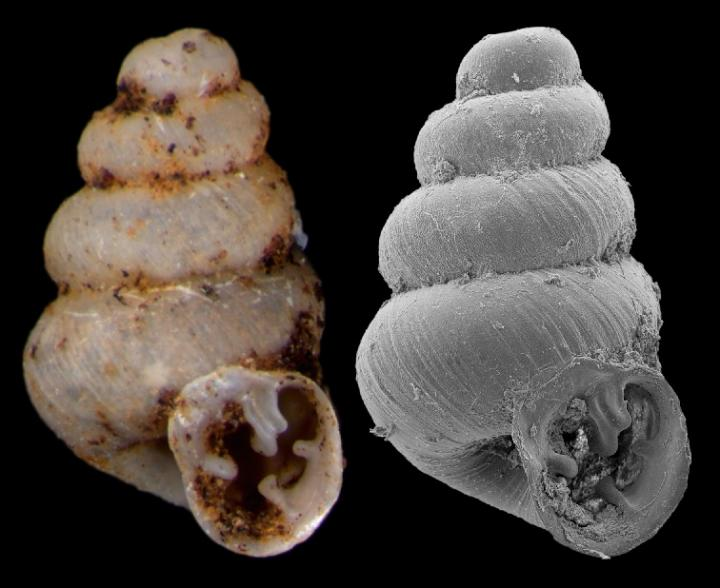
A shell of Gastrocopta sharae seen under a light microscope (left) and under a scanning electron microscope (right)

- Gastrocopta sharae Salvador, Cavallari & Simone, 2017
- Glessula tamakoshi Budha & Backeljau in Budha, Naggs & Backeljau, 2017
- Harmozica zangezurica Gural-Sverlova, Amiryan & Gural, 2017
- Kenyirus balingensis Tan, Chan & Foon, 2017
- Kerkophorus piperatus Herbert, 2017
- Kerkophorus scrobicolus Herbert, 2017
- Kerkophorus terrestris Herbert, 2017
- Kerkophorus vittarubra Herbert, 2017
- Kugitangia hatagica Schileyko, Pazilov & Abdulazizova, 2017
- Leptichnoides avisexcrementis Rowson, Paustian & van Goethem, 2017
- Luzonocoptis angulata Páll-Gergely & Hunyadi in Páll-Gergely, Hunyadi & Asami, 2017
- Luzonocoptis antenna Páll-Gergely & Hunyadi in Páll-Gergely, Hunyadi & Asami, 2017
- Margaritiphaedusa hunyadii Grego & Szekeres, 2017
- Melayonchis aileenae Dayrat & Goulding in Dayrat, Goulding, Apte, Bhave & Xuân, 2017
- Melayonchis annae Dayrat in Dayrat, Goulding, Apte, Bhave & Xuân, 2017
- Melayonchis eloisae Dayrat in Dayrat, Goulding, Apte, Bhave & Xuân, 2017
- Melayonchis siongkiati Dayrat & Goulding in Dayrat, Goulding, Apte, Bhave & Xuân, 2017
- Messageriella gargominyi Páll-Gergely & Szekeres, 2017
- Metalycaeus minatoi Páll-Gergely in Páll-Gergely & Asami, 2017
- Microkerkus sibaya Herbert, 2017
- Micropontica olgae Solodovnikov & Szekeres, 2017

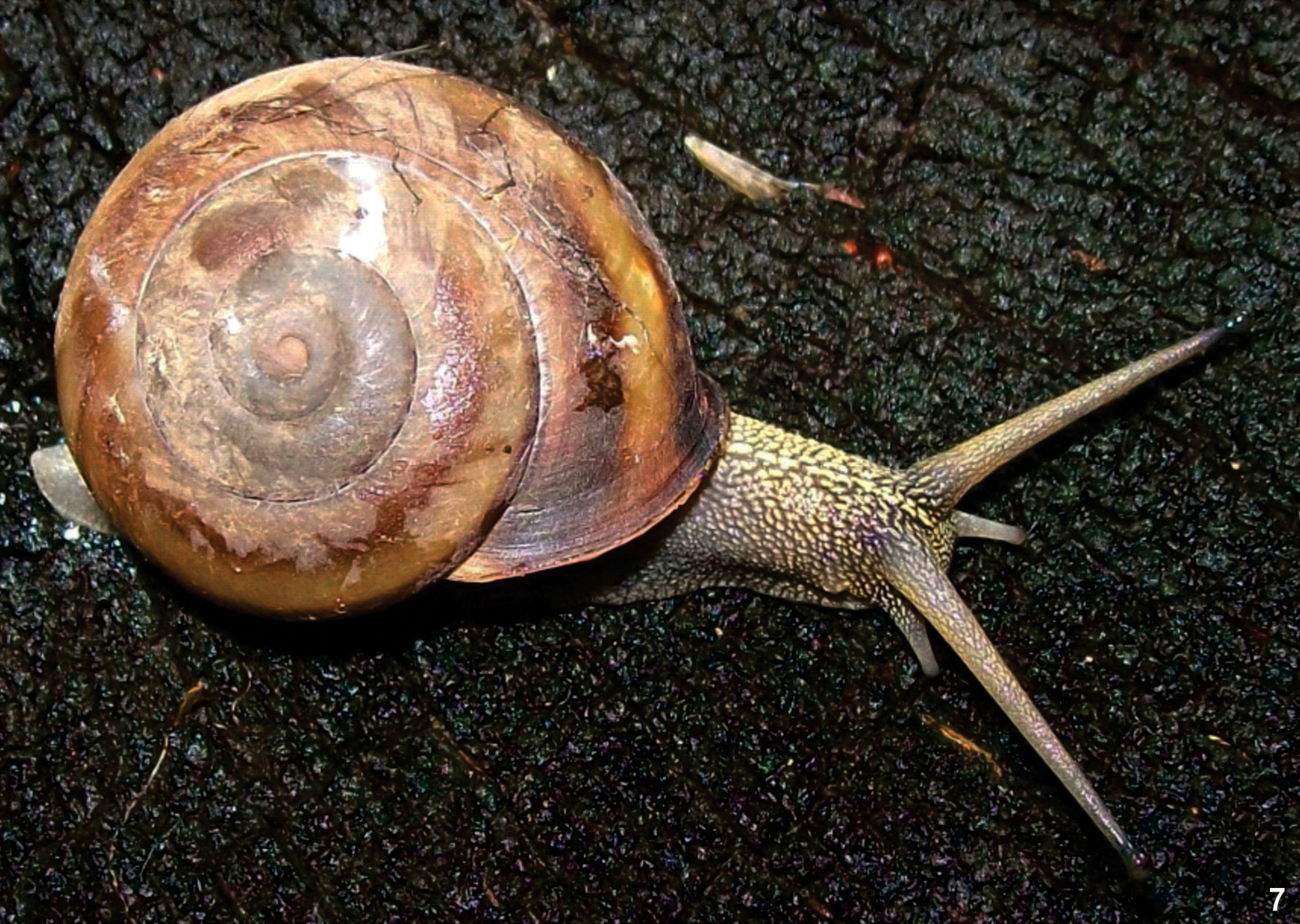
A live specimen of Minaselates paradoxa

- Minaselates paradoxa Cuezzo & Pena, 2017
- Monacha tibarenica Neiber & Hausdorf, 2017
- Mysticarion obscurior Hyman, Lamborena & Köhler, 2017
- Obeliscus diegoi Espinosa, Herrera-Uría & Ortea, 2017
- Oospira yanghaoi Grego & Szekeres, 2017
- Parmavitrina flavocarinata Hyman, Lamborena & Köhler, 2017
- Parmavitrina maculosa Hyman, Lamborena & Köhler, 2017

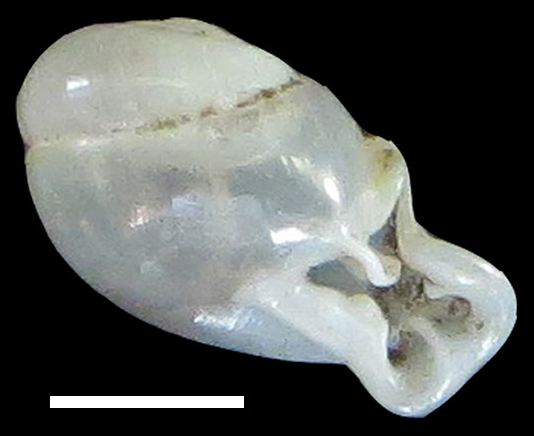
Perrottetia hongthinhae shell

- Perrottetia hongthinhae Do, 2017
- Pincerna yanseni Páll-Gergely, 2017
- Pupina sonlaensis Do, 2017
- Pupina thaitranbaii Do, 2017
- Rahula kleini Gittenberger, Leda & Sherub, 2017
- Rahula trongsaensis Gittenberger, Leda & Sherub, 2017
- Rishetia kathmandica Budha & Backeljau in Budha, Naggs & Backeljau, 2017
- Rishetia nagarjunensis Budha & Naggs in Budha, Naggs & Backeljau, 2017
- Rishetia rishikeshi Budha & Naggs in Budha, Naggs & Backeljau, 2017
- Rishetia subulata Budha & Naggs in Budha, Naggs & Backeljau, 2017
- Rishetia tribhuvana Budha in Budha, Naggs & Backeljau, 2017
- Scolodonta rinae Miquel & Bungartz, 2017
- Scutalus chango Araya & Breure, 2017
- Sesara triodon Tanmuangpak & Tumpeesuwan in Tanmuangpak, Tumpeesuwan & Tumpeesuwan, 2017
- Selatodryas luteosoma Herbert, 2017
- Selatodryas roseosoma Herbert, 2017
- Sheldonia fingolandensis Herbert, 2017
- Selenophaedusa jimenezi Grego & Szekeres, 2017
- Serriphaedusa poppei Grego & Szekeres, 2017
- Serriphaedusa yanghaoi Grego & Szekeres, 2017
- Streptaulus longituba Páll-Gergely & Gargominy in Páll-Gergely et al., 2017
- Synprosphyma ambigua Grego & Szekeres, 2017
- Synprosphyma segersi Grego & Szekeres, 2017
- Tanzalimax seddonae Rowson, Paustian & van Goethem, 2017
- Tanzalimax tattersfieldi Rowson, Paustian & van Goethem, 2017
- Tonkinospira tomasini Páll-Gergely & Jochum in Páll-Gergely, Jochum & Asami, 2017
- Tropidauchenia sulcicollis Grego & Szekeres, 2017
- Tropidauchenia yanghaoi Grego & Szekeres, 2017
- Udzungwalimax suminis Rowson, Paustian & van Goethem, 2017
- Vulnus wallacei Páll-Gergely, Otani & Hosoda in Páll-Gergely, Otani, Hosoda, Asami & Harl, 2017

=== New subspecies ===
- Albinaria amalthea unipalatalis Nordsieck, 2017
- Albinaria arthuriana xenogena Nordsieck, 2017
- Albinaria candida monachorum Nordsieck, 2017
- Albinaria corrugata gemina Nordsieck, 2017
- Albinaria eburnea sprattiana Nordsieck, 2017
- Albinaria idaea letoana Nordsieck, 2017
- Albinaria loosjesi sigridae Nordsieck, 2017
- Albinaria maltzani ecristata Nordsieck, 2017
- Albinaria tenuicostata theresiae Nordsieck, 2017
- Albinaria teres andreae Nordsieck, 2017
- Albinaria troglodytes kitteli Nordsieck, 2017
- Albinaria xanthostoma diktymna Nordsieck, 2017
- Margaritiphaedusa whitteni kremerorum Grego & Szekeres, 2017
- Metafruticicola nicosiana viglensis Neubert & Hirschfelder, 2017
- Oospira naggsi parva Páll-Gergely & Szekeres, 2017
- Pseudoveronicella zootoca tanzaniensis Rowson, Paustian & van Goethem, 2017
- Speleodentorcula beroni maniates Reischütz, Steiner-Reischütz & Reischütz, 2017

=== New genera ===
- Amanica Nordsieck, 2017
- Attenborougharion Hyman & Köhler, 2017
- Backeljaia Chueca, Gómez-Moliner, Madeira & Pfenninger, 2017
- Bellardiella (Szekeresia) Varga & Páll-Gergely, 2017
- Castanophaedusa Páll-Gergely & Szekeres, 2017
- Changphaedusa Motochin & Ueshima in Motochin, Wang & Ueshima, 2017
- Coronarchaica Neiber, Razkin & Hausdorf, 2017
- Cotyorica Grego & Szekeres, 2017
- Dendropa Marshall & Worthy, 2017
- Dentisphaera Páll-Gergely & Jochum in Páll-Gergely, Jochum & Asami, 2017
- Garnieria (Doducsangia) Páll-Gergely & Szekeres, 2017
- Metafruticicola (Elbasania) Schileyko & Fehér, 2017
- Kugitangia Schileyko, Pazilov & Abdulazizova, 2017
- Luzonocoptis Páll-Gergely & Hunyadi in Páll-Gergely, Hunyadi & Asami, 2017
- Megalophaedusa (Dimphaedusa) Motochin & Ueshima in Motochin, Wang & Ueshima, 2017
- Megalophaedusa (Tyrannophaedusoides) Motochin & Ueshima in Motochin, Wang & Ueshima, 2017
- Messageriella Páll-Gergely & Szekeres, 2017
- Minaselates Cuezzo & Pena, 2017
- Ogeramua Christensen, 2017
- Orexana Chueca, Gómez-Moliner, Madeira & Pfenninger, 2017
- Selatodryas Herbert, 2017
- Solitariphaedusa Motochin & Ueshima in Motochin, Wang & Ueshima, 2017
- Superbipoma Watters & Larson, 2017
- Ubiquitarion Hyman, Lamborena & Köhler, 2017
- Udzungwalimax Rowson, Paustian & van Goethem, 2017
- Zaptyx (Taiwanphaedusa) Motochin & Ueshima in Motochin, Wang & Ueshima, 2017
- Zarateana Chueca, Gómez-Moliner, Madeira & Pfenninger, 2017

== See also ==
- List of gastropods described in 2016
- List of gastropods described in 2018
