= P. picta =

P. picta may refer to:

- Parascorpaena picta, a marine fish species
- Phyllomacromia picta, a dragonfly species found in Africa
- Polymita picta, the Cuban land snail or painted snail, a large, air-breathing land snail species endemic to Cuba
- Polystira picta, a sea snail species
- Psittacella picta, the painted tiger parrot, a bird species found in Indonesia and Papua New Guinea
- Pterygotrigla picta, the spotted gurnard, a fish species found in the Indo-Pacific oceans
- Pyrola picta, the white-veined wintergreen or whitevein shinleaf, a perennial herb species native to western North America
- Pyrrhura picta, the painted parakeet or painted conure, a bird species found in restricted forests in northern South America and Panama
- Phyciodes picta, a nymphalid (brush-footed) butterfly found in North America. Also known as the painted crescent butterfly.

== See also ==
- Picta
