= Polystira nobilis =

Scientific classification
- Kingdom: Animalia
- Phylum: Mollusca
- Class: Gastropoda
- Subclass: Caenogastropoda
- Order: Neogastropoda
- Family: Turridae
- Genus: Polystira
- Species: P. nobilis

Binomial name
- Polystira nobilis (Hinds, 1843)

Synonyms
- Pleurotoma nobilis Hinds, 1843

Species of gastropod

Polystira nobilis is a species of sea snail, a marine gastropod mollusk in the family Turridae, the turrids.

== Description ==
The fusiform shell is solid and wrinkled. The uppermost whorls are concave, slightly striated and largest near the middle of the keel. Below, it shows small alternating keels. The suture is simple. The outer lip wraps slightly inwards.It is chiefly distinguishable from it in the absence of any keel between the principal keel and the suture, and in some minor characters. The epidermis is covered with pale brown.

This is a very considerably larger shell than Polystira oxytropis, but in the character of the sculpture they closely approach each other.

== Distribution ==
This marine species occurs in the Mexican part of the North Pacific Ocean.
