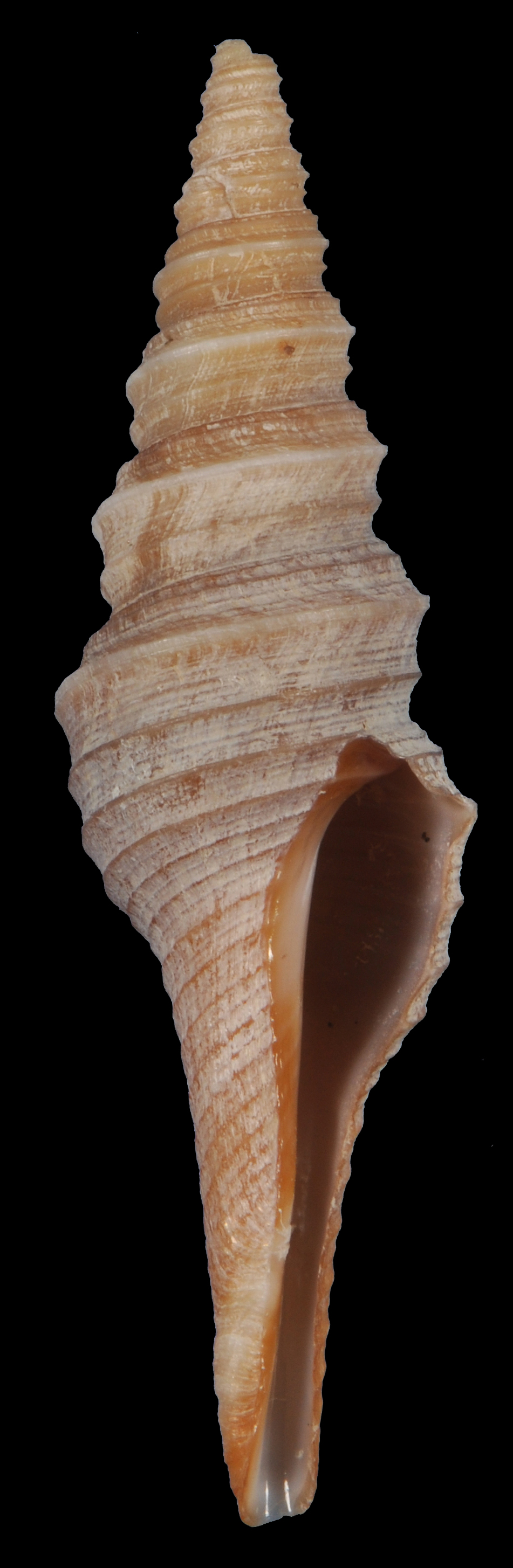
- Shell of Polystira coltrorum (specimen at MNHN, Paris)

Scientific classification
- Kingdom: Animalia
- Phylum: Mollusca
- Class: Gastropoda
- Subclass: Caenogastropoda
- Order: Neogastropoda
- Family: Turridae
- Genus: Polystira
- Species: P. coltrorum

Binomial name
- Polystira coltrorum Petuch, 1993

= Polystira coltrorum =

Species of gastropod

Polystira coltrorum is a species of sea snail, a marine gastropod mollusk in the family Turridae.

== Distribution ==
This marine species occurs off French Guiana.
