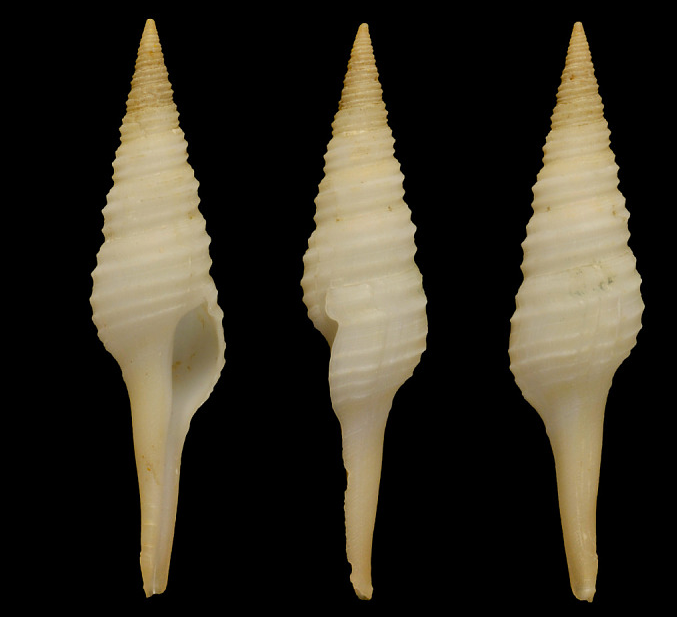
- Shell of Polystira jelskii (holotype at USNM)

Scientific classification
- Kingdom: Animalia
- Phylum: Mollusca
- Class: Gastropoda
- Subclass: Caenogastropoda
- Order: Neogastropoda
- Family: Turridae
- Genus: Polystira
- Species: P. jelskii

Binomial name
- Polystira jelskii (Crosse, 1865)

Synonyms
- Pleurotoma jelskii Crosse, 1865 (original combination); Polystira hilli Petuch, 1988

= Polystira jelskii =

Species of gastropod

Polystira jelskii is a species of sea snail, a marine gastropod mollusk in the family Turridae, the turrids.

== Distribution ==
This species occurs in the North Atlantic Ocean and the Caribbean Sea.
