= Polystira formosissima =

Scientific classification
- Kingdom: Animalia
- Phylum: Mollusca
- Class: Gastropoda
- Subclass: Caenogastropoda
- Order: Neogastropoda
- Family: Turridae
- Genus: Polystira
- Species: P. formosissima

Binomial name
- Polystira formosissima (E.A. Smith, 1915)

Synonyms
- Turris formosissima E.A. Smith, 1915

Species of gastropod

Polystira formosissima is a species of sea snail, a marine gastropod mollusk in the family Turridae, the turrids.
