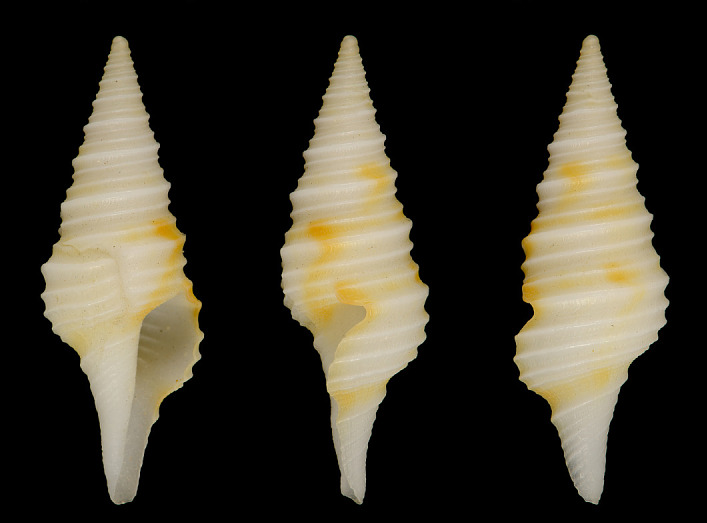
- Shell of Polystira bayeri (holotype at USNM)

Scientific classification
- Kingdom: Animalia
- Phylum: Mollusca
- Class: Gastropoda
- Subclass: Caenogastropoda
- Order: Neogastropoda
- Superfamily: Conoidea
- Family: Turridae
- Genus: Polystira
- Species: P. bayeri

Binomial name
- Polystira bayeri Petuch, 2001

= Polystira bayeri =

Species of gastropod

Polystira bayeri is a species of sea snail, a marine gastropod mollusk in the family Turridae, the turrids.

== Distribution ==
This marine species occurs off the Bimini Islands, The Bahamas at shallow depths.
