= Polystira parthenia =

Scientific classification
- Kingdom: Animalia
- Phylum: Mollusca
- Class: Gastropoda
- Subclass: Caenogastropoda
- Order: Neogastropoda
- Superfamily: Conoidea
- Family: Turridae
- Genus: Polystira
- Species: P. parthenia

Binomial name
- Polystira parthenia Berry, 1957

Species of gastropod

Polystira parthenia is a species of sea snail, a marine gastropod mollusk in the family Turridae, the turrids.

The paratype is located at the USNM.

== Distribution ==
This species occurs at the Gulf of Nicoya, Costa Rica (Pacific Ocean).
