= Polystira vibex =

Scientific classification
- Kingdom: Animalia
- Phylum: Mollusca
- Class: Gastropoda
- Subclass: Caenogastropoda
- Order: Neogastropoda
- Family: Turridae
- Genus: Polystira
- Species: P. vibex

Binomial name
- Polystira vibex (Dall, 1889)

Synonyms
- Pleurotoma albida var. vibex Dall, 1889; Pleurotoma antillarum Crosse, 1865 (uncertain synonym; invalid: junior homonym of Pleurotoma antillarum d'Orbigny, 1847); Pleurotoma vibex Dall, 1889

Species of gastropod

Polystira vibex is a species of sea snail, a marine gastropod mollusc in the family Turridae, the turrids.

== Description ==
The length of the shell attains 19.6 mm, its width 4.75 mm.

The shell resembles in a general way the young of Polystira albida of the same size. The protoconch is the same. The spiral sculpture resembles that of P. albida but is flat-topped instead of sharp. The transverse sculpture is less prominent, the spirals somewhat more numerous. The chief character which strikes one on comparing the P. vibex with P. albida is that the shell is surrounded with bands of olive-green color, polished, narrow and resident in the epidermis, but visible through the translucent shell in the aperture. These bands sometimes fill the spiral channels. Sometimes there are two olive bands separated by a pale one between two of the elevated spirals. Sometimes the flat tops of the spirals are thus colored. In general there will be about ten of these olive stripes on the body whorl. They extend only over the whorl, the pillar from its junction with the body is destitute of them, and, when fresh, is of a delicate rose color, which is apt to fade. This white or rosy rostrum contrasts vividly with the striped body and spire.

== Distribution ==
P. vibex can be found in Caribbean waters, ranging from the eastern coast of Florida south to the Lesser Antilles.
