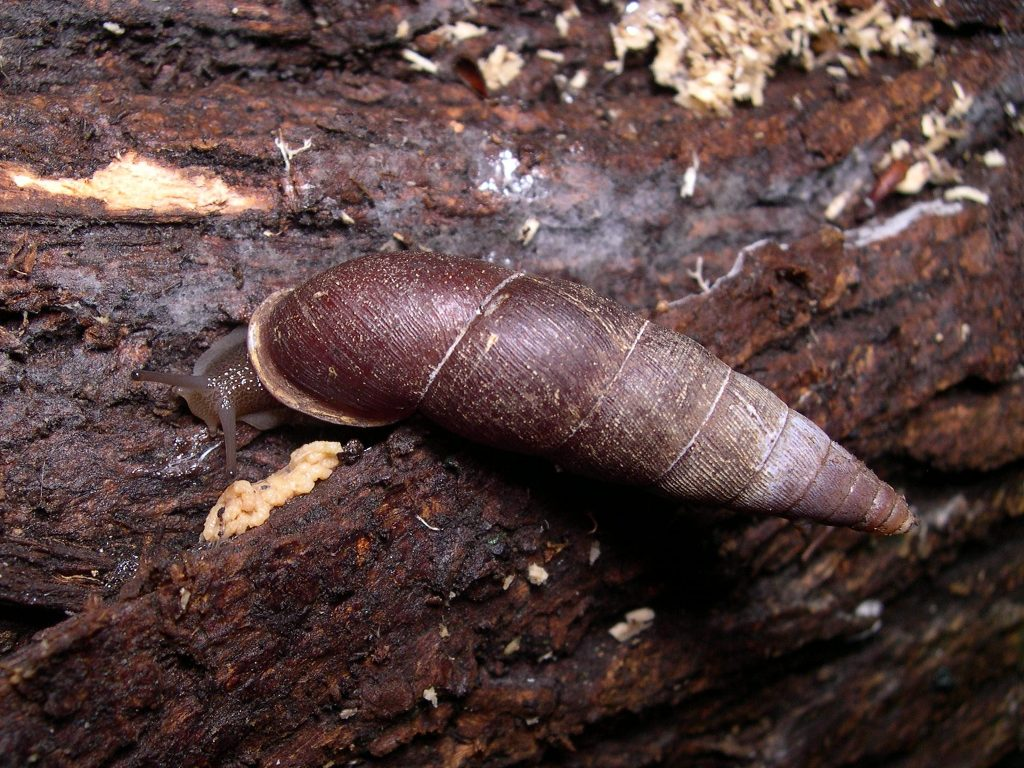
- Megalophaedusa martensi. The individual in the photo has a shell 45.5 mm long and weighs 3.2g with the soft parts intact.

Scientific classification
- Kingdom: Animalia
- Phylum: Mollusca
- Class: Gastropoda
- Order: Stylommatophora
- Family: Clausiliidae
- Genus: Megalophaedusa
- Species: M. martensi

Binomial name
- Megalophaedusa martensi (Martens, 1860)

= Megalophaedusa martensi =

Species of gastropod

Megalophaedusa martensi is a species of medium-sized air-breathing land snail, a terrestrial pulmonate gastropod mollusk in the family Clausiliidae, the door snails, all of which have a clausilium.

== Description ==
Megalophaedusa martensi is the largest species in the family Clausiliidae, worldwide. The species is oviparous.

== Distribution ==
This species is endemic to Japan.
