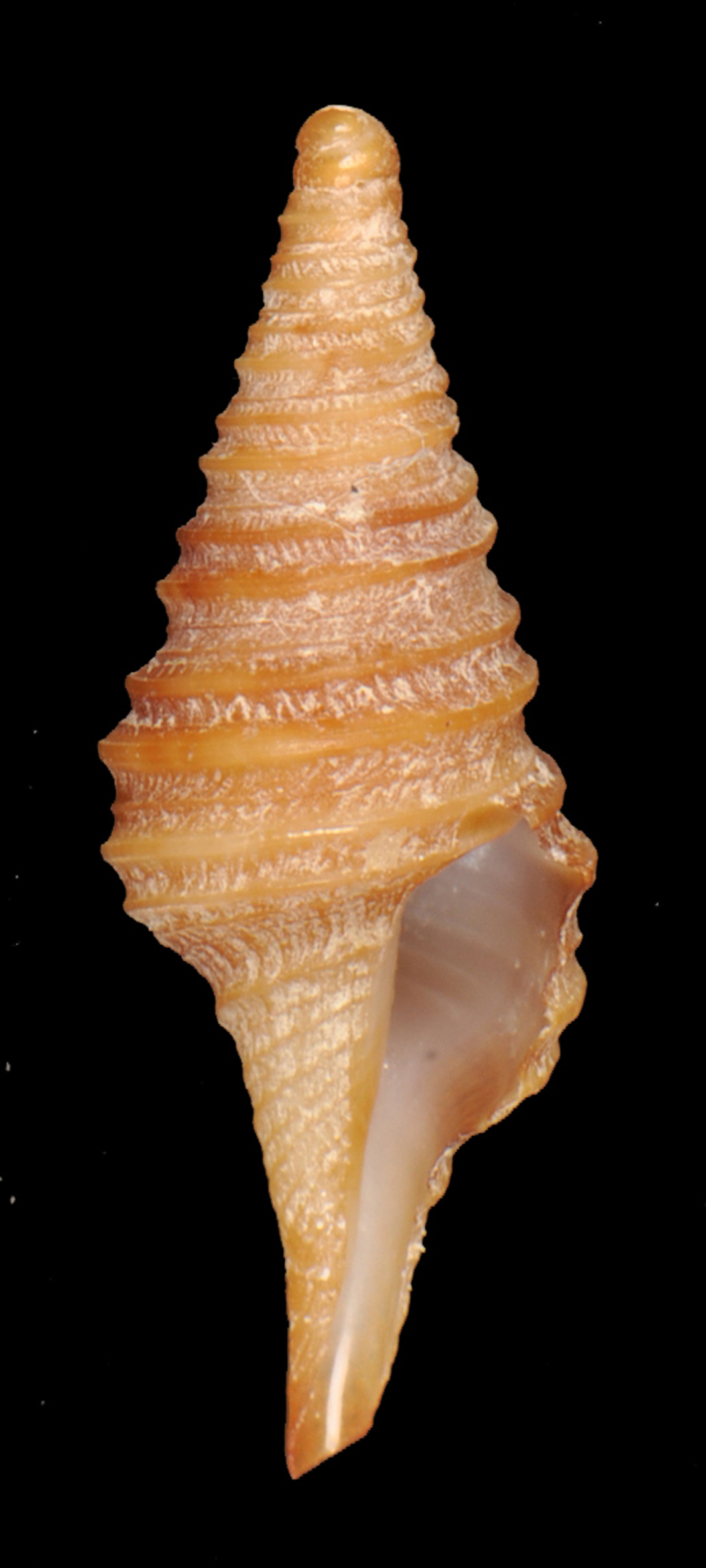
- Shell of Polystira gruneri (specimen at MNHN, Paris)

Scientific classification
- Kingdom: Animalia
- Phylum: Mollusca
- Class: Gastropoda
- Subclass: Caenogastropoda
- Order: Neogastropoda
- Family: Turridae
- Genus: Polystira
- Species: P. gruneri

Binomial name
- Polystira gruneri (Philippi, 1848)

Synonyms
- Pleurotoma gruneri Philippi, 1848; Polystira phillipsi Nowell-Usticke, 1969

= Polystira gruneri =

Species of gastropod

Polystira gruneri is a species of sea snail, a marine gastropod mollusk in the family Turridae, the turrids.

== Distribution ==
This species occurs off Martinique in the Caribbean Sea and off Puerto Rico.
