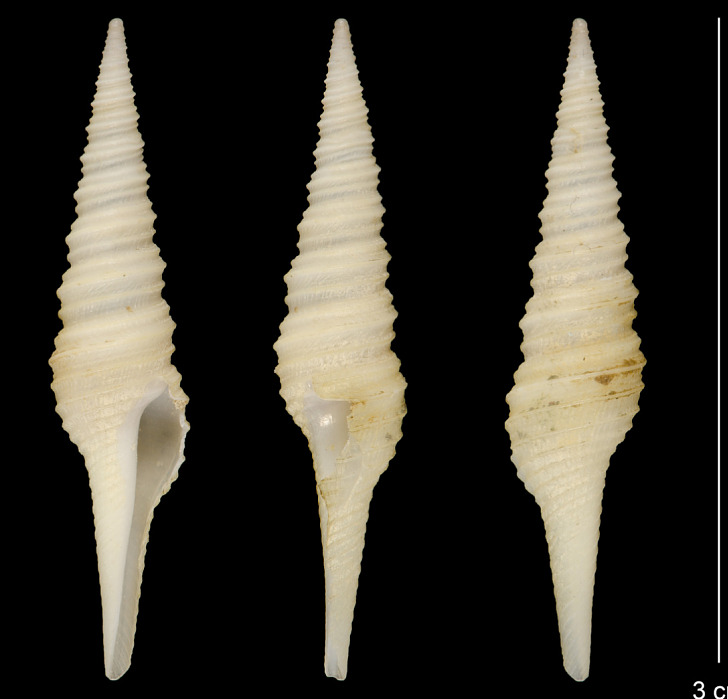
- Shell of Polystira macra (holotype at the USNM)

Scientific classification
- Kingdom: Animalia
- Phylum: Mollusca
- Class: Gastropoda
- Subclass: Caenogastropoda
- Order: Neogastropoda
- Family: Turridae
- Genus: Polystira
- Species: P. macra

Binomial name
- Polystira macra Bartsch, 1934

= Polystira macra =

Species of gastropod

Polystira macra is a species of sea snail, a marine gastropod mollusk in the family Turridae, the turrids.

== Distribution ==
This marine species off Puerto Rico at a depth between 476 m and 658 m.
