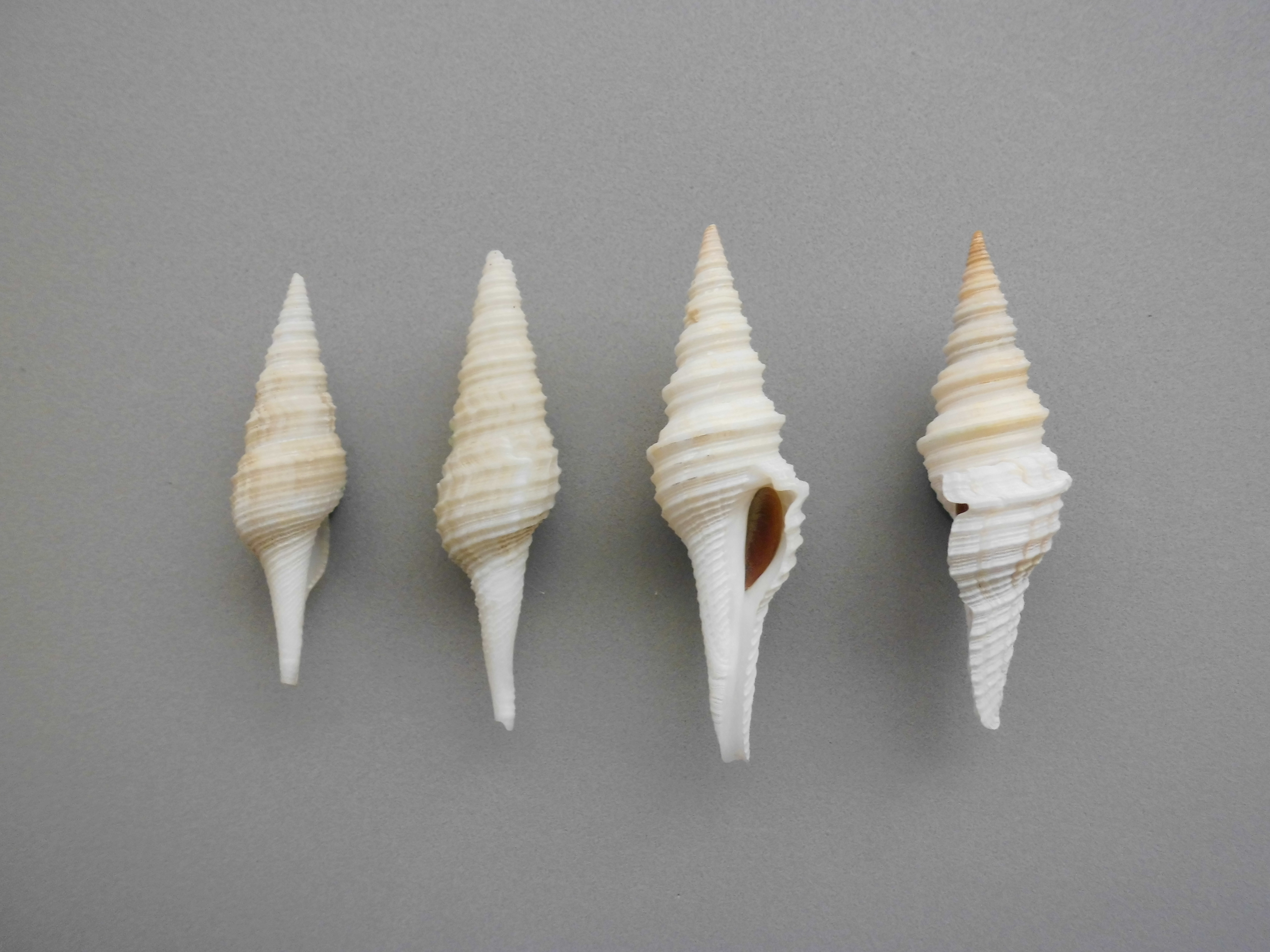
- Polystira albida

Scientific classification
- Kingdom: Animalia
- Phylum: Mollusca
- Class: Gastropoda
- Subclass: Caenogastropoda
- Order: Neogastropoda
- Superfamily: Conoidea
- Family: Turridae
- Genus: Polystira; Woodring, 1928

Type species
- Pleurotoma albida Perry G., 1811

Synonyms
- Oxytropa Glibert, 1955

= Polystira =

Genus of sea snails

Polystira is a genus of sea snails, marine gastropod mollusks in the family Turridae, the turrids.

== Taxonomy ==
Paul Bartsch (1934) states the genus Polystira was created by W. P. Woodring in 1928 for certain large West Indian turrids. He named the largest of the recent species, generally known as Pleurotoma albida Perry, as type. Unfortunately, the mollusk so designated is not Pleurotoma albida Perry, which Perry states " is frequently found at New Zealand and Lord Howe Island." Perry's figure 4, plate 32, of this species does not agree with the West Indian material. It clearly resembles certain shells from North Australia in the collection of the National Museum. The name is, therefore, not applicable to the West Indian shell, which will have to carry the next available designation. Lamarck in 1816, in his " Tableau Encyclopedique et Methodique ", figured on plate 439, as figure 2, the West Indian shell without naming it. Wood, in 1818, in his " Index Testaceologicus ", on page 125, names this species Murex virgo, referring to Lamarck's figure cited above. This appears to be the oldest available name for the type species. The type of Polystira Woodring must therefore be Murex virgo Wood = Polystira albida Woodring, not Perry.

== Distribution ==
This marine genus occurs on the American continent. Its radiation is extensive within its tropics and subtropics with a high species diversity. Several species also occur in the tropical eastern Pacific.

== Species ==
Almost 100 extant species have not yet been described.

Species recognized within the genus Polystira include:

- Polystira albida (G. Perry, 1811)
- Polystira antillarum (Crosse, 1865)
- Polystira artia Berry, 1957
- Polystira bayeri Petuch, 2001
- Polystira coltrorum Petuch, 1993
- Polystira cubacaribbaea Espinosa, Ortea & Moro, 2017
- Polystira eloinae Espinosa, Ortea & Moro, 2017
- Polystira florencae Bartsch, 1934
- Polystira formosissima (Smith E. A., 1915)
- Polystira gruneri (Philippi, 1848)
- Polystira jaguaella Espinosa, Ortea & Moro, 2017
- Polystira jelskii (Crosse, 1865)
- Polystira jiguaniensis Espinosa, Ortea & Moro, 2017
- Polystira juangrinensis Espinosa, Ortea & Moro, 2017
- Polystira lindae Petuch, 1987
- Polystira macra Bartsch, 1934
- Polystira nobilis (Hinds, 1843)
- Polystira oxytropis (G.B. Sowerby I, 1834)
- Polystira parthenia Berry, 1957
- Polystira parvula Espinosa, Ortea & Moro, 2017
- Polystira picta (Reeve, 1843)
- Polystira starretti Petuch, 2002
- Polystira sunderlandi Petuch, 1987
- Polystira tellea (Dall, 1889)
- Polystira vibex (Dall, 1889)

Species brought into synonymy

- Polystira barretti (Guppy, 1866): synonym of Polystira albida (G. Perry, 1811)
- Polystira hilli Petuch, 1988: synonym of Polystira jelskii (Crosse, 1865)
- Polystira phillipsi Nowell-Usticke, 1969: synonym of Polystira gruneri (Philippi, 1848)
- Polystira staretti Petuch, 2002 : synonym of Polystira starretti Petuch, 2002
