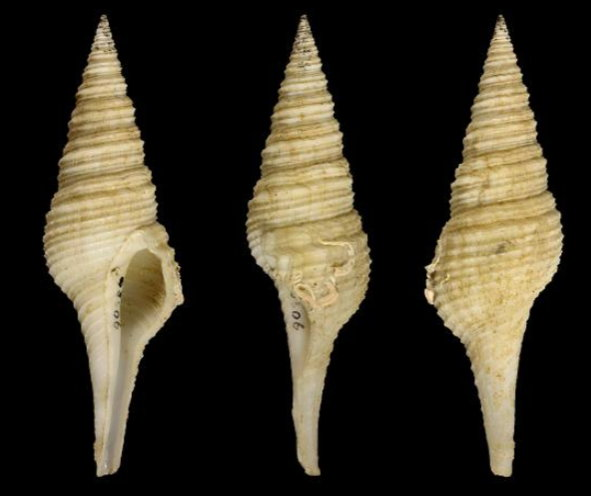
- Shell of Polystira tellea (syntype at the Smithsonian Institution)

Scientific classification
- Kingdom: Animalia
- Phylum: Mollusca
- Class: Gastropoda
- Subclass: Caenogastropoda
- Order: Neogastropoda
- Family: Turridae
- Genus: Polystira
- Species: P. tellea

Binomial name
- Polystira tellea (Dall, 1889)

Synonyms
- Pleurotoma albida tellea Dall, 1889

= Polystira tellea =

Species of gastropod

Polystira tellea is a species of sea snail, a marine gastropod mollusc in the family Turridae, the turrids.

== Description ==
This form differs from the Polystira albida in having the revolving sculpture fainter and more uniform, the transverse sculpture much stronger and more elevated, giving a finely reticulated appearance to the surface. The anal notch is more shallow, the siphonal canal more slender, usually without any umbilical chink.

== Distribution ==
P. tellea can be found in the Gulf of Mexico, ranging from Texas to western Florida.; also off French Guiana, Barbados, Suriname and Colombia. .
