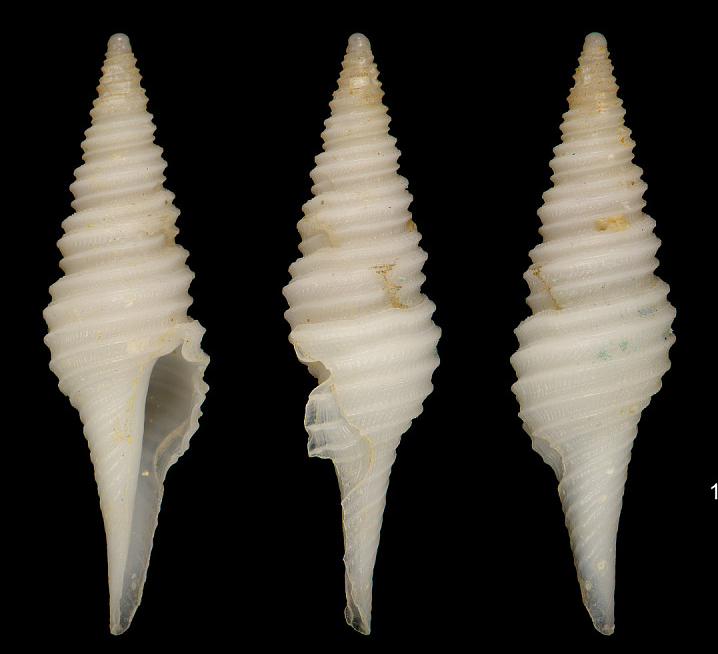
- Shell of Polystira lindae (holotype at USNM)

Scientific classification
- Kingdom: Animalia
- Phylum: Mollusca
- Class: Gastropoda
- Subclass: Caenogastropoda
- Order: Neogastropoda
- Family: Turridae
- Genus: Polystira
- Species: P. lindae

Binomial name
- Polystira lindae Petuch, 1987

= Polystira lindae =

Species of gastropod

Polystira lindae is a species of sea snail, a marine gastropod mollusk in the family Turridae, the turrids.

== Description ==
Original description: "Shell small for genus, slender, elongated; whorls rounded, without shoulder; body whorl with 5 large, sharp-edged cords; spire whorls with 3 cords; siphonal canal with numerous fine spiral threads; anal notch narrow, deep; shell color pure white, interior of aperture white; periostracum thick, velvety."

The shell of the Polystira lindae resembles a cone with a sharp tip.

== Distribution ==
Locus typicus: "Gulf of Venezuela -
off Punto Fijo, Paraguana Peninsula, Venezuela."

This species occurs in the North Atlantic Ocean,

Caribbean Sea, Gulf of Venezuela
