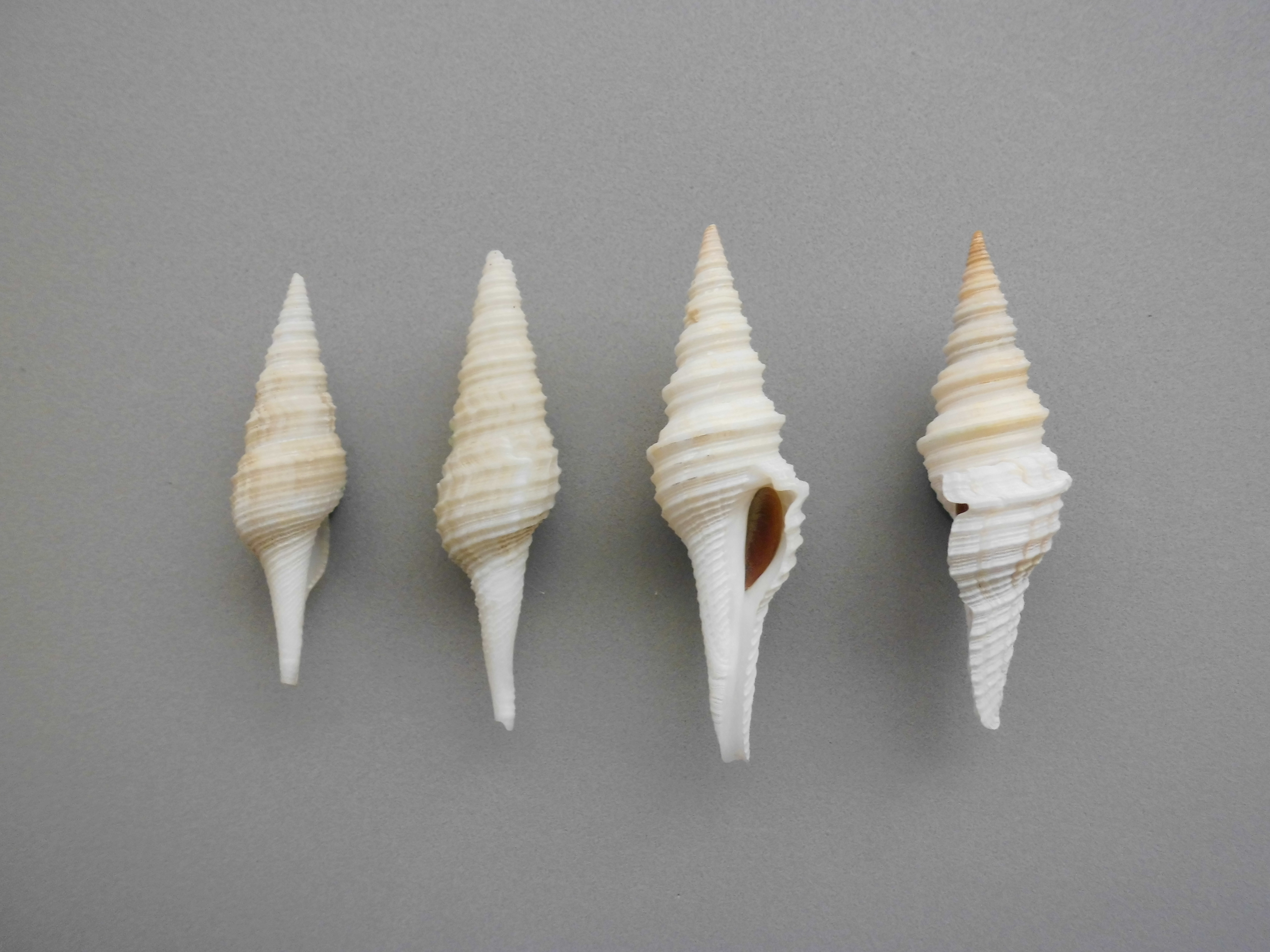

Scientific classification
- Kingdom: Animalia
- Phylum: Mollusca
- Class: Gastropoda
- Subclass: Caenogastropoda
- Order: Neogastropoda
- Superfamily: Conoidea
- Family: Turridae
- Genus: Polystira
- Species: P. albida

Binomial name
- Polystira albida (G. Perry, 1811)

Synonyms
- Pleurotoma albida Perry G., 1811 (original combination) (type lost); Pleurotoma virgo Lamarck, 1816; Turris albida virgo J.B.P.A. Lamarck, 1822; Turris nivea Reeve, L.A., 1843; Cryoturris albida C.B. Adams, 1845

= Polystira albida =

Species of gastropod

Polystira albida, common name white giant turris, is a species of sea snail, a marine gastropod mollusk in the family Turridae, the turrids.

== Distribution ==
P. albida can be found in Western Atlantic waters, ranging from the eastern coast of Florida south to Brazil.

== Description ==
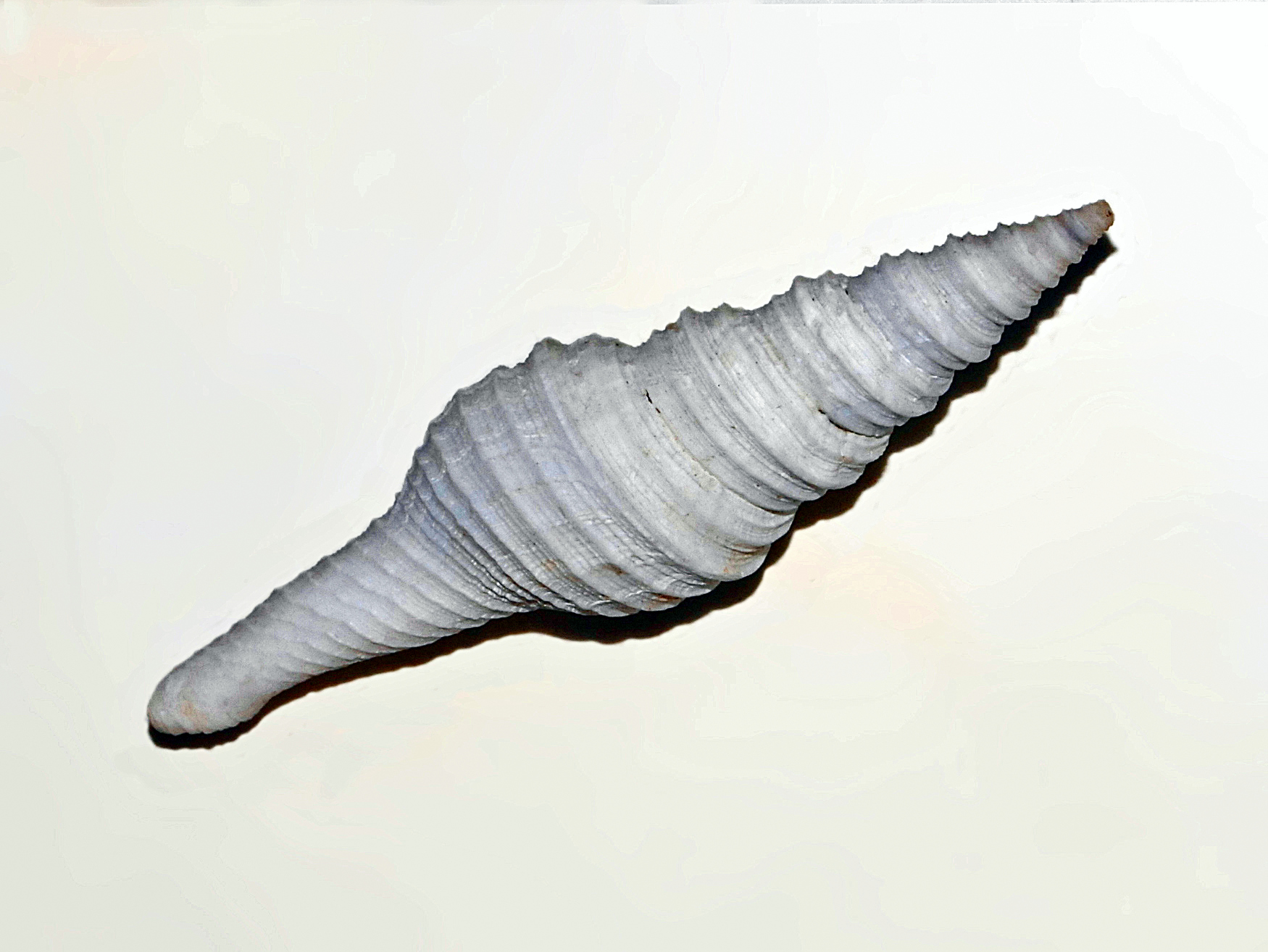
A shell of Polystira albida

Shells of Polystira albida can reach a size of 44–127 millimetres (1.7–5.0 in). These large shells are slender, fusiform, with a narrow and long aperture and a white external surface.

== Habitat ==
These tropical benthic gastropods live at depths of 15 to 229 m.

== Life cycle ==
Embryos develop into free-swimming planktonic marine larvae (trochophore) and later into juvenile veligers.

== Bibliography ==
- John Tucker – Catalog of Recent & Fossil Turrids
- Lamarck, J. B. 1816. Tableau Encyclopédique et Méthodique des Trois Règnes de la Nature – Veuve Agasse: Paris.
- Norman A. Meinkoth – Audubon – Field Guide to North American Shells
- Perry, G. 1811. – Conchology – William Miller: London.
- Petuch, E. J. 1987. New Caribbean molluscan faunas – Coastal Education & Research Foundation: Charlottesville, Virginia.
- Reeve, L. 1843. Monograph of the genus Pleurotoma Conchologia Iconica
- Todd J.A. & Rawlings T.A. (2014). A review of the Polystira clade — the Neotropic's largest marine gastropod radiation (Neogastropoda: Conoidea: Turridae sensu stricto). Zootaxa. 3884(5): 445–491.,
- Turgeon, D. D., J. F. Quinn Jr., A. E. Bogan, E. V. Coan, F. G. Hochberg, W. G. Lyons, et al. (1998) – Common and scientific names of aquatic invertebrates from the United States and Canada: Mollusks, 2nd ed. – American Fisheries Society Special Publication
