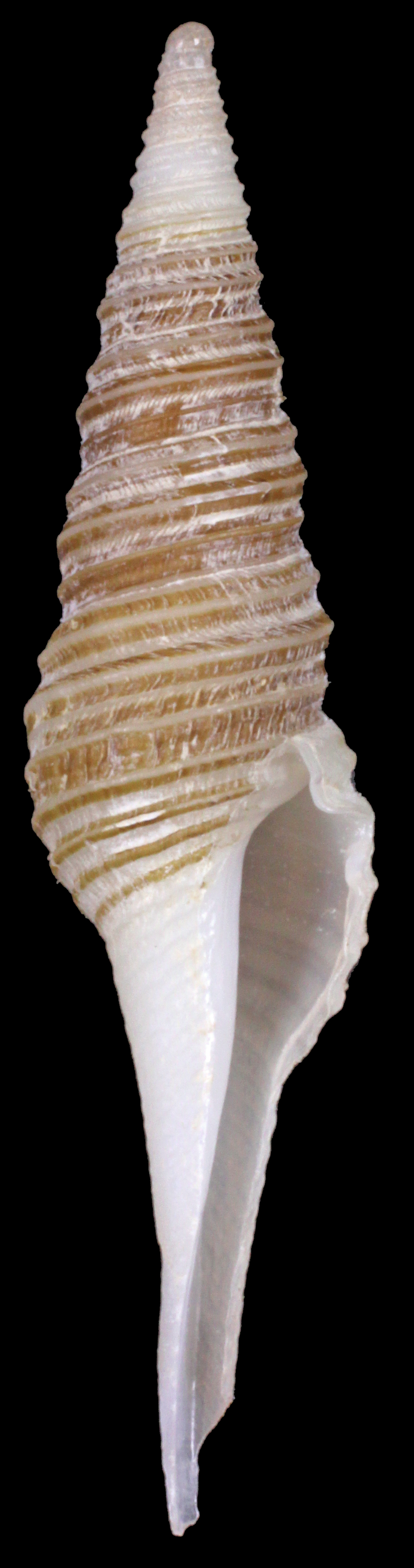
- Shell of Polystira starretti (specimen at MNHN, Paris)

Scientific classification
- Kingdom: Animalia
- Phylum: Mollusca
- Class: Gastropoda
- Subclass: Caenogastropoda
- Order: Neogastropoda
- Family: Turridae
- Genus: Polystira
- Species: P. starretti

Binomial name
- Polystira starretti Petuch, 2002

Synonyms
- Polystira staretti Petuch, 2002 (misspelling)

= Polystira starretti =

Species of gastropod

Polystira starretti is a species of sea snail, a marine gastropod mollusk in the family Turridae, the turrids.

== Distribution ==
This marine species has a wide distribution and occurs east of Florida Keys, USA, off French Guiana and Colombia.
