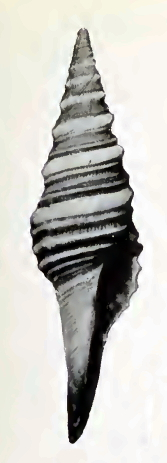
- Original image of a shell of Polystira florencae

Scientific classification
- Kingdom: Animalia
- Phylum: Mollusca
- Class: Gastropoda
- Subclass: Caenogastropoda
- Order: Neogastropoda
- Family: Turridae
- Genus: Polystira
- Species: P. florencae

Binomial name
- Polystira florencae Bartsch, 1934

= Polystira florencae =

Species of gastropod

Polystira florencae is a species of sea snail, a marine gastropod mollusk in the family Turridae, the turrids.

== Description ==
The length of the shell varies between 17 mm and 30 mm.

(Original description) The rather large shell has a fusiform shape. It is, pale brown, excepting the large median keel between summit and suture and a broad area that extends over a little more than half of the posterior part of the columella, which are white. The tops of the other spiral keels are also a trifle paler than the spaces between them. The first 1.5 whorls of the protoconch are large, well rounded, and smooth. These are followed by about one half of a turn that is crossed by about 10 slightly retractively curved, axial ribs, which are about one fourth as wide as the spaces that separate them. The postnuclear whorls are marked by very strong spiral keels, of which the most conspicuous one is the second one below the summit, which bears the deeply narrow posterior sinus. The first keel occupies the space almost midway between the summit and this keel. Anterior to the strong keel, there are on each whorl two additional keels, one, the stronger, occupying the periphery of the whorls, another a little nearer to the strong second keel than the peripheral and slightly weaker than the peripheral. A slender spiral thread is present midway between the summit and the first, and between the second and third; and two are present between the third and fourth. The spaces between the keels are decidedly concave, and they are crossed by slender, axial riblets, which are retractively curved posterior to the strong keel and protractively curved anterior to it. In addition to this the whorls are marked by microscopic lines of growth and spiral striations. The base is short and marked by four keels, which grow consecutively weaker anteriorly. In the middle of the broad spaces between these keels is a slender spiral thread. A continuation of the axial sculpture of the spire is present here. The columella is rather long, slender, and marked by oblique spiral cords, which grow consecutively weaker anteriorly, becoming obsolete toward the anterior tip. This also holds good for the continuation of the axial sculpture, which likewise becomes enfeebled and obsolete. The aperture is narrow and long. The outer lip is deeply incised to form the narrow sinus of the second keel and scalloped by the rest of the keels and cords. The inner lip is thin, reflected over and appressed to the columella. The parietal wall is covered by a moderately thick callus.

== Distribution ==
P. florencae can be found in Caribbean waters, ranging from the Bahamas south to Brazil.
