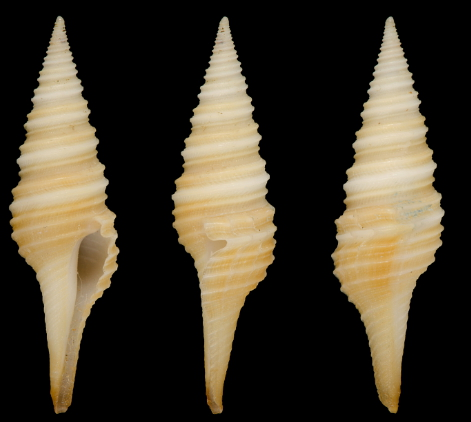
- Shell of Polystira sunderlandi (holotype at the Smithsonian Institution)

Scientific classification
- Kingdom: Animalia
- Phylum: Mollusca
- Class: Gastropoda
- Subclass: Caenogastropoda
- Order: Neogastropoda
- Family: Turridae
- Genus: Polystira
- Species: P. sunderlandi

Binomial name
- Polystira sunderlandi Petuch, 1987

= Polystira sunderlandi =

Species of gastropod

Polystira sunderlandi is a species of sea snail, a marine gastropod mollusk in the family Turridae, the turrids.

== Description ==
Original description: "Shell small for genus, fusiform, elongate, with high, elevated spire; 6 raised, bladelike, spiral cords on body whorl; spire whorls with 3 cords: cords all equally-spaced and equal-sized; siphonal canal long, straight, with numerous small spiral cords and spiral threads; anal notch narrow, deep, aligned with second cord; shell color light brown with single narrow white band that corresponds to second cord from suture; siphonal canal tan with dark brown anterior tip; interior of aperture tan."

== Distribution ==
Locus typicus: "(Dredged from) 150 metres depth 50 kilometres South of Apalachicola, Florida, USA."

This marine species occurs in the North Atlantic Ocean off Florida at a depth of 150 m.
