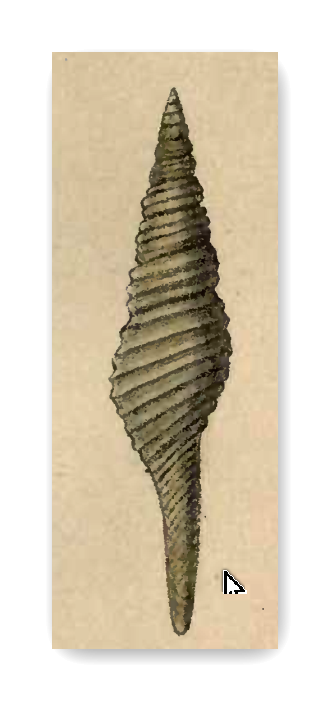
- Drawing of a shell of Polystira antillarum

Scientific classification
- Kingdom: Animalia
- Phylum: Mollusca
- Class: Gastropoda
- Subclass: Caenogastropoda
- Order: Neogastropoda
- Superfamily: Conoidea
- Family: Turridae
- Genus: Polystira
- Species: P. antillarum

Binomial name
- Polystira antillarum (Crosse, 1865)

Synonyms
- Pleurotoma antillarum Crosse, 1865 (non d'Orbigny, 1848)

= Polystira antillarum =

Species of gastropod

Polystira antillarum is a species of sea snail, a marine gastropod mollusk in the family Turridae, the turrids.

== Description ==
(Description of Pleurotoma virgo) The shell is ridged and striated, the central ridge forming a carina. The shell is usually glossy white, but when covered by its epidermis corneous.

== Distribution ==
This marine species occurs in the West Indies (Guadeloupe).
