= Polystira artia =

Scientific classification
- Kingdom: Animalia
- Phylum: Mollusca
- Class: Gastropoda
- Subclass: Caenogastropoda
- Order: Neogastropoda
- Superfamily: Conoidea
- Family: Turridae
- Genus: Polystira
- Species: P. artia

Binomial name
- Polystira artia Berry, 1957

Species of gastropod

Polystira artia is a species of sea snail, a marine gastropod mollusk in the family Turridae, the turrids.

The paratype is located at the USNM.

== Distribution ==
This species occurs at Baja California, Mexico.
