= Megalophaedusa spelaeonis =

Conservation status
- Data Deficient (IUCN 2.3)

Scientific classification
- Kingdom: Animalia
- Phylum: Mollusca
- Class: Gastropoda
- Order: Stylommatophora
- Family: Clausiliidae
- Genus: Megalophaedusa
- Species: M. spelaeonis

Binomial name
- Megalophaedusa spelaeonis (Kuroda & Minato, 1975)

Synonyms
- Megalophaedusa (Mundiphaedusa) spelaeonis (Kuroda & Minato, 1975) (unaccepted combination); Megalophaedusa (Neophaedusa) spelaeonis (Kuroda & Minato, 1975) · alternate representation; Mesozaptyx spelaeonis Kuroda & Minato, 1975; Neophaedusa spelaeonis Kuroda & Minato, 1975 (original combination)

Species of gastropod

Megalophaedusa spelaeonis, in Japanese: Kazaanagiseru (カザアナギセル, Kazaanagiseru), is a species of small, air-breathing land snail, terrestrial pulmonate gastropod mollusk in the family Clausiliidae, the door snails, all of which have a clausilium.

== Description ==
The height of the shell is 10–11 mm. The width of the shell is 2.5–3 mm.

Red marks the location of Kumamoto Prefecture, where Neophaedusa spelaeonis is endemic.

== Distribution ==
This species is endemic to central part of Kumamoto Prefecture, Kyushu, Japan.

It is endangered species (CR+EN) in Japan.

== Ecology ==
It lives in limestone caves.
