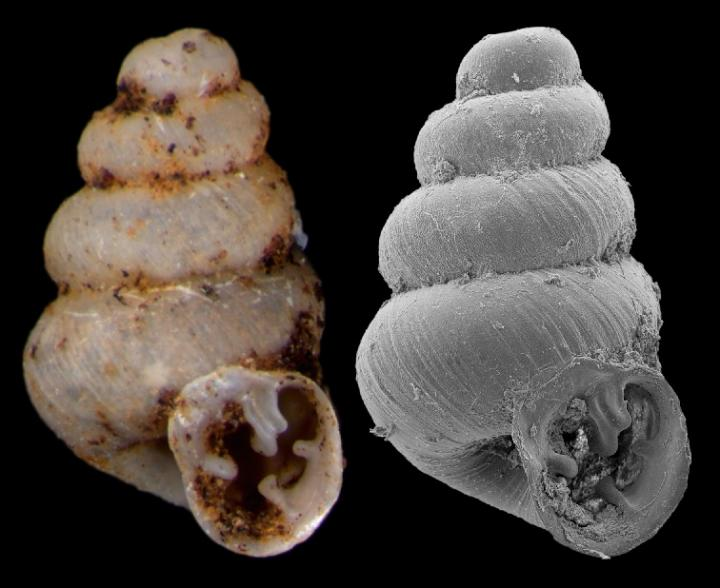
- The shell of Gastrocopta sharae, seen under a light microscope (left) and under a scanning electron microscope (right)

Scientific classification
- Kingdom: Animalia
- Phylum: Mollusca
- Class: Gastropoda
- Order: Stylommatophora
- Family: Gastrocoptidae
- Genus: Gastrocopta
- Species: G. sharae

Binomial name
- Gastrocopta sharae Salvador, Cavallari & Simone, 2017

= Gastrocopta sharae =

Species of gastropod

Gastrocopta sharae is a species of very small air-breathing land snails, a terrestrial pulmonate gastropod mollusc in the family Gastrocoptidae.

== Etymology ==
The specific name sharae is a reference to Shar, a fictional deity in the Dungeons & Dragons Forgotten Realms campaign setting.

== Distribution ==
This species is known only from its type locality, Gruta Revolucionários, a cave located in Goiás state, Brazil.
