= Volvarina jibara =

Scientific classification
- Kingdom: Animalia
- Phylum: Mollusca
- Class: Gastropoda
- Subclass: Caenogastropoda
- Order: Neogastropoda
- Family: Marginellidae
- Subfamily: Marginellinae
- Genus: Volvarina
- Species: V. jibara

Binomial name
- Volvarina jibara Espinosa, Ortea & Diez, 2017

Species of gastropod

Volvarina jibara is a species of sea snail, a marine gastropod mollusk in the family Marginellidae, the margin snails.

== Description ==
The length of the shell attains 9.7 mm, its diameter is 4.8 mm.

== Distribution ==
This marine species occurs off Cuba, Caribbean Sea.
