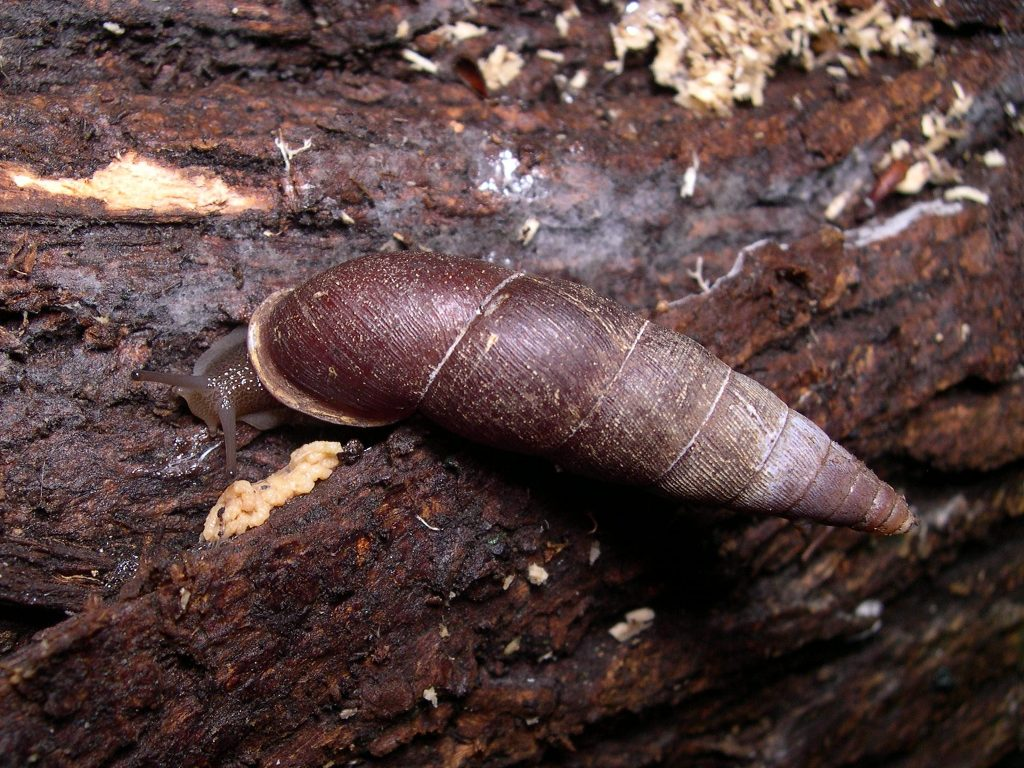
- Megalophaedusa martensi. The individual in the photo has a shell 45.5 mm long and weighs 3.2g with the soft parts intact.

Scientific classification
- Domain: Eukaryota
- Kingdom: Animalia
- Phylum: Mollusca
- Class: Gastropoda
- Order: Stylommatophora
- Family: Clausiliidae
- Genus: Megalophaedusa; Boettger, 1877

Synonyms
- Aprosphyma A. J. Wagner, 1920 (junior synonym); Clausilia (Megalophaedusa) O. Boettger, 1877; Decolliphaedusa Azuma, 1982; Hemiphaedusa (Pinguiphaedusa) Azuma, 1982; Hemiphaedusa (Placeophaedusa) Minato, 1994; Megalophaedusa (Aulacophaedusa) Habe, 1958 · alternate representation; Megalophaedusa (Dimphaedusa) Motochin & Ueshima, 2017 · alternate representation; Megalophaedusa (Megalophaedusa) O. Boettger, 1877 · alternate representation; Megalophaedusa (Mesozaptyx) Kuroda, 1963 (not available: nomen nudum); Megalophaedusa (Mundiphaedusa) Minato, 1979; Megalophaedusa (Neophaedusa) Kuroda & Minato, 1975 · alternate representation; Megalophadeusa (Pauciphaedusa) Minato & Habe, 1983 · alternate representation; Megalophaedusa (Pinguiphaedusa) Azuma, 1982 · alternate representation; Megalophaedusa (Tyrannophaedusa) Pilsbry, 1900 · alternate representation; Megalophaedusa (Tyrannophaedusoides) Motochin & Ueshima, 2017 · alternate representation; Megalophaedusa (Ventriphaedusa) Azuma, 1982 · alternate representation; Megalophaedusa (Vitriphaedusa) Azuma, 1982 · alternate representation; Mundiphaedusa Minato, 1979; Mundiphaedusa (Aulacophaedusa) Habe, 1958; Neophaedusa Kuroda & Minato, 1975 (original rank); Pauciphaedusa Minato & Habe, 1983; Pinguiphaedusa Azuma, 1982; Spinulaphaedusa Minato, 1994; Tyrannophaedusa Pilsbry, 1900; Tyrannophaedusa (Aulacophaedusa) Habe, 1958; Tyrannophaedusa (Decolliphaedusa) Azuma, 1982; Tyrannophaedusa (Tyrannophaedusa) Pilsbry, 1900; Ventriphaedusa Azuma, 1982; Vitriphaedusa Azuma, 1982

= Megalophaedusa =

Genus of gastropods

Megalophaedusa is a genus of medium-sized air-breathing land snails, terrestrial pulmonate gastropod mollusks in the family Clausiliidae, the door snails, all of which have a clausilium.

This genus occurs in Japan.

== Species ==
Species within the genus Megalophaedusa include:

- Megalophaedusa concrescens (Pilsbry 1905)
- Megalophaedusa hickanis mikawa Pilsbry 1905
- Megalophaedusa hiraseana (Pilsbry 1901)
- Megalophaedusa martensi (Von Martens 1860)
  - Megalophaedusa martensi tinctilabris (Pilsbry 1902)
- Megalophaedusa spelaeonis (Kuroda & Minato, 1975)
- Megalophaedusa vasta Boettger 1877
- Megalophaedusa yokohamensis (Crosse 1876)
