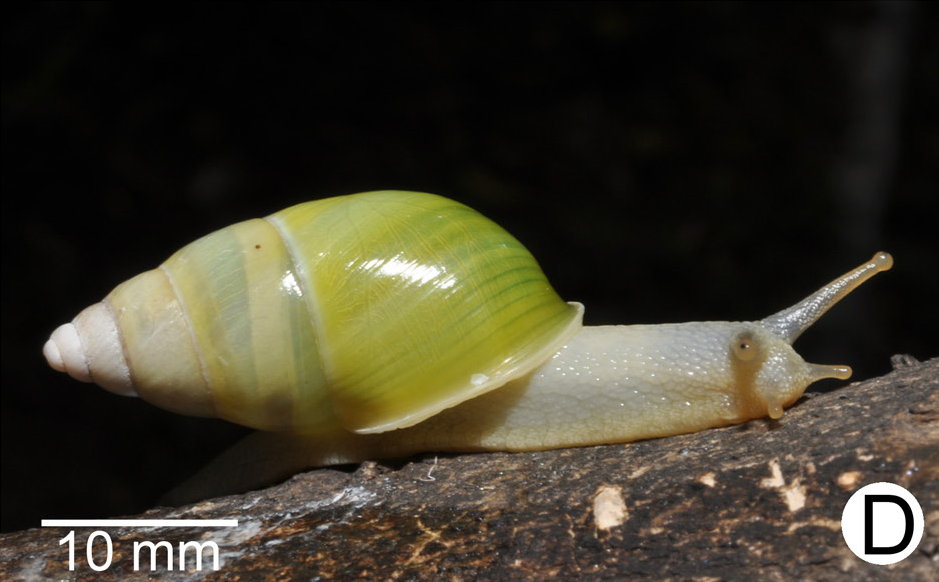
- Amphidromus syndromoideus holotype

Scientific classification
- Kingdom: Animalia
- Phylum: Mollusca
- Class: Gastropoda
- Order: Stylommatophora
- Family: Camaenidae
- Genus: Amphidromus
- Species: A. syndromoideus

Binomial name
- Amphidromus syndromoideus Inkhavilay & Panha, 2017

= Amphidromus syndromoideus =

Species of gastropod

Amphidromus syndromoideus is a species of air-breathing land snail, a terrestrial pulmonate gastropod mollusc in the family Camaenidae.

== Distribution ==
Distribution of Amphidromus syndromoideus include Khammouan Province in Laos.

== Description ==
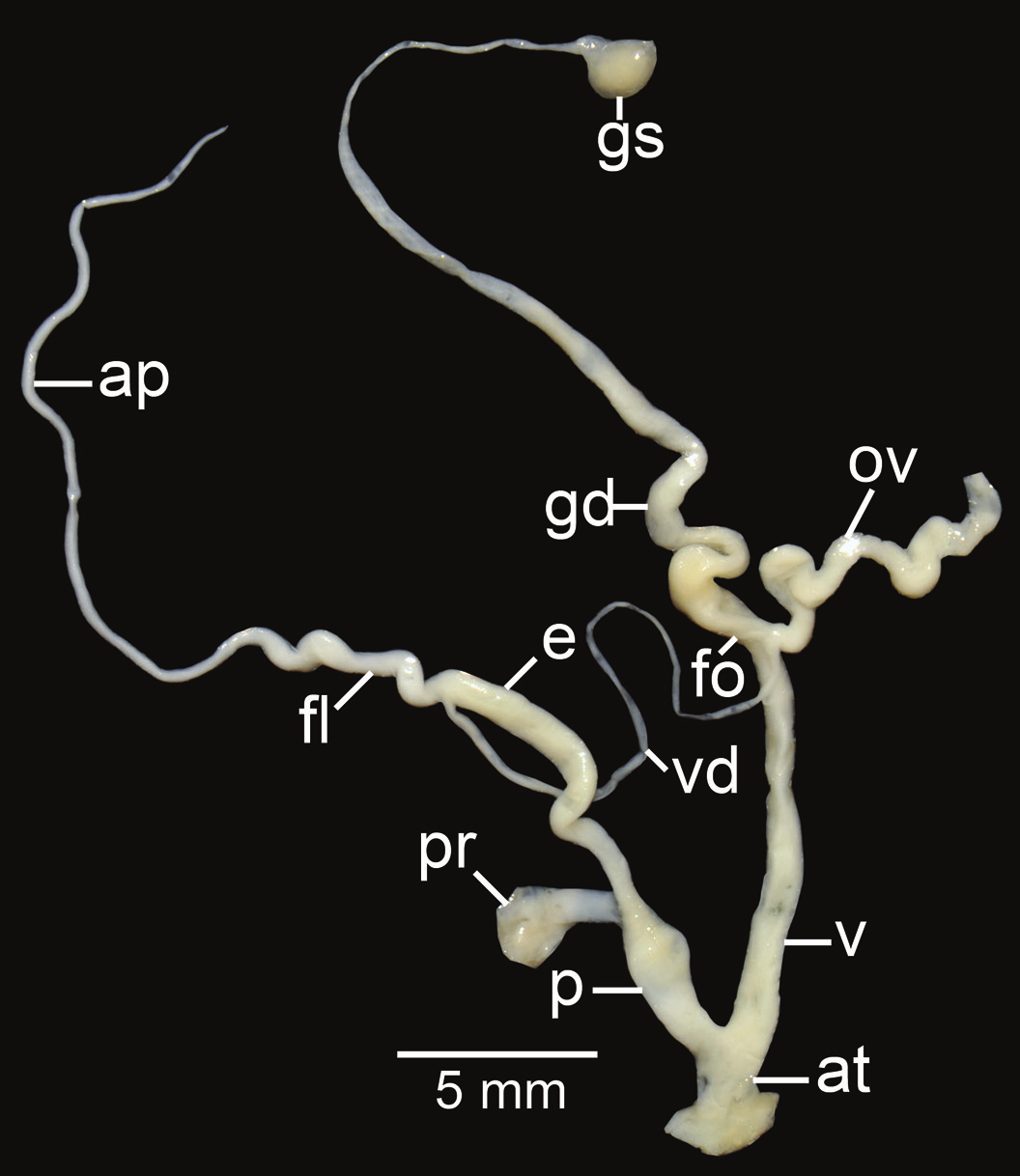
Reproductive system of Amphidromus syndromoideus.
