= Alvania marmarisensis =

Scientific classification
- Kingdom: Animalia
- Phylum: Mollusca
- Class: Gastropoda
- Subclass: Caenogastropoda
- Order: Littorinimorpha
- Superfamily: Rissooidea
- Family: Rissoidae
- Genus: Alvania
- Species: A. marmarisensis

Binomial name
- Alvania marmarisensis Bitlis & Öztürk, 2017

Species of gastropod

Alvania marmarisensis is a species of minute sea snail, a marine gastropod mollusk or micromollusk in the family Rissoidae.

== Distribution ==
This species occurs in the Aegean Sea off Greece and Turkey.
