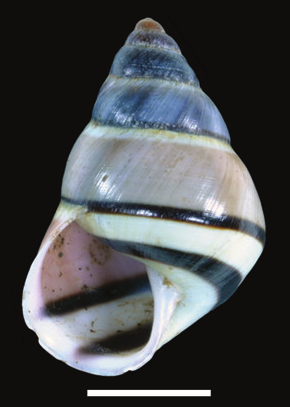
- Aegistohadra roemeri holotype shell. Scale bar is 10 mm.

Scientific classification
- Kingdom: Animalia
- Phylum: Mollusca
- Class: Gastropoda
- Order: Stylommatophora
- Family: Camaenidae
- Genus: Aegistohadra
- Species: A. roemeri

Binomial name
- Aegistohadra roemeri (L. Pfeiffer, 1863)

Synonyms
- Amphidromus (Syndromus) roemeri (L. Pfeiffer, 1863) superseded combination; Amphidromus (Syndromus) xiengkhaungensis Inkhavilay & Panha, 2017 junior subjective synonym; Amphidromus roemeri (L. Pfeiffer, 1863) superseded combination; Amphidromus xiengkhaungensis Inkhavilay & Panha, 2017 junior subjective synonym; Bulimus roemeri L. Pfeiffer, 1863 superseded combination (original combination)

= Aegistohadra roemeri =

Species of gastropod

Aegistohadra roemeri is a species of air-breathing land snail, a terrestrial pulmonate gastropod mollusc in the family Camaenidae.

It has been described according to empty shells only.

== Description ==
The length of the shell attains 23.5 mm, its diameter 13.5 mm.

(Original description in Latin) The sinistral shell is perforate, and ovate-conical. It appears somewhat solid and lightly striate, and exhibiting a decussately patterned surface under a lens due to very close spiral striae. Its color is flesh-colored, with a pale band at the suture. The spire is conical, with a rather acute apex. Comprising six scarcely convex whorls, the body whorl almost equals the spire and appears somewhat angled below the middle, displaying two reddish-brown bands and a rounded base. The aperture is oblique and ear-shaped; the peristome is simple, with the outer margin shortly expanded and the columellar margin somewhat vertical, dilated above, and arch-like reflected.

== Distribution ==
Distribution of Aegistohadra roemeri include Phou Kout District within Xiangkhouang Province in Laos and Cambodia.
