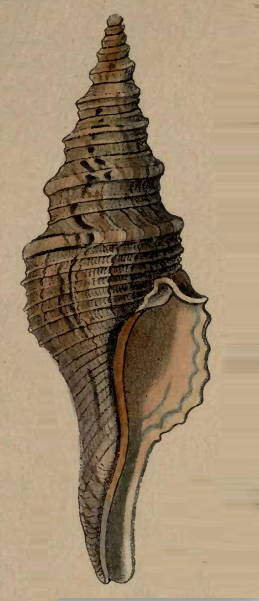
- Drawing of a shell of Polystira oxytropis

Scientific classification
- Kingdom: Animalia
- Phylum: Mollusca
- Class: Gastropoda
- Subclass: Caenogastropoda
- Order: Neogastropoda
- Family: Turridae
- Genus: Polystira
- Species: P. oxytropis

Binomial name
- Polystira oxytropis (Sowerby I, 1834)

Synonyms
- Pleuroliria artia Berry, 1957 ·; Pleuroliria parthenia Berry, 1957; Pleurotoma albicarinata G. B. Sowerby II, 1870; Pleurotoma oxytropis Sowerby I, 1834

= Polystira oxytropis =

Species of gastropod

Polystira oxytropis is a species of sea snail, a marine gastropod mollusk in the family Turridae, the turrids.

== Description ==
The horn-colored shell contains several sharp keels and numerous spiral raised lines. The upper keel is the strongest, angulating the whorls, the surface concave above it.

P. oxytropis is considered an "umbrella species" with considerable diversity as shown by DNA sequence data coupled with conchological studies.

== Distribution ==
This is an Eastern Pacific species, occurring off Western Mexico, in the Gulf of Panama and the Pacific coast of Colombia.
