= Volvarina granmaense =

Scientific classification
- Kingdom: Animalia
- Phylum: Mollusca
- Class: Gastropoda
- Subclass: Caenogastropoda
- Order: Neogastropoda
- Family: Marginellidae
- Subfamily: Marginellinae
- Genus: Volvarina
- Species: V. granmaense

Binomial name
- Volvarina granmaense Espinosa, Ortea & Diez, 2017

Species of gastropod

Volvarina granmaense is a species of sea snail, a marine gastropod mollusk in the family Marginellidae, the margin snails.

== Description ==
The length of the shell attains 5.5 mm, its diameter is 1.9 mm.

== Distribution ==
This marine species occurs off Cuba, Caribbean Sea.
