= Polystira jaguaella =

Scientific classification
- Kingdom: Animalia
- Phylum: Mollusca
- Class: Gastropoda
- Subclass: Caenogastropoda
- Order: Neogastropoda
- Superfamily: Conoidea
- Family: Turridae
- Genus: Polystira
- Species: P. jaguaella

Binomial name
- Polystira jaguaella Espinosa, Ortea & Moro, 2017

Species of gastropod

Polystira jaguaella is a species of sea snail, a marine gastropod mollusk in the family Turridae, the turrids.

== Description ==
The length of the shell attains 20 mm.

== Distribution ==
This marine species occurs off Cuba.
