= Polystira picta =

Scientific classification
- Kingdom: Animalia
- Phylum: Mollusca
- Class: Gastropoda
- Subclass: Caenogastropoda
- Order: Neogastropoda
- Family: Turridae
- Genus: Polystira
- Species: P. picta

Binomial name
- Polystira picta (Reeve, 1843)

Synonyms
- Pleurotoma picta Reeve, 1843; Turris rombergii Mörch, O.A.L., 1857

Species of gastropod

Polystira picta is a species of sea snail, a marine gastropod mollusk in the family Turridae, the turrids.

== Description ==
The size of an adult shell varies between 36 mm and 57 mm. The shell somewhat more carinated than Turris grandis, with less numerous revolving ribs. The color of the shell is yellowish white with chestnut-brown spots upon the larger ribs, the spots often coalescing into irregular longitudinal stripes.

== Distribution ==
This marine species occurs in the Gulf of California, Western Mexico to Colombia.

It has been found in the shallow subtidal waters of the Gulf of Tehuantepec.
