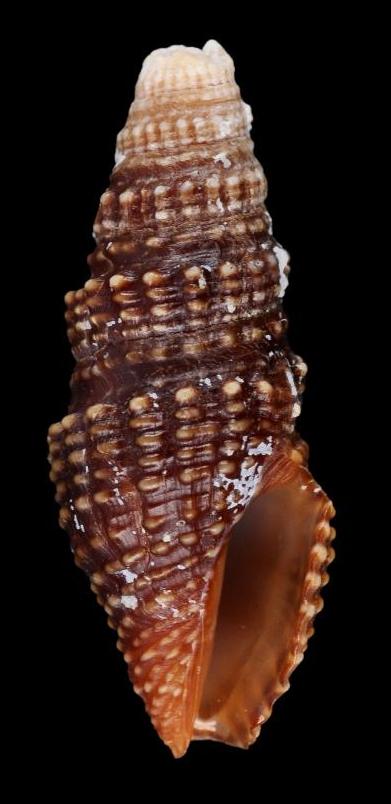
- Shells of Crassispira scala (museum specimens at MNHN, Paris)

Scientific classification
- Kingdom: Animalia
- Phylum: Mollusca
- Class: Gastropoda
- Subclass: Caenogastropoda
- Order: Neogastropoda
- Superfamily: Conoidea
- Family: Pseudomelatomidae
- Genus: Crassispira
- Species: C. scala

Binomial name
- Crassispira scala Kantor, Stahlschmidt, Aznar-Cormano, Bouchet & Puillandre, 2017

= Crassispira scala =

Species of gastropod

Crassispira scala is a species of sea snail, a marine gastropod mollusk in the family Pseudomelatomidae.

== Description ==
The length of the shell varies between 15 mm and 30 mm.

== Distribution ==
This marine species occurs off the Philippines, Papua New Guinea, New Caledonia, Vanuatu and Micronesia.
