= Zaptyx =

- Zaptyx buschii

Scientific classification
- Kingdom: Animalia
- Phylum: Mollusca
- Class: Gastropoda
- Order: Stylommatophora
- Family: Clausiliidae
- Subfamily: Phaedusinae
- Tribe: Phaedusini
- Genus: Zaptyx; Pilsbry, 1900

Type species
- Clausilia hirasei

Species
- see text

Synonyms
- List: Clausilia (Diceratoptyx) Pilsbry, 1905; Clausilia (Hemizaptyx) Pilsbry, 1905; Clausilia (Heterozaptyx) Pilsbry, 1906; Clausilia (Idiozaptyx) Pilsbry, 1909; Clausilia (Metazaptyx) Pilsbry, 1905; Clausilia (Oligozaptyx) Pilsbry, 1905; Clausilia (Parazaptyx) Pilsbry, 1905; Clausilia (Selenoptyx) Pilsbry, 1908; Clausilia (Stereozaptyx) Pilsbry, 1905; Clausilia (Thaumatoptyx) Pilsbry, 1908; Clausilia (Zaptyx) Pilsbry, 1900; Diceratoptyx Pilsbry, 1905; Hemiphaedusa (Hemizaptyx) Pilsbry, 1905; Hemizaptyx Pilsbry, 1905; Heterozaptyx Pilsbry, 1906; Idiozaptyx Pilsbry, 1909; Metazaptyx Pilsbry, 1905; Oligozaptyx Pilsbry, 1905; Paganizaptyx Azuma, 1982; Parazaptyx Pilsbry, 1905; Pulchraptyx Minato, 1981; Selenoptyx Pilsbry, 1908; Stereozaptyx Pilsbry, 1905; Thaumatoptyx Pilsbry, 1908; Tyrannozaptyx Käufel, 1930; Zaptychopsis Ehrmann, 1927

Genus of land snail

Zaptyx is a genus of small land snails in the family Clausiliidae (door snails). The genus was established by the American malacologist Henry Augustus Pilsbry in 1900. Members of this genus are important for studying island biogeography due to their high level of endemism across the Western Pacific islands.

== General characteristics ==
Zaptyx generally measure under 14 mm (0.55 in) in shell height. The shells are typically sinistral (left-handed), slender, and fusiform.

The shell is small. The superior lamella is widely separated from the spiral lamella, and both a fulcrum and a parallel lamella are developed. Sutural plicae are present. The upper palatal plica is either independent from or united with the well-developed lunella, and there is no lower palatal plica.

The clausilium is tongue-shaped and is about twice as long as it is wide, featuring subparallel lateral margins. The apex is much thickened on the columellar side. Posteriorly, it is emarginate or auriculate on both sides of the filament, or on the columellar side only. The structure is straight distally, but it bends abruptly and strongly near the filament.

== Distribution ==
The genus Zaptyx is distributed across East Asia and Southeast Asia. Species diversity is highest in Japan, Taiwan, and the Philippines. Several taxa also occur on the Korean Peninsula.

== Taxonomy ==
The genus Zaptyx has numerous synonyms, and species within the group frequently have various synonymous names as a result. For example, the subspecies Zaptyx stimpsoni ullungdoensis, endemic to Korea, was originally described in 1991 under the synonym Paganizaptyx miyanagai ullungdoensis, before being reclassified to its current valid name.

== Species ==
As of 2026, the genus Zaptyx includes the following species:

- Zaptyx adulta (Käufel, 1930)
- Zaptyx alloptyx (H. Nordsieck, 2003)
- Zaptyx annae Loosjes, 1950
- Zaptyx aptyx (H. Nordsieck, 2003)
- Zaptyx asperata (Pilsbry, 1905)
- Zaptyx auffenbergi Batomalaque & Rosenberg, 2018
- Zaptyx bagsana (Schmacker & O. Boettger, 1891)
- Zaptyx bivincta (Pilsbry, 1908)
- Zaptyx buschii (Küster, 1844)
- Zaptyx changi (H. Nordsieck, 2003)
- Zaptyx cladoptyx (Pilsbry, 1905)
- Zaptyx costellata (H. Nordsieck, 2005)
- Zaptyx crassilamellata Kuroda, 1941
- Zaptyx daemonorum (Pilsbry, 1902)
- Zaptyx daitojimana Kuroda, 1960
- Zaptyx deminuta (Käufel, 1930)
- Zaptyx diacoptyx (Pilsbry, 1908)
- Zaptyx dolichoptyx (Pilsbry, 1908)
- Zaptyx entospira (Pilsbry, 1901)
- Zaptyx euptyx (H. Nordsieck, 2003)
- Zaptyx exodonta (Pilsbry, 1909)
- Zaptyx exulans (Pilsbry, 1908)
- Zaptyx gochishanensis (K.-M. Chang, 1999)
- Zaptyx gonyptyx (H. Nordsieck, 2003)
- Zaptyx hachijoensis (Pilsbry, 1901)
- Zaptyx hedleyi (Pilsbry, 1905)
- Zaptyx hemmeni (H. Nordsieck, 2005)
- Zaptyx heudeana (Möllendorff, 1882)
- Zaptyx hirasei (Pilsbry, 1900)
- Zaptyx hyperaptyx (Pilsbry, 1905)
- Zaptyx hyperoptyx (Pilsbry, 1900)
- Zaptyx ilanensis (H. Nordsieck, 2003)
- Zaptyx inversiluna (Pilsbry, 1908)
- Zaptyx jamesi Batomalaque & Rosenberg, 2018
- Zaptyx kanaganensis (K.-M. Chang, 1980)
- Zaptyx kikaiensis (Pilsbry, 1905)
- Zaptyx kosakai (Kuroda, 1941)
- Zaptyx kotoshoensis Kuroda, 1932
- Zaptyx kuanmini (Y.-C. Lee & W.-L. Wu, 2003)
- Zaptyx kusakakiensis (Minato, 1982)
- Zaptyx lini (K.-M. Chang & Tada, 2000)
- Zaptyx litouensis (K.-M. Chang & Ookubo, 2004)
- Zaptyx longiplicata (Pilsbry, 1908)
- Zaptyx lushanensis (K.-M. Chang & Maeda, 1982)
- Zaptyx maanliauensis (K.-M. Chang & W.-K. Wu, 1978)
- Zaptyx magaensis (K.-M. Chang, 1991)
- Zaptyx minuta (Yen, 1939)
- Zaptyx mirabilis (H. Nordsieck, 2003)
- Zaptyx montuosa (H. Nordsieck, 2003)
- Zaptyx munus (Pilsbry, 1901)
- Zaptyx myersi (Schmacker & O. Boettger, 1891)
- Zaptyx nakanoshimana (Pilsbry, 1909)
- Zaptyx noviluna (Pilsbry, 1908)
- Zaptyx oligoptyx (H. Nordsieck, 2003)
- Zaptyx ooi (Kuroda, 1941)
- Zaptyx orthoptyx (H. Nordsieck, 2003)
- Zaptyx oxypomatica (Pilsbry, 1908)
- Zaptyx paraptyx (H. Nordsieck, 2003)
- Zaptyx pattalus (Pilsbry, 1905)
- Zaptyx pinto (Pilsbry, 1901)
- Zaptyx polita (Käufel, 1930)
- Zaptyx pseudosheridani (Zilch, 1954)
- Zaptyx ptychocyma (Pilsbry, 1901)
- Zaptyx pumilio (H. Nordsieck, 2003)
- Zaptyx purissima (Pilsbry, 1905)
- Zaptyx rehderi Loosjes, 1950
- Zaptyx saccatibasis (Pilsbry, 1909)
- Zaptyx santiaoensis K.-M. Chang, 1982
- Zaptyx sarissa (Pilsbry, 1905)
- Zaptyx similaris (H. Adams, 1867)
- Zaptyx stimpsoni (A. Adams, 1868)
- Zaptyx strictaluna (O. Boettger, 1877)
- Zaptyx subignobilis (Pilsbry, 1902)
- Zaptyx taibuensis (K.-M. Chang & Tada, 2005)
- Zaptyx takahasii Kuroda, 1932
- Zaptyx takarai Kuroda, 1960
- Zaptyx tantaensis (K.-M. Chang & W.-K. Wu, 1977)
- Zaptyx tantilla (Pilsbry, 1902)
- Zaptyx thaumatopoma (Pilsbry, 1905)
- Zaptyx thompsoni Batomalaque & Rosenberg, 2018
- Zaptyx uraniscoptyx (Schmacker & O. Boettger, 1891)
- Zaptyx wenderi (Y.-C. Lee & W.-L. Wu, 2005)
- Zaptyx yaeyamensis (Pilsbry, 1905)
- Zaptyx ypsilonptyx (H. Nordsieck, 2003)
- Zaptyx yukitai (K. Uozumi & A. Yamamoto, 1993)
