= Hotel de Paris, Cromer =

Hotel in Cromer, Norfolk

Hotel de Paris
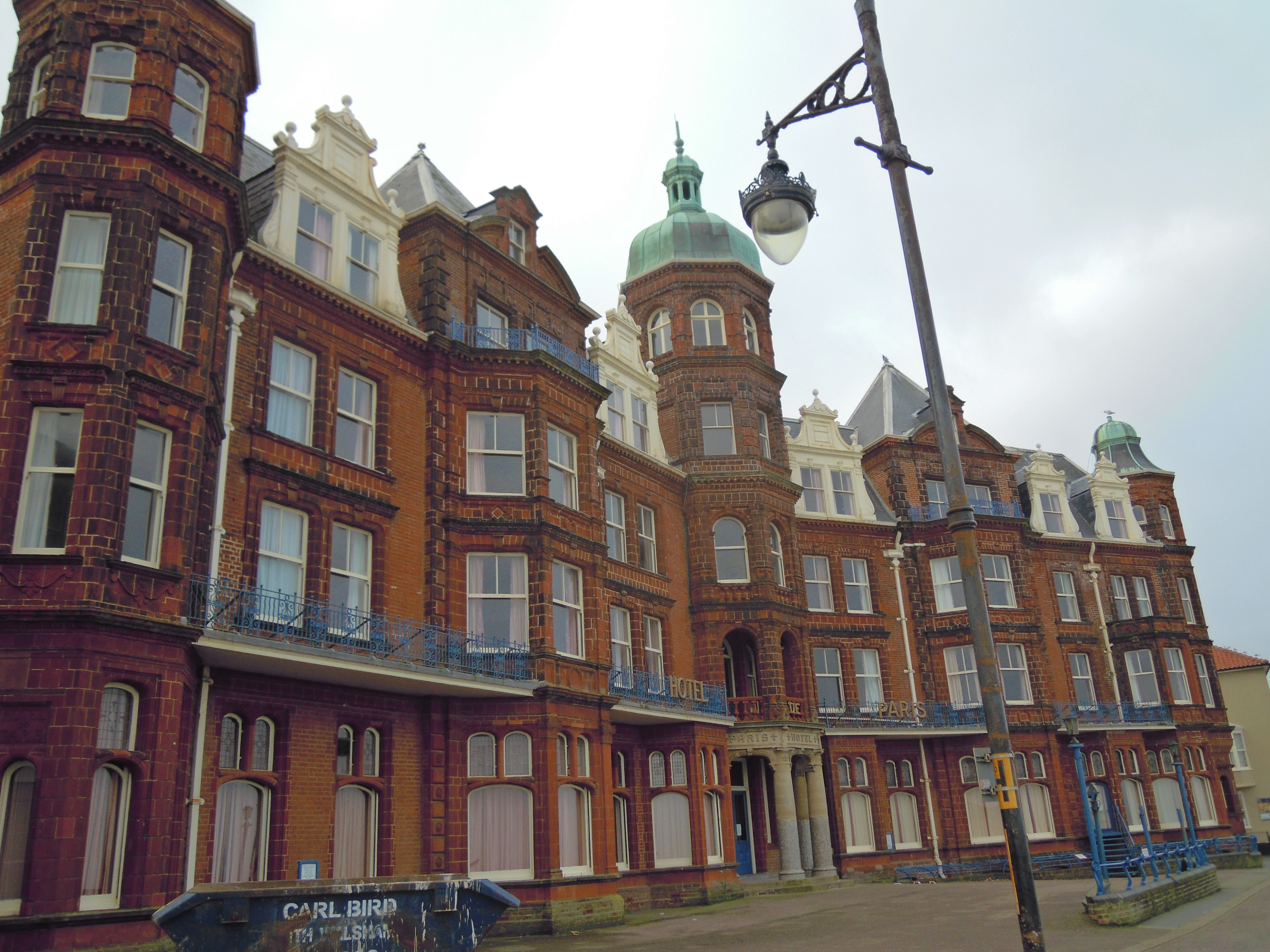

- Norfolk

General information
- Location: Cromer, Norfolk, England, High Street; Cromer; Norfolk; NR27 9HG
- Coordinates: 52°55′56.67″N 1°18′2.73″E
- Opened: 1830
- Operator: Leisureplex Hotels

Technical details
- Floor count: 4

Design and construction
- Architect: George John Skipper
- Developer: Smith's of Norwich

Other information
- Number of rooms: 61
- Number of restaurants: 1
- Parking: Yes but limited

Website
- Hotel Website

Listed Building – Grade II
- Designated: 21 January 1977
- Reference no.: 1171691

The Hotel de Paris is a hotel in the English seaside town of Cromer in the county of Norfolk, United Kingdom. It has an AA three-star rating.

== Location ==
The Hotel de Paris sits in a commanding cliff top position in the centre of Cromer at the head of the town's Victorian pier. It has views over the beach and out to sea. The hotel is 0.5 miles (0.80 km) from Cromer railway station. The nearest airport is in Norwich and is 20.4 miles (32.8 km) south of Cromer.

== Description ==
The hotel has 67 rooms over four floors. All the rooms have a private bath or a shower and WC, some of the rooms have views over the sea or across the town. On the ground floor there is a reception area with a residents' lounge. There is a bar and a restaurant. Within the restaurant there is a small dance floor. During the summer there is entertainment on most evenings. All floors are serviced by a lift.

== History ==
In 1799 the population of the town was about 670. There were only four hostelries in the area. These were the King's Head, the New Inn, the Red Lion and a hotel run by a Mrs Sanderson. A publication of 1800 observed "The want of a large and well conducted inn is to be regretted by those who pay a visit to Cromer". The Hotel de Paris was built on this site in 1830. Previous to that date there was a large house on the site which had been owned by Lord Suffield and had been built in 1820. In May 1830 the house and land were put up for sale.

=== Pierre le Françoise ===
The house and property were purchased by Pierre le Françoise who used the site to build the first hotel. Pierre le Françoise had been brought to England as a child by his father, Baron del Barr, and mother. The family, who were considered aristocrats, were escaping from the French Revolution of 1799. Le Françoise established his hotel to attract the visitors who were coming to Cromer in ever increasing numbers. The hotel was listed in the directory of 1836 as a "boarding house" but by 1845 the venture was listed as the "Hotel de Paris" which is a sign that the establishment had grown and prospered by this date. Pierre le Françoise had died in 1841 and is buried in the churchyard of Cromer parish church. His widow had continued to run the hotel with the help of a manageress called Mrs Garthon. In 1845 the hotel was sold to Henry Jarvis who was a businessman in the town. Under his ownership, and later that of his son Alex, the hotel's reputation grew and prospered. It is recorded that by 1860 that an extra third floor accommodation had been added to the hotel, and possibly some fourth floor rooms.

=== New construction ===
In 1877 the Great Eastern Railway arrived in the town with the Midland and Great Northern railway reaching Cromer in 1887. These two links to the town increased the popularity and accessibility of the resort. The Hotel de Paris was showing its age. An entry in the hotel's visitors' book highlights this. It comments that although the food was excellent... "the bell ropes considered as ornament are not altogether satisfactory and as articles of utility are most inefficient". The remarks go on to say.... "The doors moreover are remarkably averse to remaining closed". The hotel was also threatened by the completion of several new hotel built in the town during this period such as the Grand Hotel, (1891 now demolished) Cliftonville Hotel on Runton Road and the Marlborough Hotel (1885 now demolished) on Prince of Wales Road. In 1891 Alex Jarvis decided to have a new hotel built on the site, and employed architect George John Skipper to design it. Skipper had an excellent reputation having designed Cromer Town Hall, the Grand Hotel and the Hotel Metropole (1893 now demolished) in Tucker Street. The design for the new hotel incorporated the old building plus the neighbouring properties of Albert House and the Belle Vue Hotel. The building contractor was J. Smith of Norwich. The finished building was considered to be the firm of J. Smith's most successful contracts. Smith would later become the president of the Norwich Master Builders. The new hotel had both a front main entrance and a rear entrance. On the ground floor there were various private and public rooms, a new reception, restaurant and bar. All the rooms were fully modernised.

=== Recent times ===
The hotel remained in the ownership of the Jarvis family but they employed management to run the hotel. The last managing director employed by the Jarvis family was Mr F. Samuels who managed the hotel until 1961 when the family decided to sell the hotel. The new owner was a Mr Bush of Norwich, who also owned his own building company. He undertook to fully modernise and renovate the hotel. Bush died in 1972 and the hotel was sold on to a London-based property company. Since this time the hotel has passed through various ownerships. Today it is part of Alfa Travel's Leisureplex Group.

The hotel has been listed Grade II on the National Heritage List for England since January 1977.

== Gallery ==
Hotel de Paris

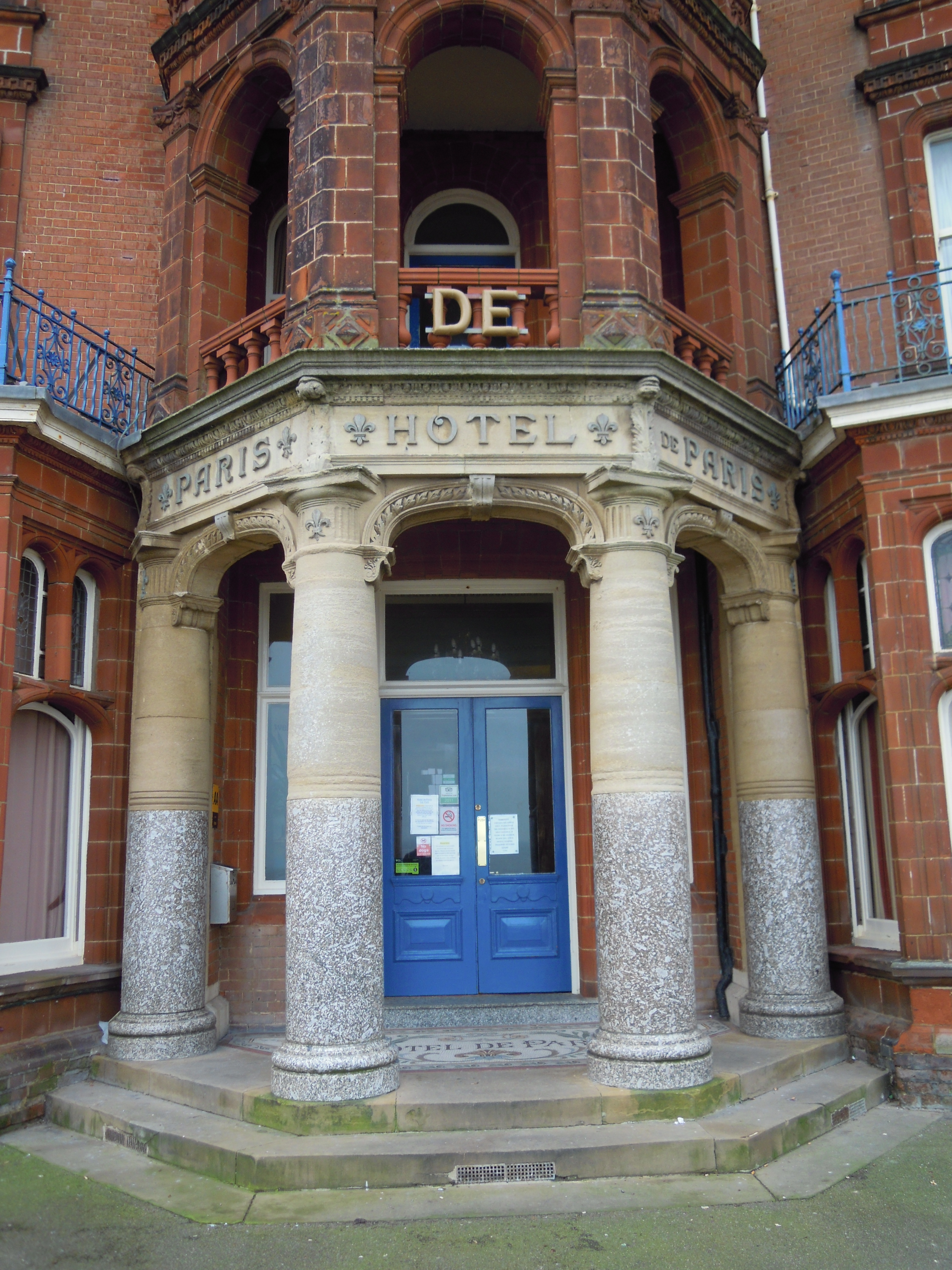
Main entrance

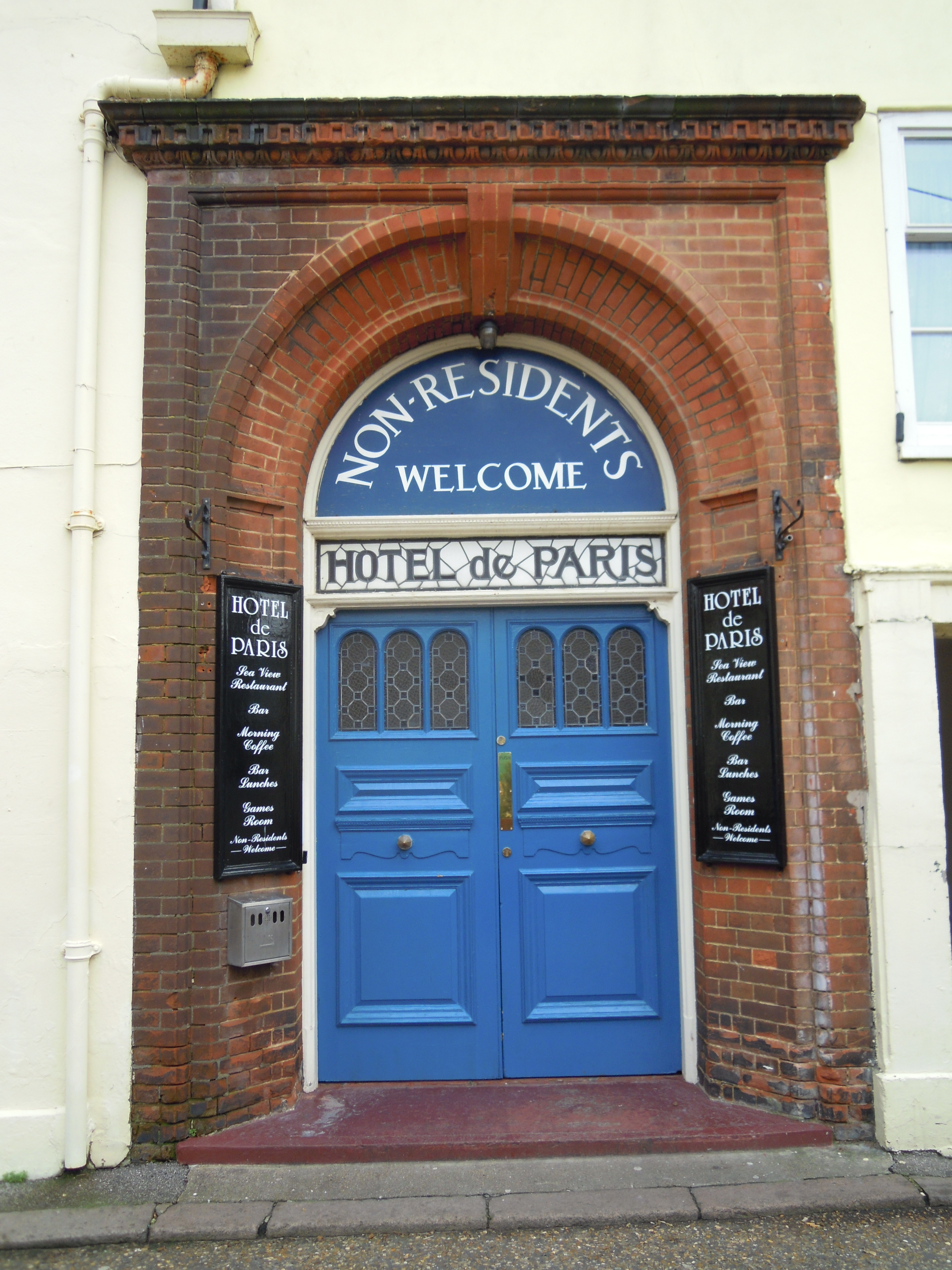
Rear entrance

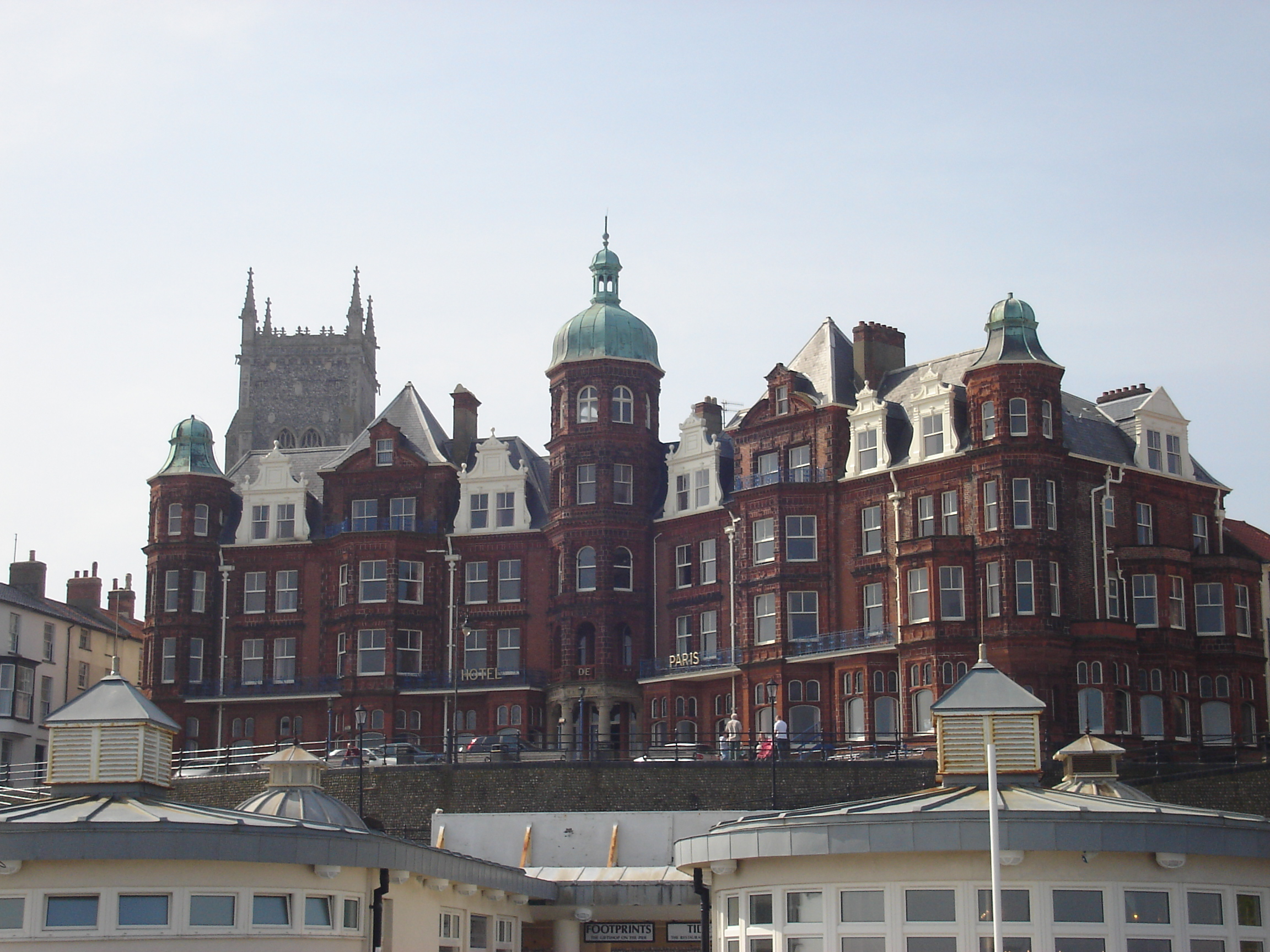
Hotel viewed from Cromer Pier
