= Pavilion Theatre, Cromer Pier =

Coordinates: 52.9339°N 1.3015°E

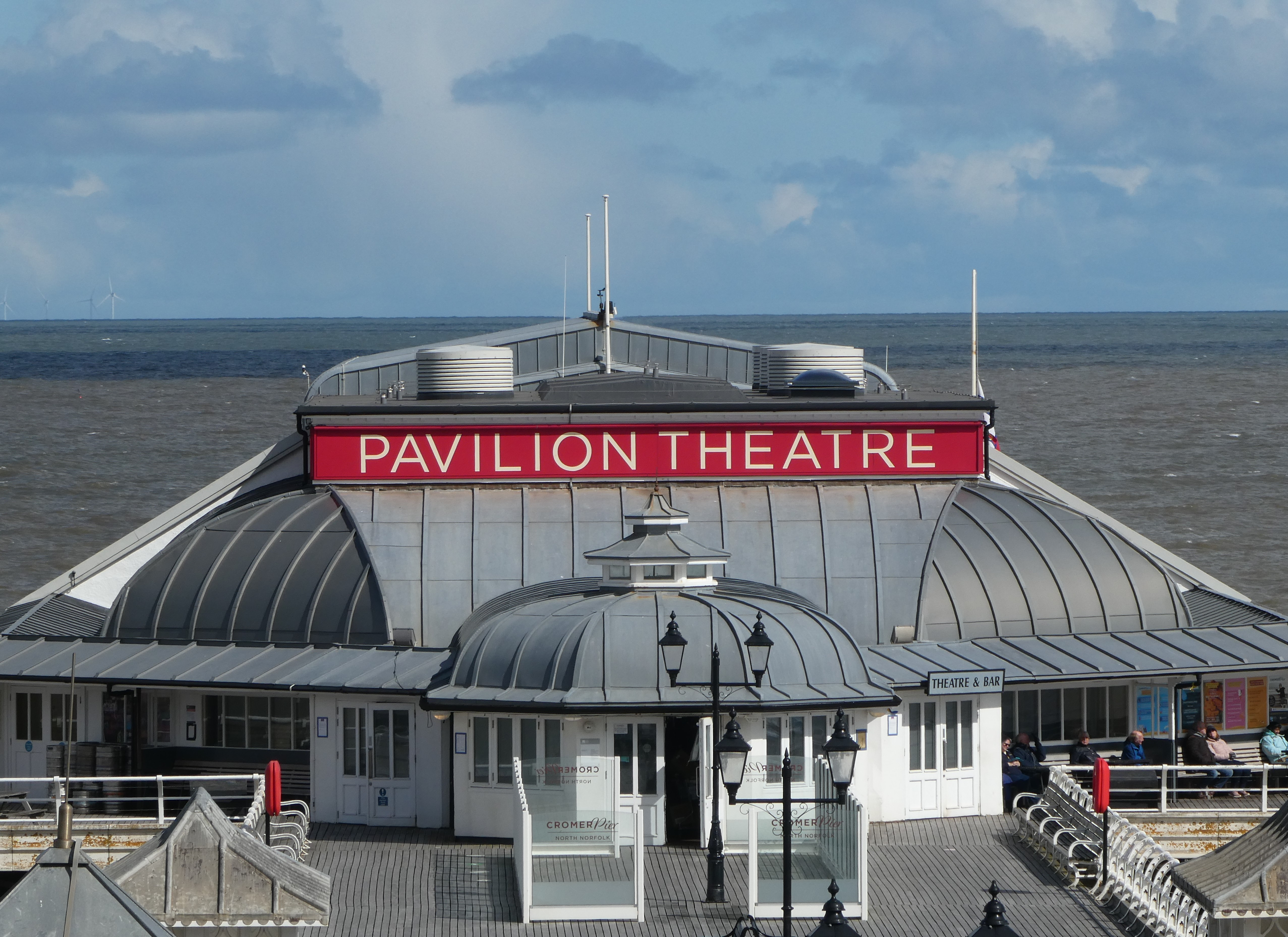
Pavilion Theatre

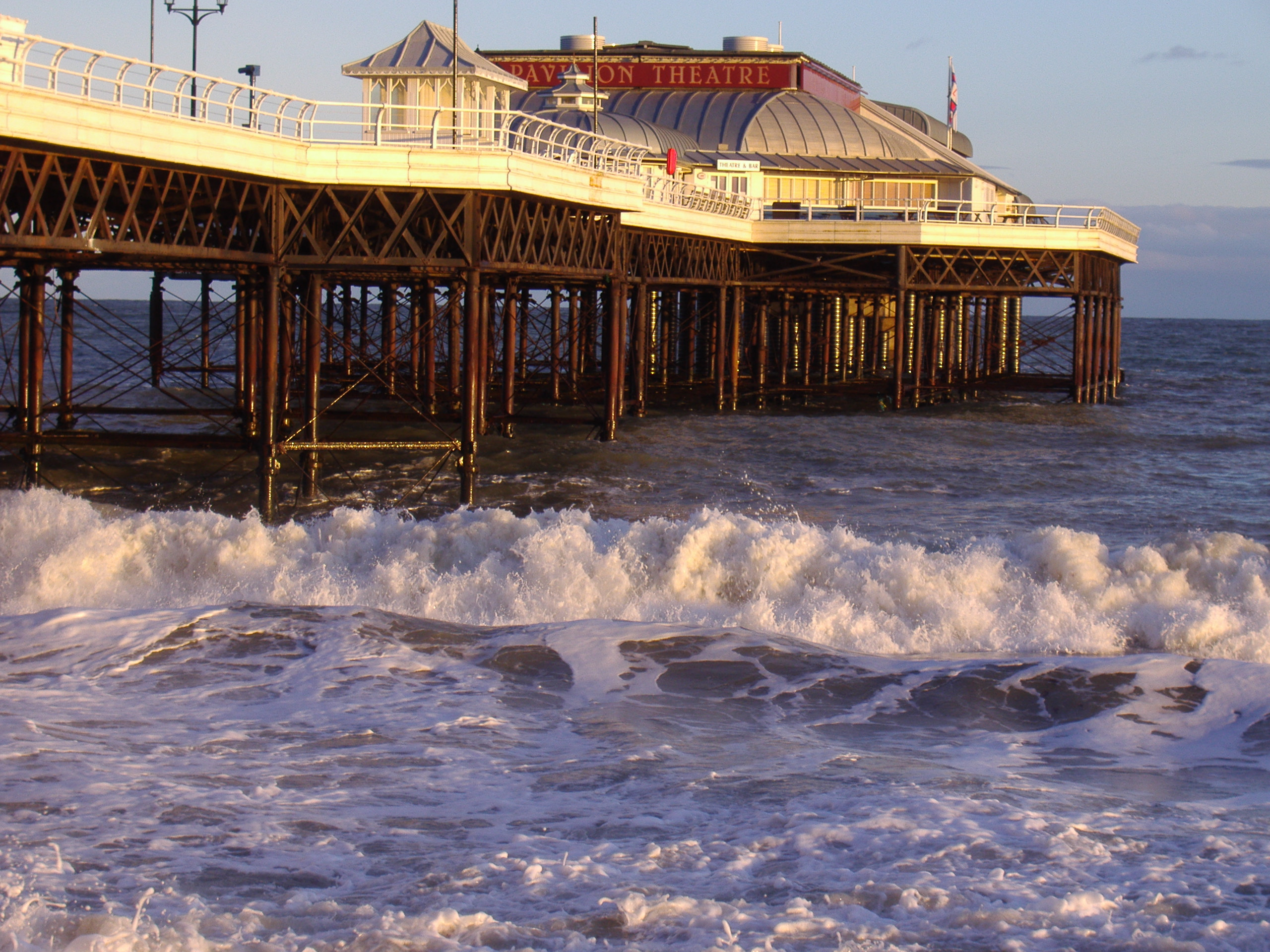
Pavilion Theatre, Cromer Pier

The Pavilion Theatre is located on Cromer Pier in Cromer, Norfolk. Originally a bandstand when the pier opened, it was converted into an enclosed pavilion in 1905.

== History ==
The pier as it is known today was opened in 1901. To celebrate its official opening The Blue Viennese Band played in an open bandstand. In 1905 the bandstand was covered to form an enclosed pavilion and the following season the first ‘concert parties’ were performed. Throughout the 20s and 30s the Cromer Protection Commission toured the South Coast looking at potential shows. In 1936 one of the theatres most famous shows appeared-Ronnie Brandons Out of the Blue.

At the outbreak of World War II the Royal Engineers removed the middle section of the pier and shows ceased for the rest of the war. The devastating gales of 1953 damaged the pier and the pavilion. Compensation was granted by the Government for the repair of the pier and the theatre was ready for the start of the 1955 season.

In 1978 changes were made to the theatre and at the same time a partnership with Irish Impresario Richard Condon. From this partnership the popular Seaside Special was created which won the National Piers Society Pier of the Year Award 2000. The pier was once again severely damaged in November 1993 by a break away rig barge. In 2001 a new partnership was formed between North Norfolk District Council and Openwide International to extend the season and increase economic growth for the pier and the town. By 2004 the theatre was redeveloped to include; increasing the capacity to 510, adding a restaurant named Tides, a new shop Footprints and a new extended bar. In 2005 Christmas Seaside Special was introduced and proved popular.

Over the years many well-known artists have appeared at the Pavilion Theatre including Ken Dodd; Cannon and Ball; Joe Brown, The Searchers; Jimmy Tarbuck; Paul Daniels; The Barron Knights; Marty Wilde; Vince Hill; Max Bygraves; Val Doonican;Raymond Froggatt. Cromer pier is featured in the film Alan Partridge: Alpha Papa.
