= Cromer =

Coastal town in Norfolk, England

Coordinates: 52.931°N 1.302°E

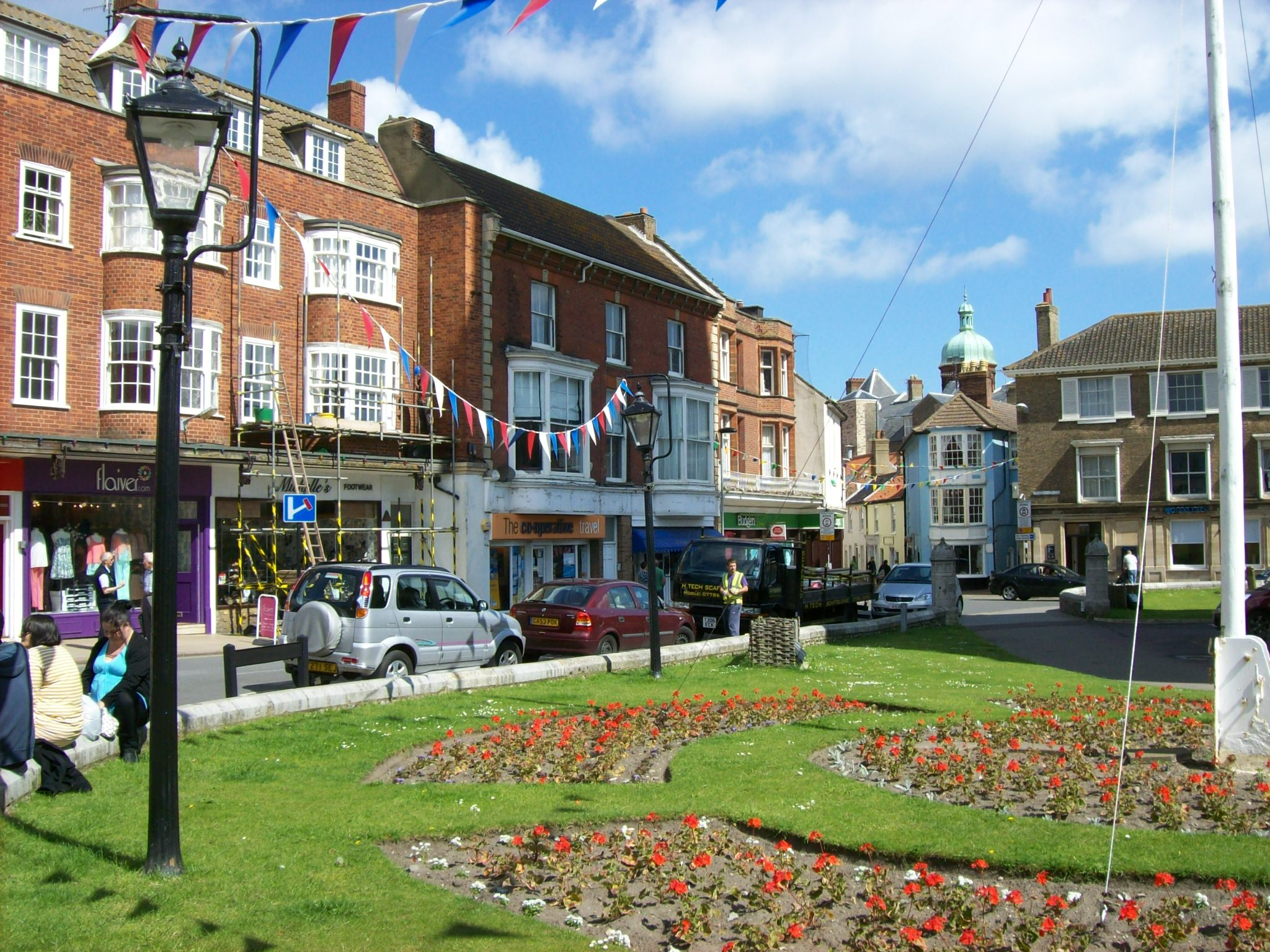
- Church Street, Cromer (2012)

- Location within Norfolk
- Area: 4.66 km^{2} (1.80 sq mi)
- Population: 7,524 (2021 census)
  - Density: 1,615/km^{2} (4,180/sq mi)
- OS grid reference: TG219422
- Civil parish: Cromer
- District: North Norfolk
- Shire county: Norfolk
- Region: East
- Country: England
- Sovereign state: United Kingdom
- Post town: CROMER
- Postcode district: NR27
- Dialling code: 01263
- Police: Norfolk
- Fire: Norfolk
- Ambulance: East of England
- UK Parliament: North Norfolk

Cromer (/ˈkroʊmər/ KROH-mər) is a coastal town and civil parish on the north coast of the North Norfolk district of the county of Norfolk, England. It is 23 miles (37 kilometres) north of Norwich, 9 miles (14 km) northwest of North Walsham and 4 miles (6 kilometres) east of Sheringham on the North Sea coastline. The local government authorities are North Norfolk District Council, whose headquarters is on Holt Road in the town, and Norfolk County Council, based in Norwich. The civil parish has an area of 4.66 km^{2} (1.80 sq mi) and at the 2011 census had a population of 7,524.

The town is notable as a traditional tourist resort and for the Cromer crab, which forms the major source of income for local fishermen. The motto Gem of the Norfolk Coast is highlighted on the town's road signs.

== History ==
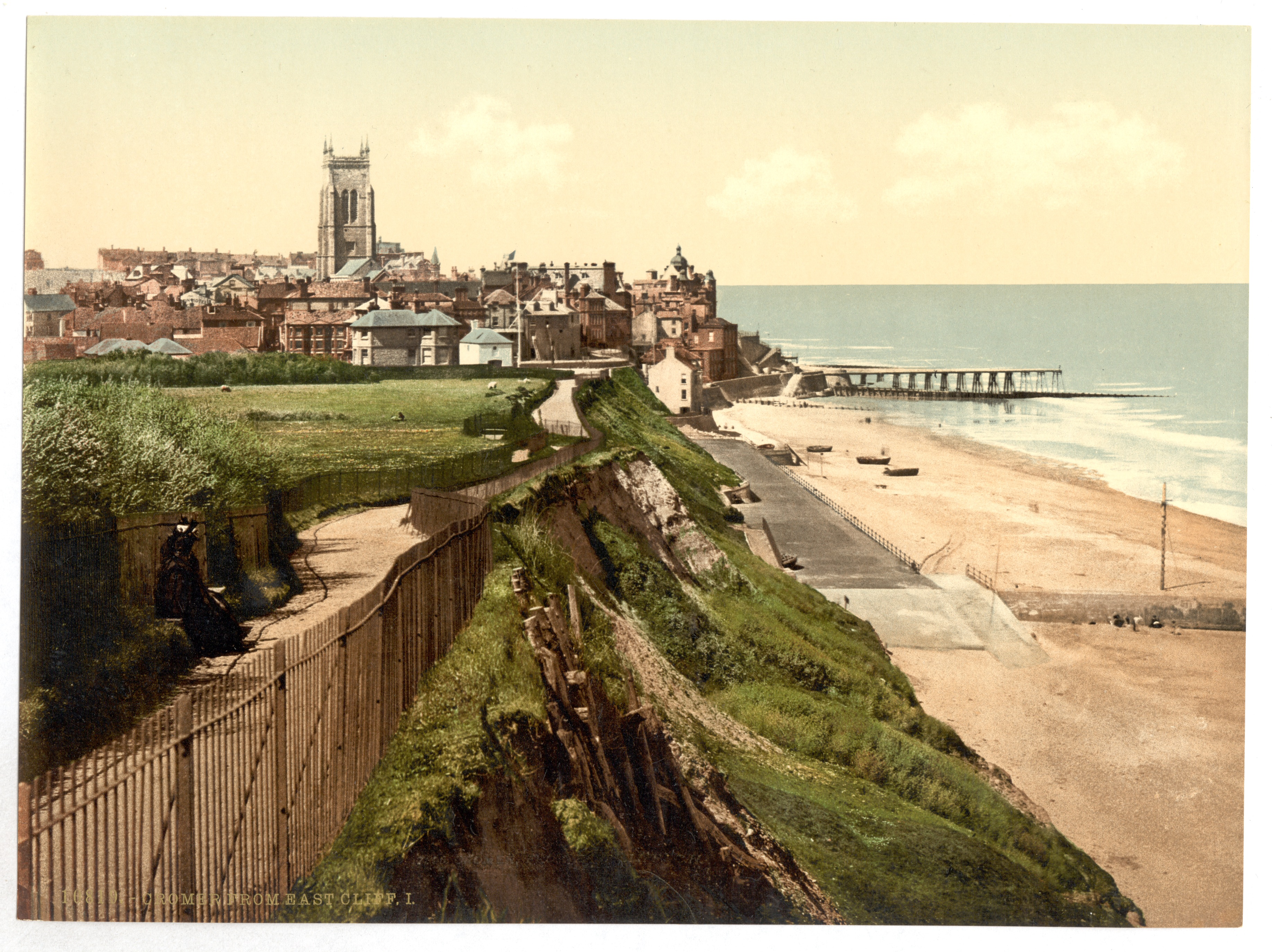
A late 19th-century postcard of the view from the East Cliff

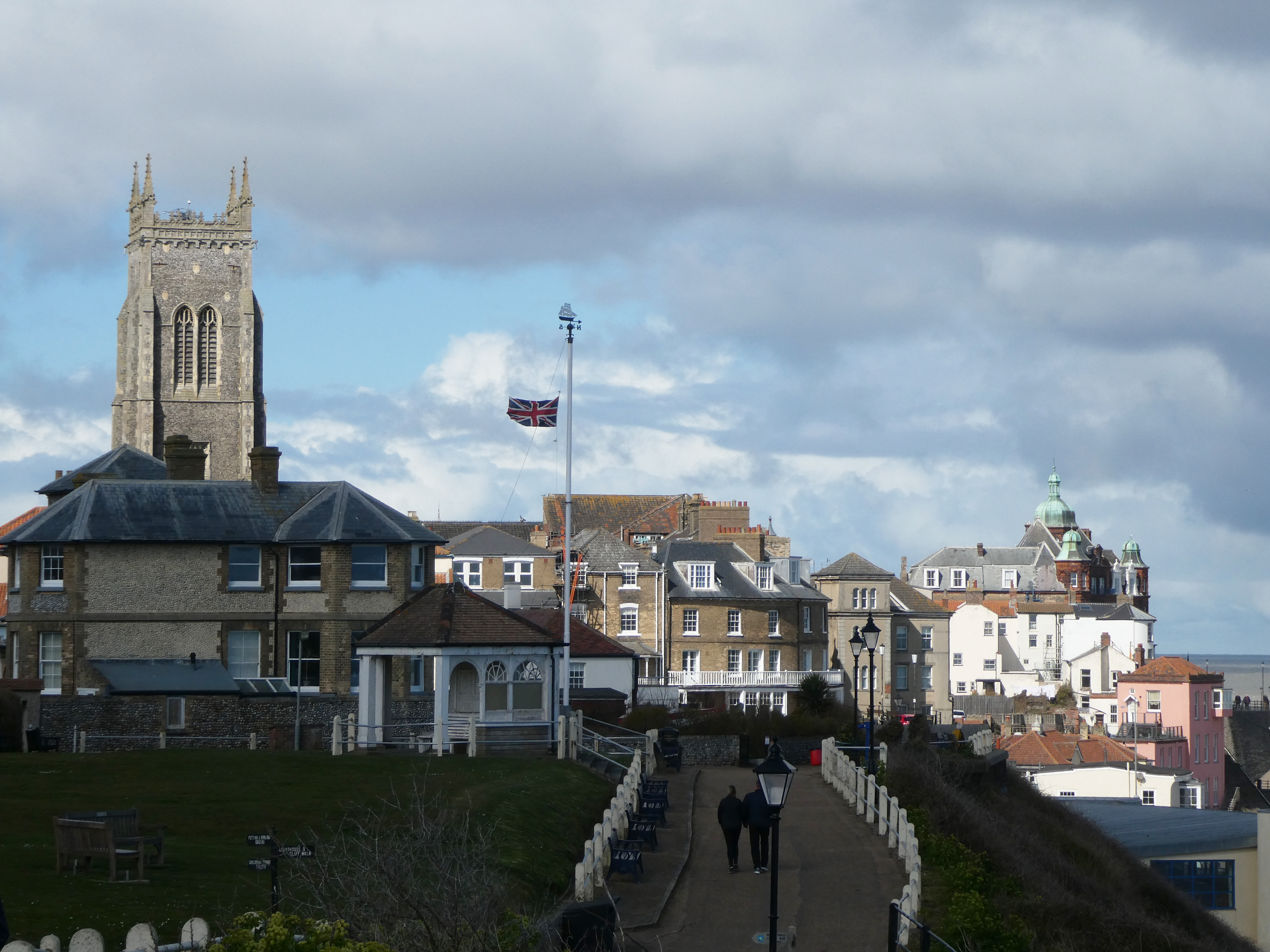
East Cliff, Cromer (2021)

The town has given its name to the Cromerian Stage or Cromerian Complex, also called the Cromerian, a stage in the Pleistocene glacial history of north-western Europe.

Cromer is not mentioned in the Domesday Book of 1086. The place-name 'Cromer' is first found in a will of 1262 and could mean 'Crows' mere or lake'. There are other contenders for the derivation, a north-country word 'cromer' meaning 'a gap in the cliffs' or less likely a direct transfer from a Danish placename.

It is reasonable to assume that the present site of Cromer, around the parish church of Saints Peter and Paul, is what was in 1337 called Shipden-juxta-Felbrigg, and by the end of the 14th century known as Cromer. A reference to a place called Crowemere Shipden can be seen in a legal record, dated 1422, (1 Henry VI) the home of John Gees. The other Shipden is now about a quarter of a mile to the north east of the end of Cromer Pier, under the sea. Its site is marked by Church Rock, now no longer visible, even at a low spring tide. In 1888 a small pleasure steamer called Victoria struck the remains of the church tower, and the rock was subsequently blown up for safety. In the present day, members of Great Yarmouth sub-aqua club dived at the site, and salvaged artefacts from both the medieval church and the wreck of Victoria.

Cromer became a resort in the early 19th century, with some of the rich Norwich banking families making it their summer home. Visitors included the future King Edward VII, who played golf here. The resort's facilities included the late-Victorian Cromer Pier, which is home to the Pavilion Theatre. In 1883 the London journalist Clement Scott went to Cromer and began to write about the area. He named the stretch of coastline, particularly the Overstrand and Sidestrand area, "Poppyland", and the combination of the railway and his writing in the national press brought many visitors. The name "Poppyland" referred to the numerous poppies which grew (and still grow) at the roadside and in meadows.

Cromer suffered several bombing raids during the Second World War. Shortly after one raid, Cromer featured as the location for an episode of An American In England, written by Norman Corwin with the narrator staying in the Red Lion Hotel and retelling several local accounts of life in the town at wartime. The radio play first aired in the United States on 1 December 1942 on the CBS/Columbia Workshop programme starring Joe Julian. The account mentions some of the effects of the war on local people and businesses and the fact that the town adopted a Bangor-class minesweeper, HMS Cromer.

On 5 December 2013 the town was affected by a storm surge which caused significant damage to the town's pier and seafront.

In 2016, the Cromer shoal chalk beds, thought to be Europe's largest chalk reef, were officially designated as a Marine Conservation Zone.

== Economy ==
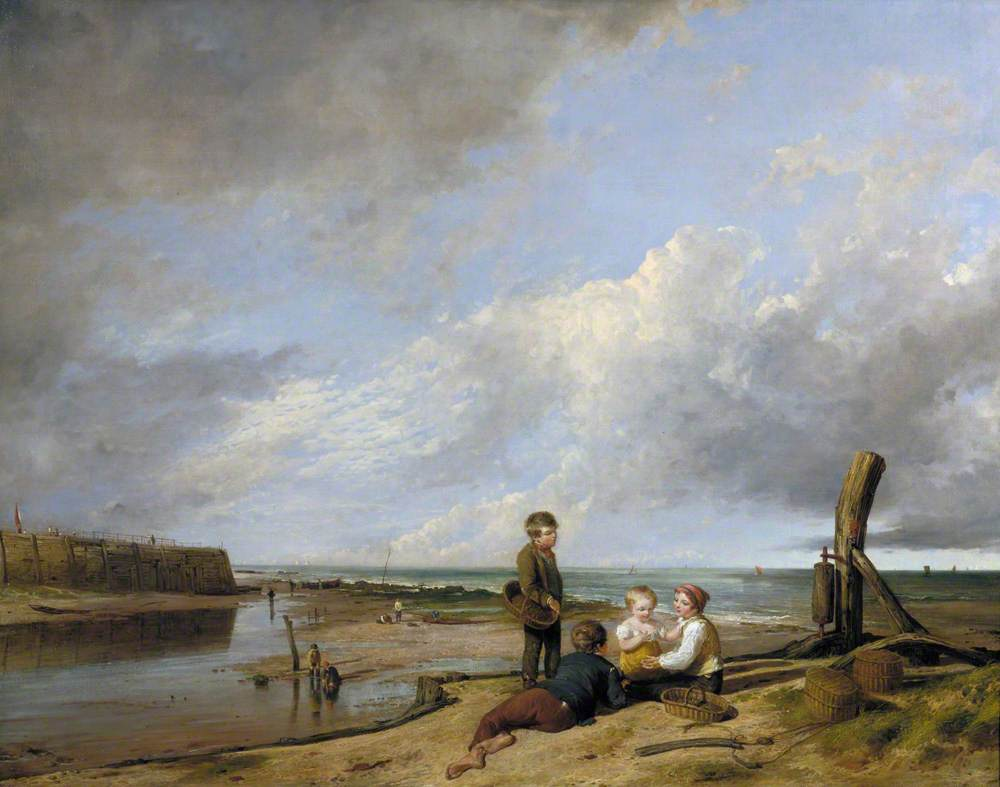
Shrimp Boys at Cromer by William Collins, 1815

Historically, Cromer was a fishing town. It grew as a fishing station over the centuries, and was a year-round fishery into the 20th century, with crabs and lobsters in the summer, drifting for longshore herring in the autumn and long-lining, primarily for cod, in the winter.

Fishermen at East Beach, Cromer, c. 1902

The pattern of fishing has changed since the 1980s, and it is now almost completely focused on crabs and lobsters. The town is famous for the Cromer crab, which is now the major source of income for the local fishermen. In 2016, about ten boats plied their trade from the foot of the gangway on the east beach, with shops in the town selling fresh crab, whenever the boats come home from the sea. By 2018, experienced crabmen were having difficulty attracting young people to the business, perhaps because of the long working hours required during the season. Lobster trapping was also continuing.

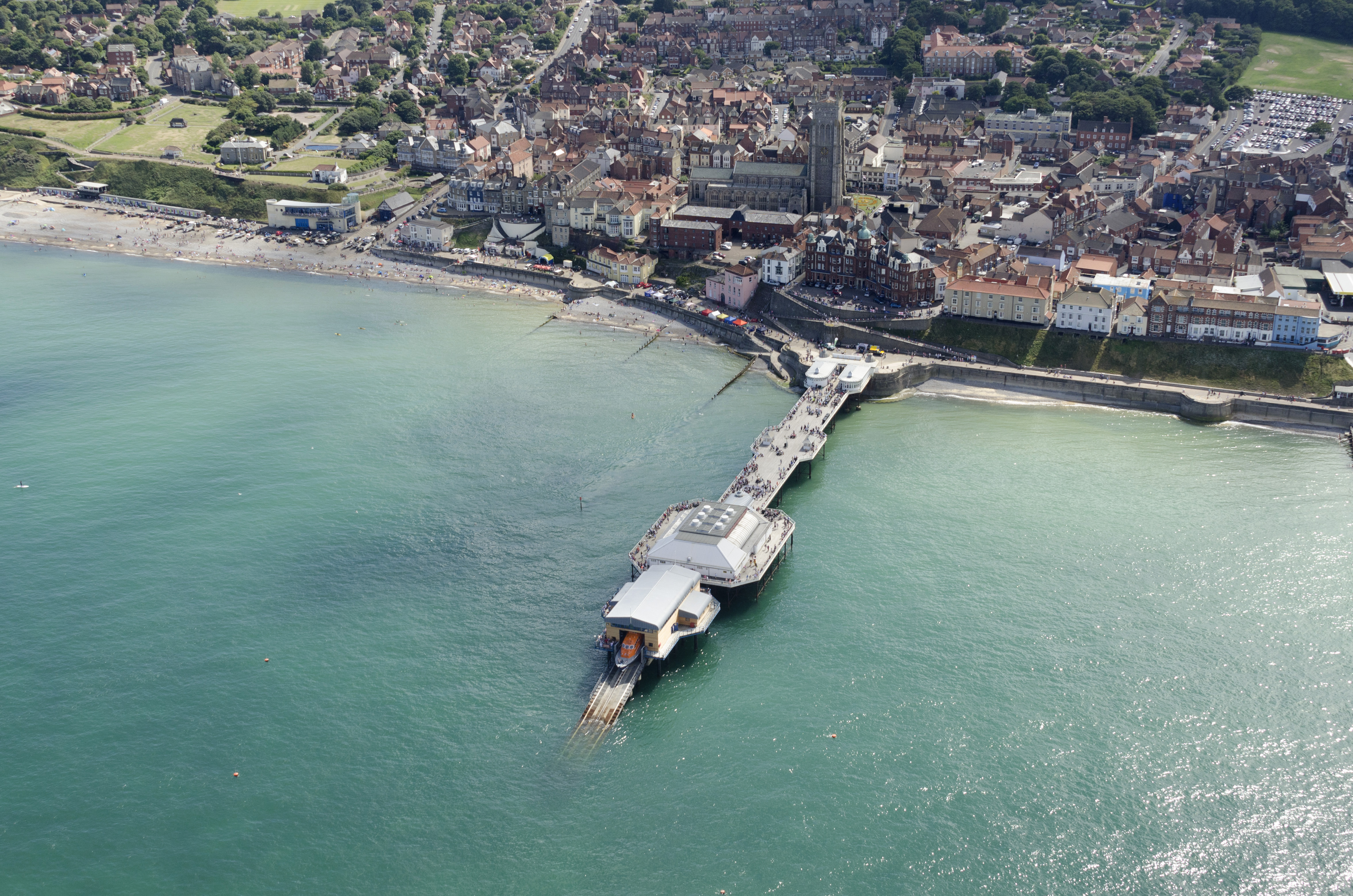
Aerial view of Cromer Pier (2015)

Tourism developed in the town during the Victorian period and is now an important part of the local economy. The town is a popular resort and a touring base for the surrounding area. The coastal location means that beach holidays and fishing are important. Visitor attractions include Cromer Pier and the Pavilion Theatre on the pier. Close to the pier the RNLI Henry Blogg Museum is housed inside the early 21st century Rocket House. The museum has the Cromer Lifeboat H F Bailey III (ON 777) as its centrepiece and illustrates the history of the town's lifeboats and lifeboatman Henry Blogg's most famous rescues.

The South American themed Amazona zoo park opened to the public in 2006 and is to the south of the town. The park covers ten acres (four hectares) of former brick kilns and woodland on the outskirts of the town and has animals including jaguar and puma.

== Culture and community ==
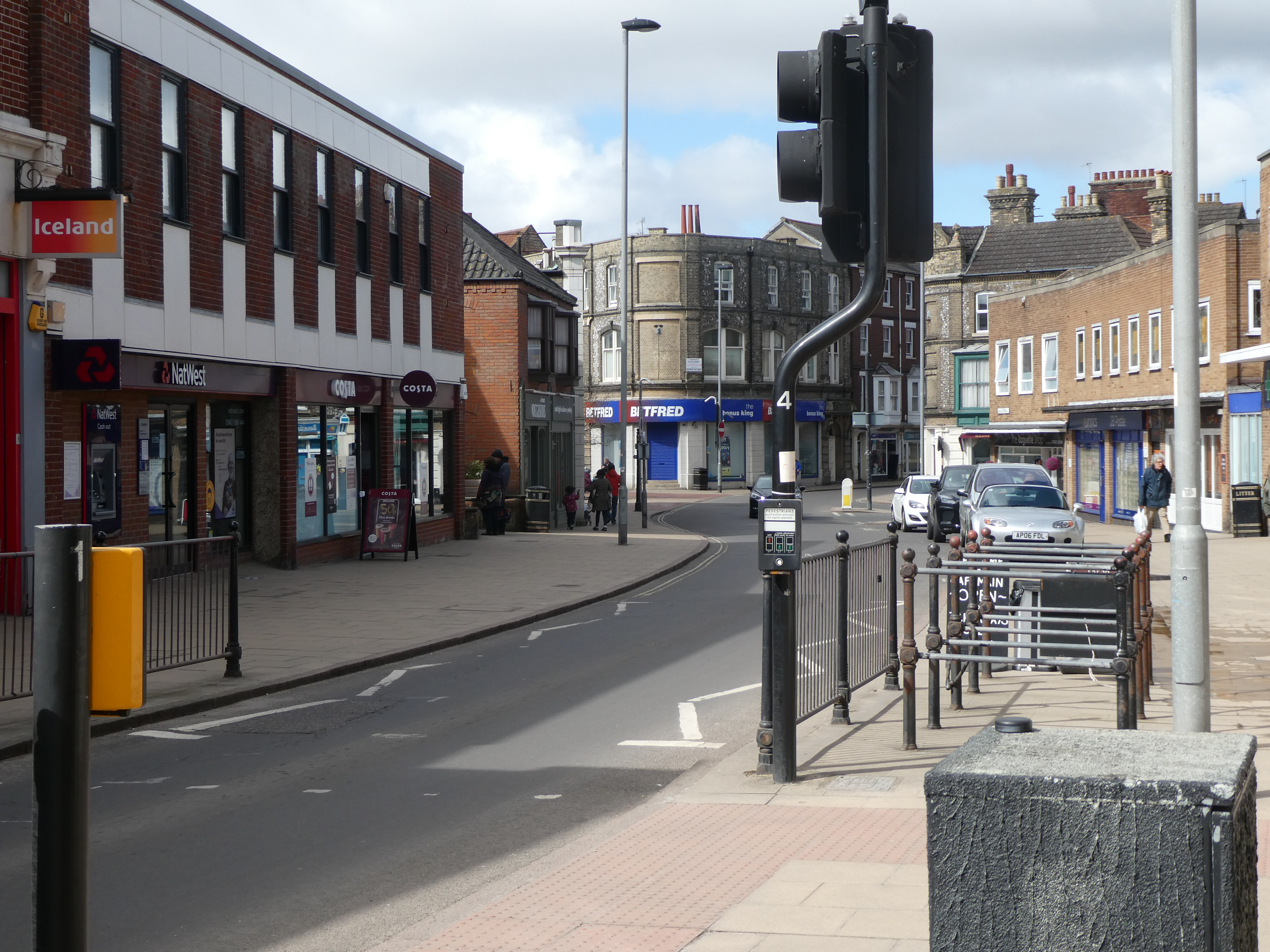
Church Street (2021)

For one week in August the town celebrates its Carnival Week. Attractions include the crowning of a 'royal family' including carnival queen, a street parade and a fancy dress competition. The event's 50th anniversary was held in 2019.

Cromer is twinned with Nidda, Germany and Crest, France. The town has an Air Training Corps Squadron and an Army Cadet Force Platoon, based at Cromer High School.

The town has a Friday market and a number of independent retailers in its centre. Cromer Hospital provides services across the North Norfolk area. It includes a minor injuries unit and is run by the Norfolk and Norwich University Hospitals NHS Foundation Trust.

Cromer Museum opened in 1978 and is housed in former fishermen's cottages adjacent to the parish church on Church Street. The museum managed by Norfolk County Council contain items relating to the history of Cromer, including paintings and Poppyland china. It has two permanent galleries on the pioneering photographer, Olive Edis - Britain's first female war photographer. A mock-up of a Victorian cottage and galleries containing geology and fossil remnants of the area which include part of the West Runton Mammoth.

== Landmarks ==
Cromer stands between stretches of coastal cliffs which, to the east, are up to 70 metres (230 ft) high. According to palaeontologist Dr James Neenan, from the Oxford University Museum of Natural History, the cliffs are part of a Norfolk coastline area rich in Pleistocene fossils. In 2017 a prehistoric rhino was found in West Runton, dating back 700,000 years to the Cromerian Interglacial.

Cromer Pier dominates the sea front and is 151 metres (495 ft) long. It features the Pavilion Theatre and dates from 1901. Cromer Lighthouse stands on the cliffs to the east of the town. The tower is 18 metres (59 ft) tall. and stands 81 metres (266 ft) above sea level. The light has a range of 21 nautical miles (39 kilometres).

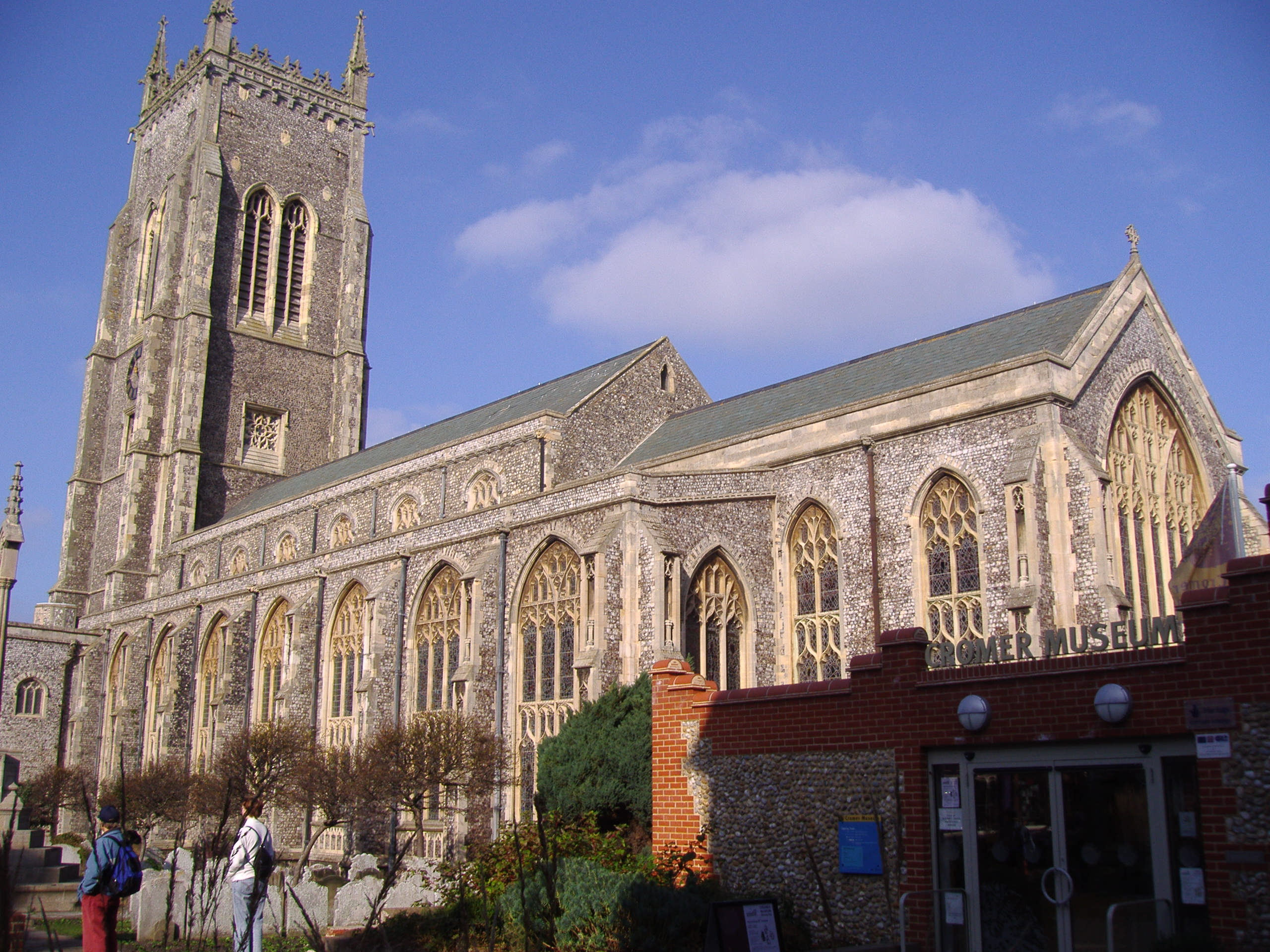
Church of St. Peter and St. Paul, Cromer (2007)

The Church of St Peter and St Paul dates from the 14th century and is in the centre of the town. After falling into disrepair it was rebuilt in the late 19th century by architect Arthur Blomfield. At 158 ft (48 m) the bell tower is the highest in the county. Also of note are the large stained glass windows which commemorate various members of the lifeboat crew and other features of the resort.

The Hotel de Paris was originally built in 1820 as a coastal residence for Lord Suffield. In 1830 the building was converted into a hotel by Pierre le Francois. Norfolk-born architect George Skipper extensively remodelled the building between 1895 and 1896. The hotel occupies an elevated location overlooking the pier, and still provides visitor accommodation. Other notable hotels include the 17th century Red Lion Hotel, the Victorian Sandcliff Hotel and the Edwardian Cliftonville Hotel.

Cromer Hall is located to the south of the town in Hall Road. The original hall was destroyed by fire and was rebuilt in 1829 in a Gothic Revival style, by Norfolk architect William John Donthorne. Henry Baring, of the Baring banking family, acquired the estate around this time. Evelyn Baring, 1st Earl of Cromer was born at the hall in 1841. In 2010 the building was the home of the Cabbell Manners family. In 1901, author Arthur Conan Doyle was a guest at the hall. After hearing the legend of the Black Shuck, a ghostly black dog, he is thought to have been inspired to write the classic novel The Hound of the Baskervilles.

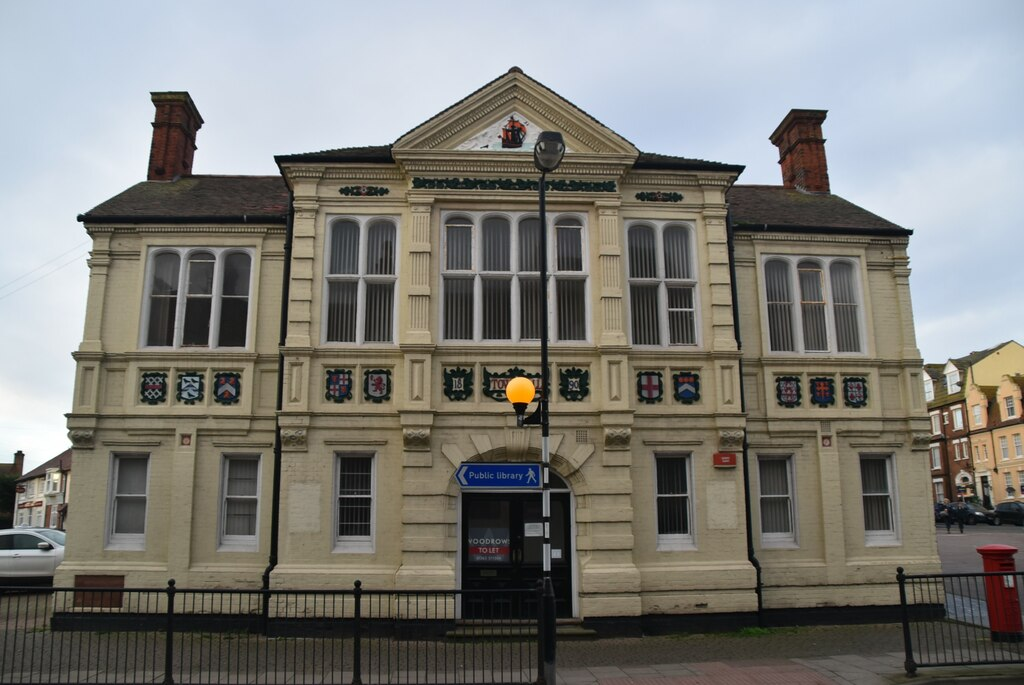
The Old Town Hall (2019)

The Old Town Hall, which was once the main public events venue in the town, was completed in 1890.

=== Lifeboat station ===
The fishermen also crewed Cromer's two lifeboats. Most famous of the lifeboatmen was Henry Blogg, who received the RNLI gold medal for heroism three times, and the silver medal four times. Cromer Lifeboat Station was founded in 1804, the first in Norfolk. Rowing lifeboats were stationed there through the 19th century.

In the 1920s a lifeboat station was built at the end of the pier, enabling a motor lifeboat to be launched beyond the breakers. A number of notable rescues carried out between 1917 and 1941 made the lifeboat and the town well known throughout the United Kingdom and further afield. The area covered by the station is large, as there is a long run of coastline with no harbour – Great Yarmouth is 40 miles (65 km) by sea to the south east and the restricted harbour of Wells next the Sea 25 miles (40 km) to the west. Today the offshore lifeboat on the pier performs about a dozen rescues a year, with about the same number for the inshore lifeboat stationed on the beach.

The Duke of Kent officially named the town's new lifeboat, Lester, in a ceremony on 8 September 2008.

== Transport ==
Cromer railway station is a stop on the Bittern Line, which provides generally hourly services between Norwich and Sheringham. Services are operated by Greater Anglia.

The railway came to Cromer in 1877, with the opening of Cromer High station by the Great Eastern Railway. Ten years later, a second station, Cromer Beach, was opened by the Midland and Great Northern Joint Railway, bringing visitors in from the East Midlands; only this station remains today and it was renamed Cromer in 1969, following the closure of Cromer High station. Direct services were operated from London, Manchester, Leicester, Birmingham, Leeds, Peterborough and Sheffield. The now-closed Cromer tunnel linked Beach station with the Mundesley line to the east; it was the only railway tunnel to be built in Norfolk.

Bus services are provided by Sanders Coaches, which link the town with local destinations including Norwich, Sheringham, Holt, Wells-next-the-sea and North Walsham.

The A140 links Cromer with Norwich, the A148 (direct) and A149 (coast road) to King's Lynn, and the A149 to the Norfolk Broads and Great Yarmouth. The B1159 is a coastal road out towards Mundesley.

The nearest airport is Norwich International Airport. A private airfield, Northrepps Aerodrome, is located three miles (five kilometres) south-east of the town.

== Education ==
Cromer Academy is the town's only secondary school. It educates children aged 11 to 16. For sixth-form education, children travel to Sheringham, Paston College in North Walsham, or Norwich. The town also has a junior school educating children from 5 to 11 years of age, an infants school (Suffield Park infants) and an attached nursery.

== Media ==
Local news and television programmes are provided by BBC East and ITV Anglia. Television signals are received from either one of the two local relay transmitters (Overstrand and West Runton).

Local radio stations are BBC Radio Norfolk on 95.6 FM, Heart East on 102.4 FM, Greatest Hits Radio East (formerly North Norfolk Radio) on 103.2 FM, and Poppyland Community Radio, a community online based station which broadcast from the town.

The town is served by the local newspapers, North Norfolk News and Eastern Daily Press.

== Sport and leisure ==
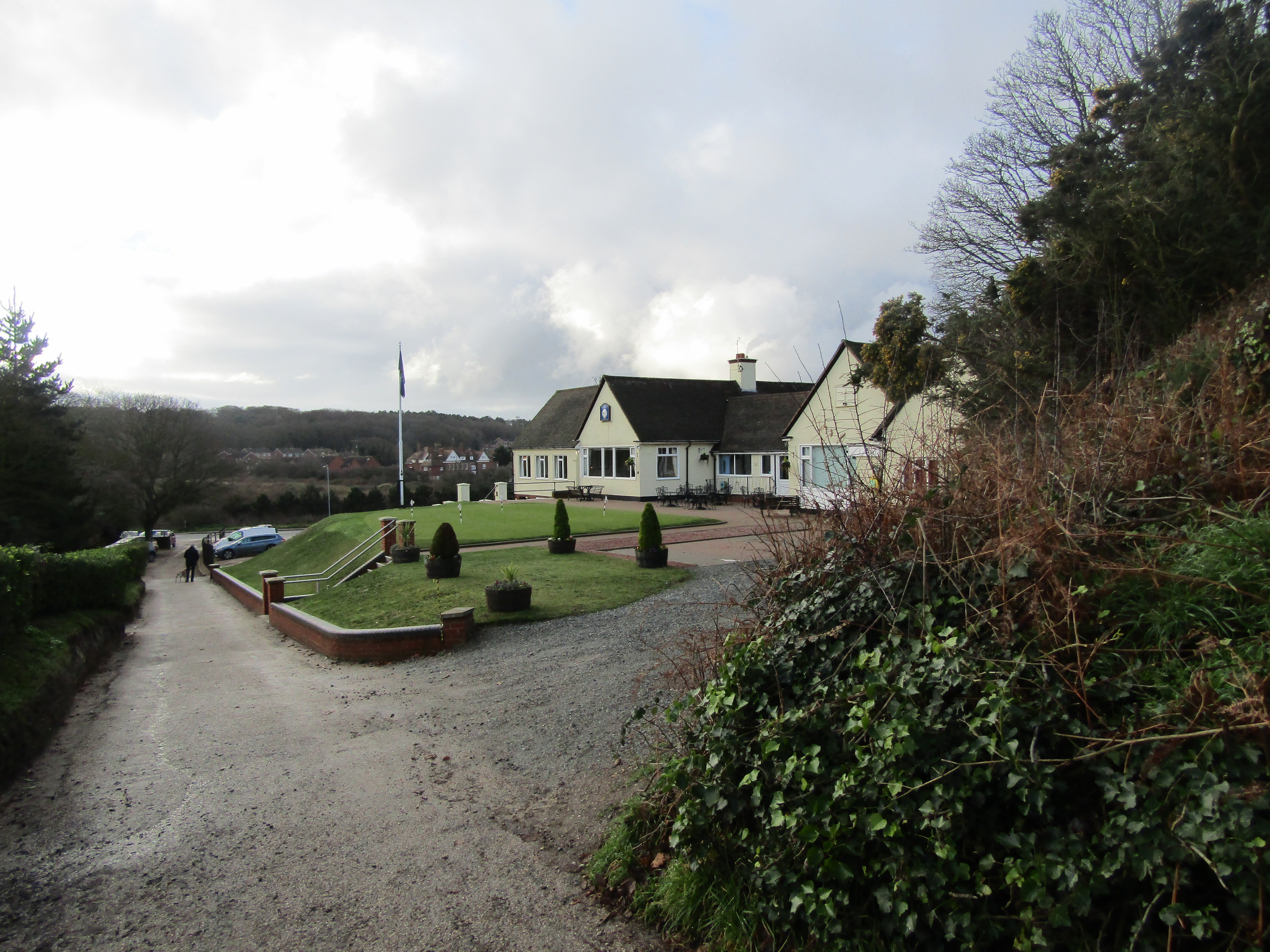
Royal Cromer Golf Club (2018)

Cromer has sports clubs and leisure facilities. Situated on the cliffs between the town and Overstrand to the east, the Royal Cromer Golf Club was founded in 1888 and given royal status by the Prince of Wales, one of the founding members, in the same year. The course was originally designed by Old Tom Morris and hosted the British Ladies Amateur Golf Championship in 1905, before which an unofficial match was held between British and American ladies, the first international golf match to be played. The club, which is the second oldest in Norfolk, has hosted PGA events.

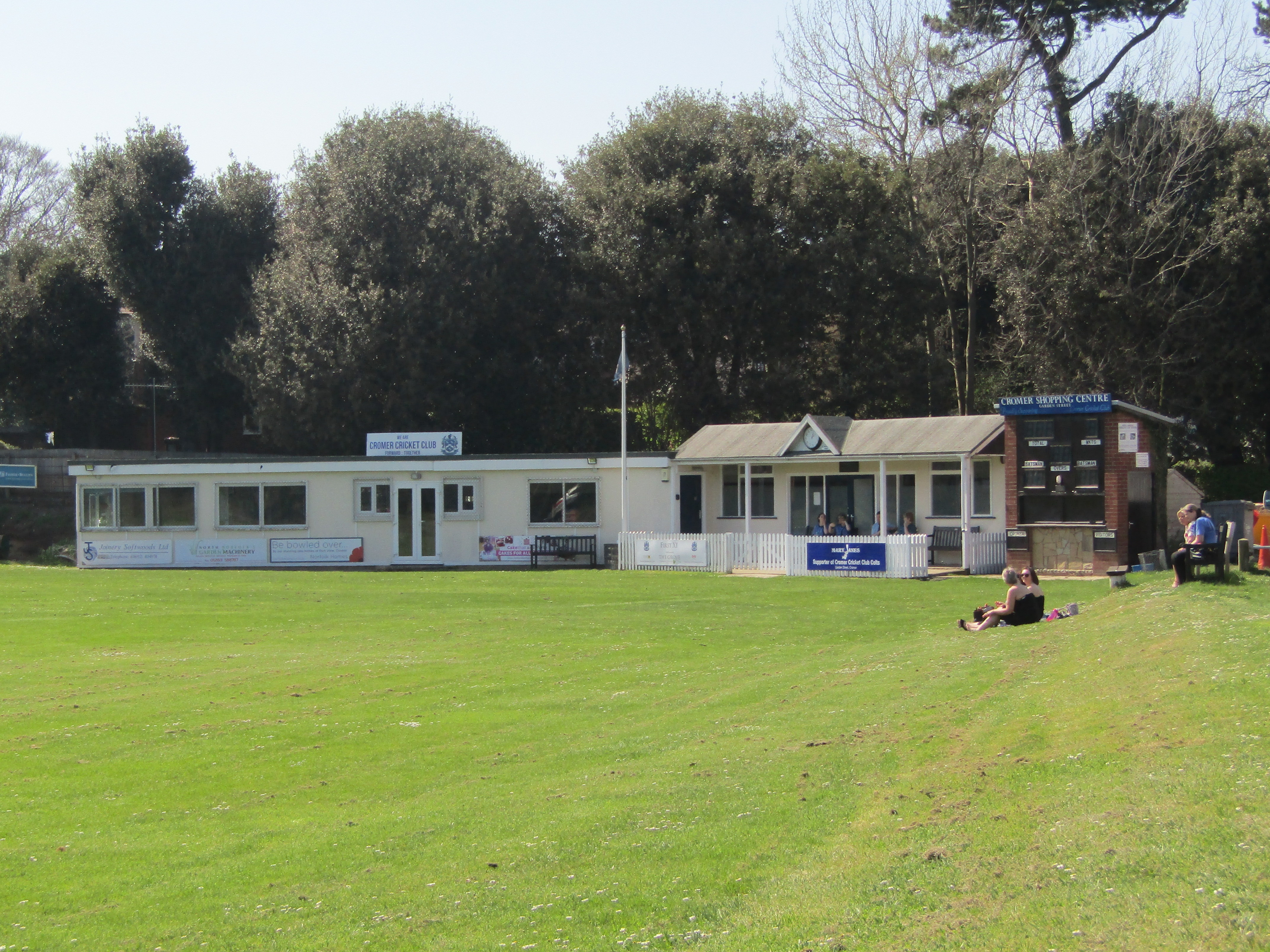
Cromer Cricket Club (2018)

Cromer Cricket Club is an English amateur cricket club that is based on The Norton Warnes Cricket Ground on Overstrand Road. Cromer CC have 2 Saturday senior XI teams that compete in the Norfolk Cricket Alliance League, a Women's softball team in the NCB Women’s Softball Cricket League, and a junior section that play competitive cricket in the Junior Tier Groups of the Norfolk Cricket Alliance League.

Cabbell Park has been the home of Cromer Town F.C. since 1922. The long established club plays in the Premier Division of the Anglian Combination. The town's tennis and squash courts are located at Norwich Road and are open to the public.

The Norfolk Coast Path passes through the town and is also the termination of the Weavers' Way. The 92-mile (148-kilometre) Norfolk Coast Cycleway runs parallel to the coast and passes through a mixture of quiet roads and country lanes to link the town with Kings Lynn to the west and Great Yarmouth in the east.

Sea angling is popular and mixed catches including cod can be made from the town's beaches. The pier provides the opportunity to capture specimen sized bass. Established in 2007, the North Norfolk Surf Lifesaving Club (North Norfolk SLSC) has its clubhouse on the town's main promenade. Surfing is also carried out on the town's beaches close to the pier. Equipment and lessons can be hired in season.

== Cultural references ==
=== Literature ===
The town is featured as a location in the novels Emma by Jane Austen and North and South by Elizabeth Gaskell.

Emma by Jane Austen Chapter XII

You should have gone to Cromer, my dear, if you went anywhere. Perry was a week at Cromer once, and he holds it to be the best of all the seabathing places. A fine open sea, he says, and very pure air. And, by what I understand, you might have had lodgings there quite away from the sea quarter of a mile off, very comfortable. You should have consulted Perry.

North and South by Elizabeth Gaskell Chapter XLIX

There was no Spain for Margaret that autumn; although to the last she hoped that some fortunate occasion would call Frederick to Paris, whither she could easily have met with a convoy. Instead of Cadiz, she had to content herself with Cromer. To that place her aunt Shaw and the Lennoxes were bound. They had all along wished her to accompany them, and, consequently, with their characters, they made but lazy efforts to forward her own separate wish. Perhaps Cromer was, in one sense of the expression, the best for her. She needed bodily strengthening and bracing as well as rest.

Edward Lear includes a limerick about Cromer in his Book of Nonsense.

=== Film media ===
In a Monty Python episode first shown in 1970 (Series 2, Episode 9, Skit: Cosmetic Surgery), the name on the "desk" of Professor Sir Adrian Furrows indicates that the character has a B.Sc from, among sundry other places, Cromer.

In The Three Doctors, a 1972–1973 serial in the long-running BBC television series Doctor Who, the doctor's ally, Brigadier Lethbridge-Stewart mistakes the surface of an alien planet for the town, famously uttering, "I'm fairly sure that's Cromer". Actor Nicholas Courtney improvised the line, name-checking the place where he got his first professional job as an actor-cum-assistant stage manager.

The final scenes of the David Croft and Jimmy Perry sitcom You Rang, M'Lord? were filmed on Cromer beach, shortly after the characters of Alf Stokes (played by Paul Shane) and Ivy Teasdale (played by Su Pollard) had left their jobs as butler and maid respectively to Lord Meldrum and had returned to their earlier careers in music hall theatre. The stage and audience seating are set up on the beach and Cromer town and Pier can clearly be seen in the background of some shots.

The final scenes of the 2013 film Alan Partridge: Alpha Papa were filmed on Cromer Pier.

Filming took place in the town during November 2014 of the BBC 1 series Partners in Crime.

A BBC short fantasy – Wonderland, first aired 1 December 2018, was filmed in Cromer featuring the pier. It depicts the distant personal relationship between a busy mother's lifestyle working with IT bizarrely crossed-over to her son's video-game-driven lifestyle, causing the screens of both to display corrupted fragments of each other's content, and everyone else's real-time frame to freeze, allowing mother and son to enjoy unique quality time together. The musical theme is Emmy the Great’s Lost in You.

Several scenes in the 2018 TV series Angry Birds on the Run were filmed in Cromer.

=== Music ===
The town is referenced in the song Norman and Norma by The Divine Comedy.

"Norman and Norma got married in Cromer, April 1983"

== International relations ==
Cromer is twinned with:

- Crest, Drôme, Auvergne-Rhône-Alpes, France
- Nidda, Hesse, Germany

== Notable people ==
- Edward Bach, creator of Bach flower remedies
- Henry Blogg, most decorated lifeboatman of the RNLI.
- Benjamin Bond Cabbell, politician and philanthropist
- Henry "Shrimp" Davies, longest-serving coxswain of the lifeboat
- Emily Wilding Davison, women's rights campaigner.
- Teresa del Riego, composer of ballads, lived at 'Sycamore', Mundesley Road, Overstrand
- James Dyson, creator of Dyson vacuum cleaners
- John Henry Gurney, banker and amateur ornithologist
- John Hurt, veteran actor; had a home close to the town
- Charles William Peach, British naturalist and geologist
- Malcolm Sayer, designer for Jaguar cars
- Simon Thomas, television presenter
- Liam Walsh, the boxer is based in the town.
- Charles Mayes Wigg, artist

== Freedom of the Town ==
The following people and military units have received the Freedom of the Town of Cromer.

=== Individuals ===
- Anthony "Tony" Shipp: 15 August 2022.

== See also ==
- Cromerian Stage
- Cromer Ridge
- Cromer Shoal Chalk Beds – Natural History
- Cromer, New South Wales – the suburb in Sydney, Australia named after this north Norfolk town
