= George Skipper =

English architect

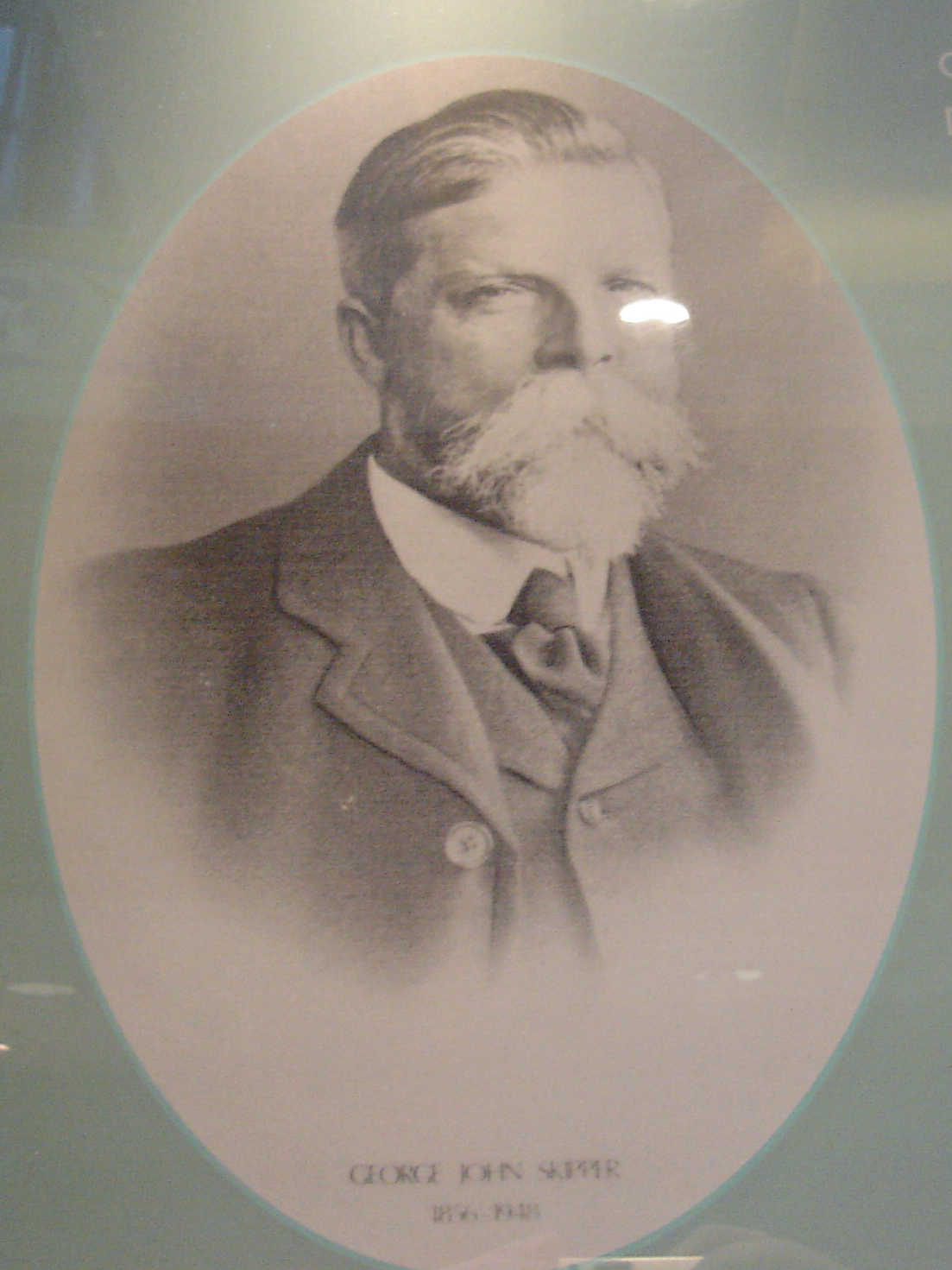
- Born: George John Skipper; 6 August 1856; Dereham, England
- Died: 1 August 1948 (aged 91)
- Occupation: Architect
- Practice: 7 London Street, Norwich
- Projects: Jarrolds departmental store Royal Arcade, Norwich; Norwich Union headquarters

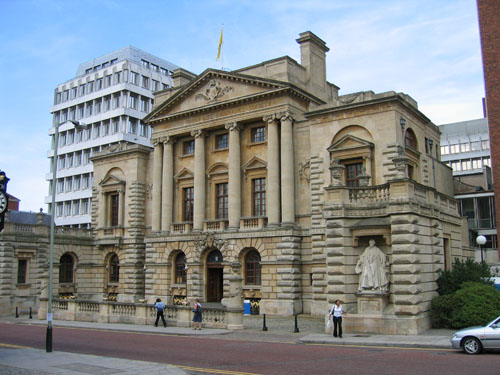
Surrey House, Surrey Street, Norwich

George John Skipper (6 August 1856 – 1 August 1948) was a leading Norwich-based architect of the late Victorian and Edwardian period. Writer and poet, John Betjeman said of him "he is altogether remarkable and original. He was to Norwich what Gaudi was to Barcelona" He is regarded as an important Modern Style (British Art Nouveau style) architect.

== Life ==
Skipper was born in the Norfolk market town of East Dereham, the son of Robert Skipper a carpenter and builder. Skipper was educated at Bracondale School, Norwich and later went on to attend the Norwich School of Art for one year. He trained as an architect in London and returned to work in his father's firm of builders in Norwich. After setting up his own business in 1879 he was commissioned to design the town hall at Cromer and, subsequently, several seaside hotels in the town.

Much of his best work, dating from around the beginning of the twentieth century, is in Norwich. At this time, Skipper, along with his rival, Edward Boardman, dominated building in the city. His own office in London Street, now part of the Jarrolds departmental store, has a red brick facade with a frieze featuring scenes of architects and builders. It is faced with a locally made type of terracotta called Cosseyware, made at Costessey (pronounced "Cossey") near Norwich by the firm of Guntons. In 1899 he designed the Arts and Crafts style Royal Arcade in the city. His design for the Norwich Union headquarters in Surrey Street was completed in 1903–4. The building features the noted Marble Hall.

== Personal life ==
His first two wives died and he married again in 1913. His son, Edward (1918–2005) (by his 3rd wife Elizabeth Alice Charter, née Roberts), himself an important local architect, worked with him while studying architecture. Skipper died in 1948 and is buried in the Earlham Road Cemetery, Norwich.

== Works ==
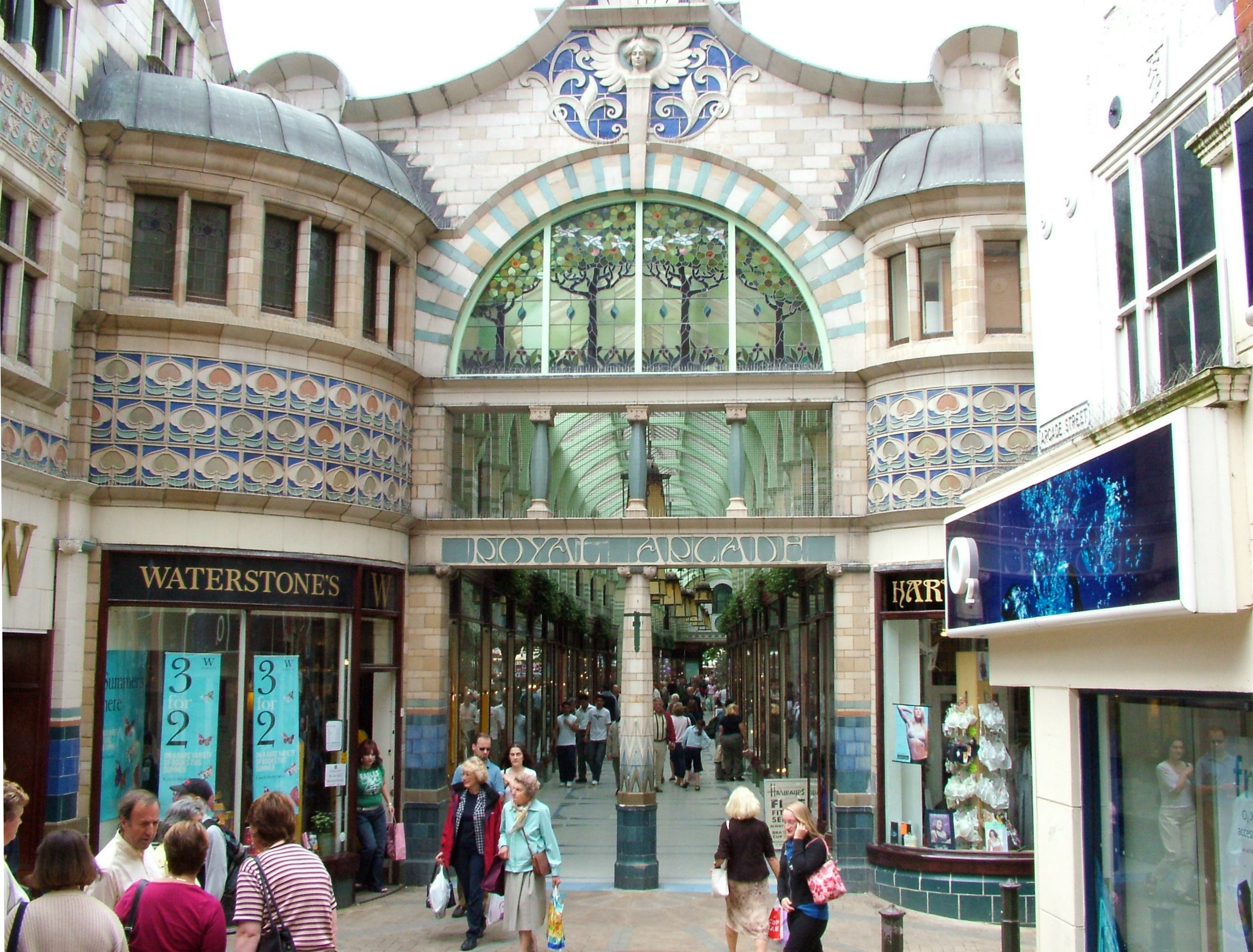
The Royal Arcade, Norwich

Norwich

- Jarrolds departmental store, Exchange Street and London Street. (1903–05).
- Skipper's office at 7, London Street now part of the above store (1896).
- Additions and extensions to 9–11 London Street (1897).
- The Royal Arcade (1898–99).
- Norfolk Daily Standard offices, St Giles' Street (1899–1900).
- Haymarket Chambers, (1901–03).
- Norwich Union, headquarters Surrey Street (1901–06).
- Commercial Chambers, Red Lion Street (1901–03).
- London and Provincial Bank (1907).
- Norfolk and London Accident Assurance offices, 41–43 St Giles' Street (1906), later a Telephone Exchange. Now (2010), a luxury hotel.

=== Blo' Norton ===
- 1-8 Fairfields

Cromer

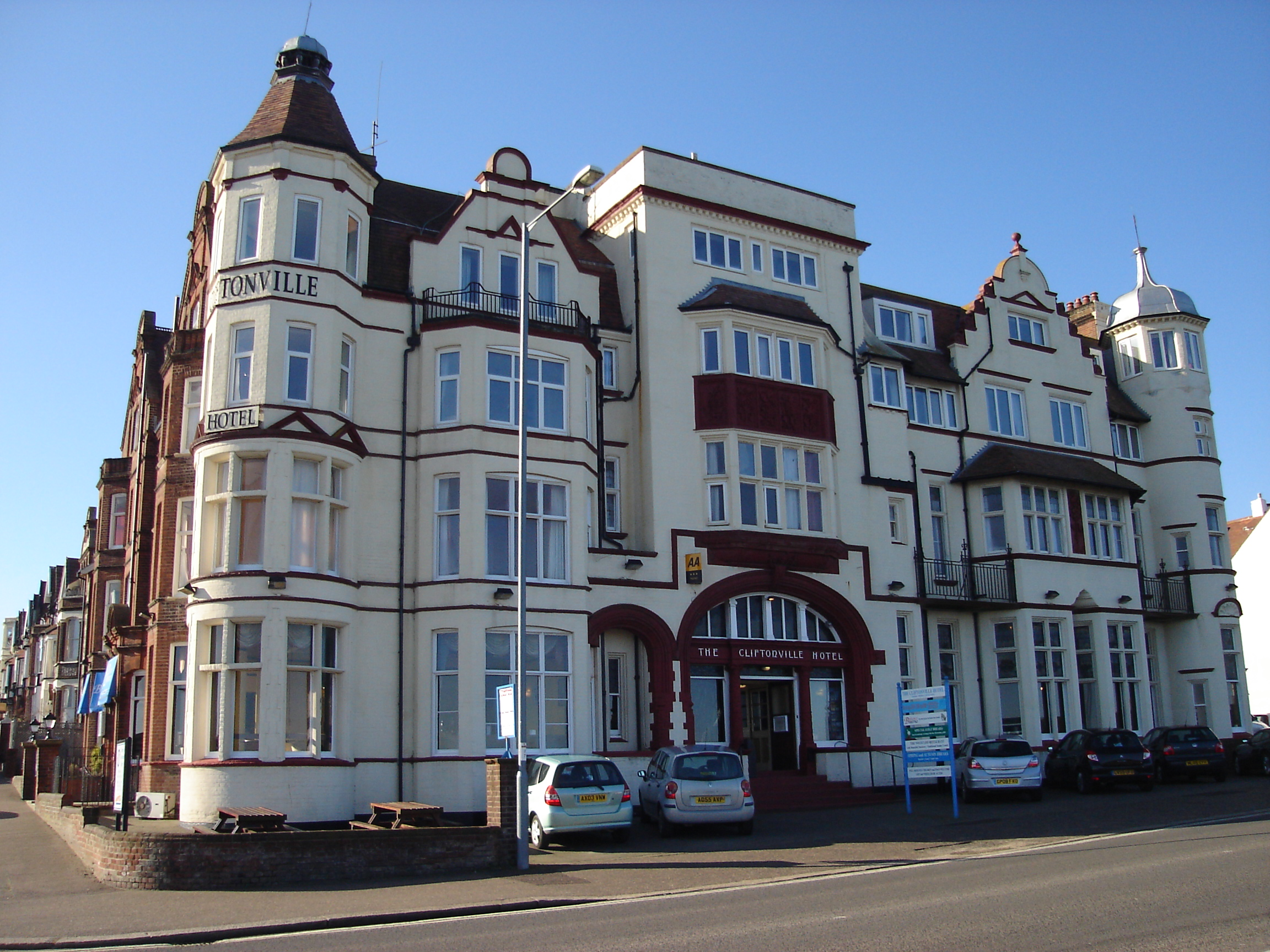
Cliftonville Hotel, Cromer

- Cliftonville Hotel
- Cromer Town Hall (1890), Extant.
- Hotel de Paris. Extensively remodelled in 1895–96.
- Hotel Metropole, (1893). Demolished.
- Grand Hotel, (1891). Demolished.
- Sandcliff Hotel (1895)

East Harling

- The Crescent - experimental council housing built with clay lump (1919-1920)

Guist

- Sennowe Hall, was redesigned by Skipper between (1904–11).

Hunstanton

- Hunstanton Town Hall

Lowestoft

- Royal Norfolk and Suffolk Yacht Club clubhouse (1903)

Somerset

- Crispin Hall, Street (1885)
- Sexey's School, Bruton (1882-1891)
- Millfield House, Millfield School, Street (1888-1889)
