= Royal Arcade, Norwich =

Shopping arcade in Norwich, England

Royal Arcade
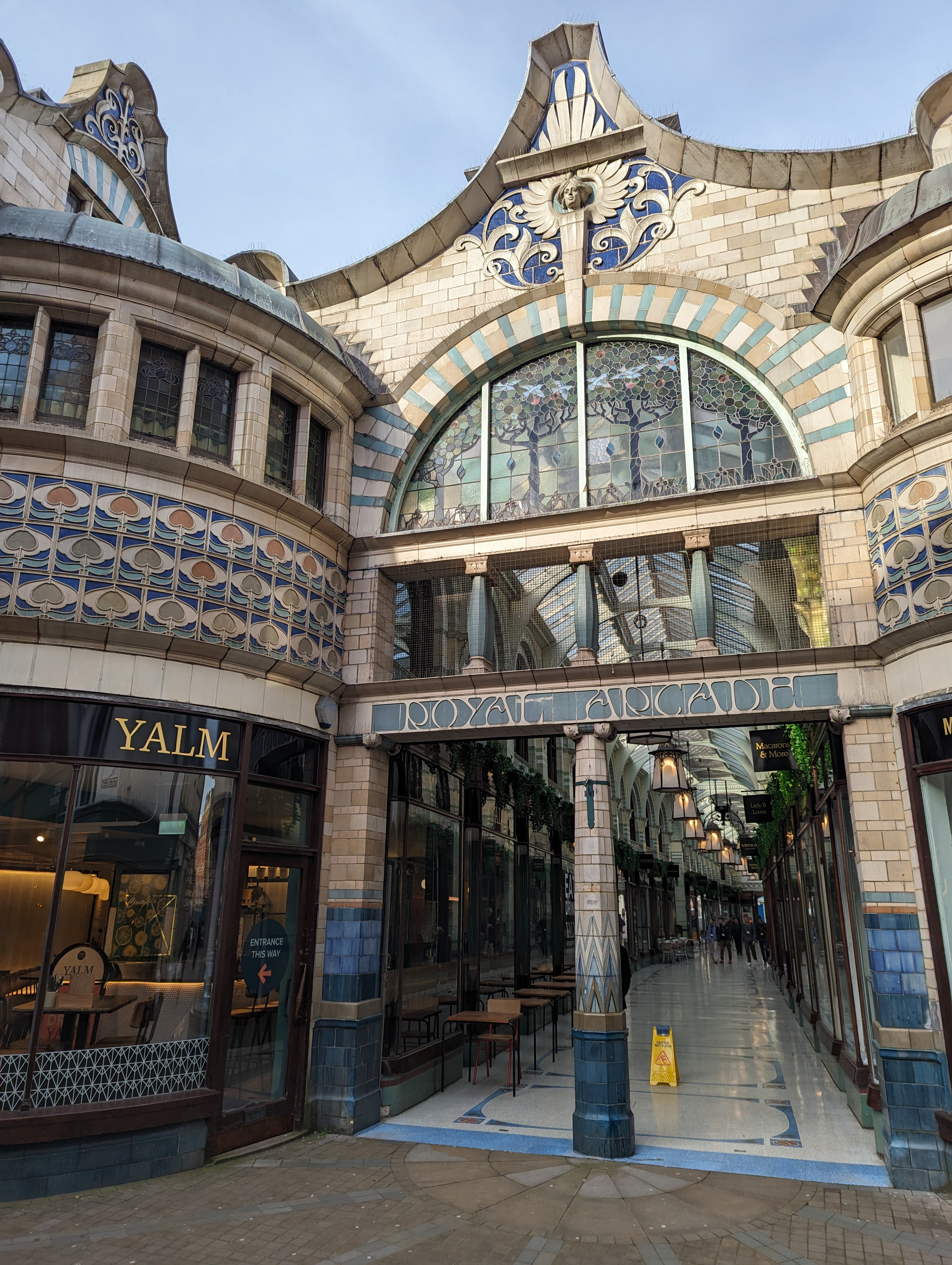
- The Royal Arcade's east entrance, featuring Parson Woodforde's Angel above
- Coordinates: 52°37′41.52″N 1°17′38.4″E
- Opened: 1899
- Architect: George Skipper
- Website: royalarcadenorwich.co.uk

The Royal Arcade is a grade II* listed shopping arcade in Norwich's city centre which runs from Norwich Market on its west side to the Back of the Inns on its east. Built in 1899, it sits on the site of the historic Angel Inn which became the Royal Hotel from 1840.

== History ==
=== The Angel and Royal Hotel ===
The Royal Arcade now sits on what was formerly the site of the Angel, a 15th-century inn and coaching house in the parish of St Peter Mancroft, which sat on the eastern side of the marketplace, facing out into Gentleman's Walk. It was one of a group of significant inns on this side of the market, known variously for serving as temporary warehouses, auction rooms and gambling halls for travellers doing business in the market, as well as the usual services of food, drink, and lodgings. It had a long, narrow central yard, which was a popular theatre and performance venue until 1699, making up for Norwich's lack of a dedicated theatre at the time.. Behind the Angel was a narrow service lane known as the Back of the Inns. The Great Cockey ran along the Back of the Inns, and thus flowed outside the back gate of the Angel.

==== 17th century ====
There are consistent records of rentals of the Angel throughout the 17th century, during which time it existed alongside other inns that took up all of the houses on the eastern side of the market. These included the Half Moon, the King's Head, the Bear, the Angel, and the White Lion, the latter being only a few yards away from the Angel. Christopher Ponder was a bookseller who operated his business from the inn from 1615 to 1624. In 1616, Edward Stephenson and his wife Amy were sent to the stocks for "abusinge of Thomas Levy the constable of St Stephens [...] causing an outrage in the same p[ar]ish and for drinking at the Angel contrary to the lawe".

As supposed by historian Fiona Williamson, the Angel may have been part of a Royalist tavern-based network in Norwich during the English Civil Wars, and was central to the events of the riot that led to the Great Blow in 1648, alongside the White Lion and King's Head. The night prior, twenty or so "gentlemen" bought rounds at the Angel on the understanding that the recipients would obstruct the mayor John Utting's departure from Norwich, according to the watch who had found them around midnight which was contrary to statute. One of these 'gentlemen' was mercer Leonard Spurgeon, who charged his pistol to rally the men at the inn and then stayed with them until all the rounds were finished at around midnight, telling them there would be a call to arms at 8am the next day. Christopher Bransby, a strong supporter of the mayor and key participant in the events of the riot, was also present at the inn for a meeting with one Doctor Brooke; Bransby went to the White Lion and then back to the Angel's lodgings to sleep. The Angel was one of the inns in the area that became the centre of contemporary intrigue into the causes for the riot that led to the Great Blow, and were mentioned in witness statements about the riot.

In 1675, Mrs Marie Pease provided entertainment at the inn, showing "twoe meeremayds" and "a devouring great eating Quaker" at the Angel's sign. In 1699, part of the Angel collapsed during a performance by the group of players led by Thomas Doggett, which killed a woman and injured many audience members. This damaged the Angel's reputation drastically; its use for full-scale theatrical performances largely ended. It remained in use for smaller-scale entertainment including puppet shows.

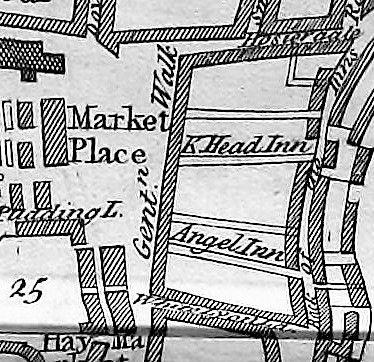
The Angel was on the eastern side of Norwich Market and near the King's Head inn (1781 map)

==== 1700–1899 ====
The Angel became a coffee house and tavern, and at one point was home to one of the city's masonic lodges. By the late 18th century, the Angel was one of four great inns at the bottom of the market place, the others being the Half Moon, the King's Head, and the Bear. James Woodforde often stopped at the inn in the late 18th century when on his way from his home in Weston Longville to London by coach, and often took coffee or supped at the Angel, but would stay at the King's Head to sleep. On Marie Tussaud's first visit to Norwich in 1819, she took the largest room in the Angel. The inn was too cramped to display her 70 to 90 wax figures, and so on her second visit in 1825 she instead used the assembly rooms at Chapel Field House. In 1840, the Angel was converted into the Royal Hotel, being renamed as such on the occasion of the wedding of Queen Victoria and Prince Albert.

=== Royal Arcade (1899–present) ===
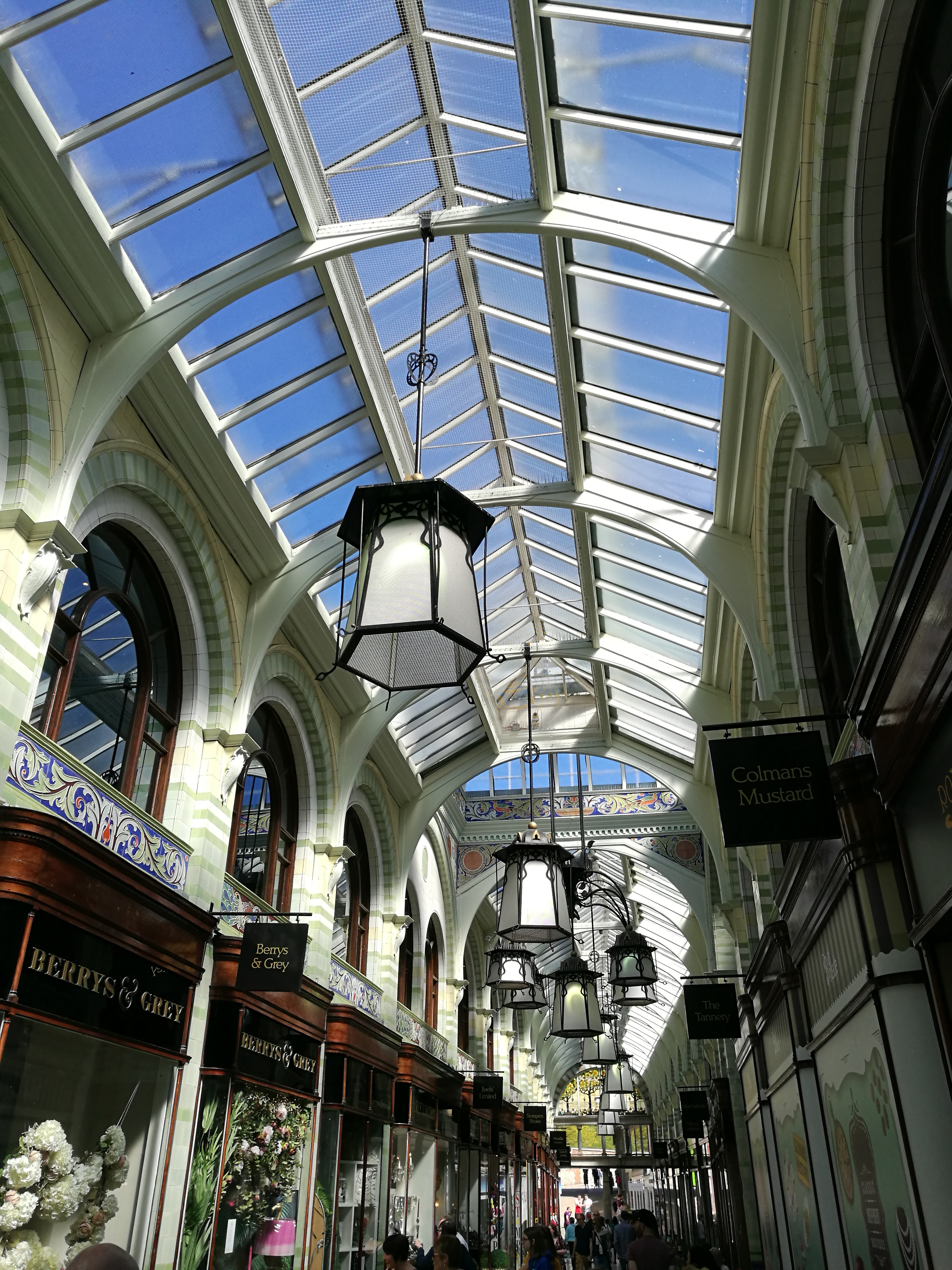
Glass roof of the Royal Arcade

The building was later demolished and replaced with Norwich's Royal Arcade in 1899, which runs eastwards from the market. The architect of the Arcade was George Skipper, the designer was William James Neatby of Royal Doulton.

In 2024, the arcade marked its 125th anniversary with a selection of events including morris dancing, food tasting, and a talk about Skipper.

==== Architecture ====
The three-storey building has ceramic tile facing, with a slate and plain tile roof by the shops and a glass and timber roof over the arcade itself. Its entry on the market side is an arch with stained glass in the semi-circular top, with bowed shopfronts to each side of the entry. This entry also has a curvilinear pediment. Its interior is two storeys and has projecting timber shopfronts. To commemorate the Angel, the image of an angel in white on blue was crafted at the entrance to the Arcade from the Back of the Inns, known as Parson Woodforde's Angel. The Back of the Inns still exists as a pedestrian street. Above the east entrance of the arcade, on the site of a former inn named the Angel, sits Parson Woodforde's Angel, an Art Nouveau style depiction of an angel in white on blue, sculpted from Doulton carrara marble. It commemorates the Angel and Woodforde's time there.

== Sources ==
- Burchell, Helen (24 May 2024). "Norwich's Royal Arcade celebrates 125 years in the city". BBC News.
- Howse, Christopher (14 March 2024). "Sacred Mysteries: The fortunes of Parson Woodforde's Angel". The Daily Telegraph. ISSN 0307-1235.
- Rawcliffe, Carole; Wilson, Richard; Clark, Christine, eds. (2004). Norwich since 1550. London; New York: Hambledon & London. ISBN 978-1-85285-450-8.
- Williamson, Fiona (16 October 2014). Social Relations and Urban Space: Norwich, 1600–1700 (1 ed.). Boydell & Brewer. doi:10.1017/9781782043959.007. ISBN 978-1-78204-395-9.
- Williamson, Fiona; Southard, Elizabeth (1 May 2015). "Drinking Houses, Popular Politics and the Middling Sorts in Early Seventeenth-Century Norwich". Cultural and Social History. 12 (1): 9–26. doi:10.2752/147800415X14135484867063.
