= Sandcliff Hotel, Cromer =

Hotel located in Croma, United Kingdom

Sandcliff Hotel
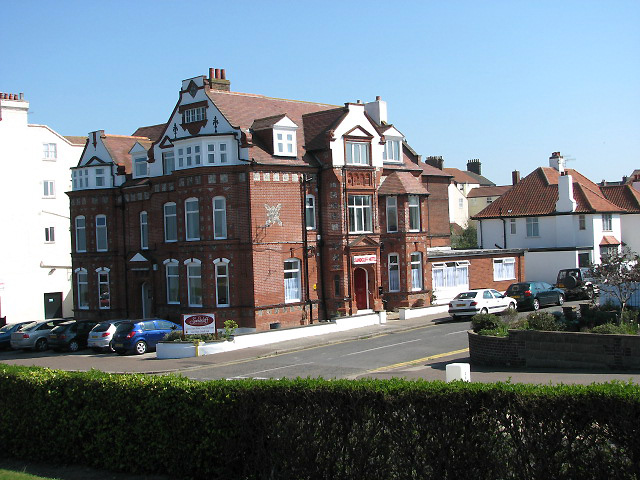
- '

- Norfolk

General information
- Location: Cromer, North Norfolk, Norfolk, England, Runton Road; Cromer; Norfolk; NR27 9AS
- Coordinates: 52°55′58.63″N 1°17′32.88″E
- Opening: 1895

Technical details
- Floor count: 3

Design and construction
- Architect: George John Skipper
- Developer: Ambrose Fox

Other information
- Number of rooms: 23 (17 en-suite)
- Parking: Yes but limited

Website
- Hotel website

The Sandcliff Hotel is an AA 3 star hotel located on the seafront in the English town of Cromer, within the county of Norfolk, United Kingdom.

== Location ==
The Sandcliff stands on the landward side of the A 149 coast road on the western outskirts of the town. It has commanding views across the esplanade to the sea, beach and the towns Victorian Pier. The hotel is 0.3 miles (0.48 km) from Cromer railway station. The nearest Airport is in Norwich and is 20.4 miles (32.8 km) south of Cromer.

== Description ==
The Sandcliff Hotel was designed by architect George John Skipper in 1894 and was built by Ambrose Fox and opened in 1895. The façades are of red brick interweaved with ornamental brickwork and well crafted panels of knapped flintwork.
