= Richard Condon (impresario) =

Irish impresario

Richard Condon (born 1937 in Belfast– died 1991 in County Mayo), was an impresario and theatre manager.

Condon, affectionately known as Dick was made theatre manager of the Theatre Royal, Norwich in 1972. During his tenure, the genial Irishman transformed the theatre into one of the most popular in Europe. On leaving the theatre after a funding dispute, he formed a partnership with the Pavilion Theatre, Cromer Pier and helped to produce the ever-popular Seaside Special. In 1987, he was appointed general manager of the revived D'Oyly Carte Opera Company, helping to restart the company in 1988.

After his death the Eastern Daily Press wrote that he was among the "best known and assuredly best loved figures in Norfolk"
