= Cromer Shoal Chalk Beds =

Chalk reef off the coast of Cromer, Norfolk in the United Kingdom

- Interactive map of Cromer Shoal Chalk Beds
- Location: Norfolk, England
- Length: 30 km (19 mi)
- Width: 10 km (6.2 mi)
- Area: 320 km^{2} (120 sq mi)
- Established: January 2016

The Cromer Shoal Chalk Beds are a chalk reef off the coast Norfolk in the United Kingdom, believed to be the largest chalk reef in Europe. Since January 2016, an area around it has been designated as a Marine Conservation Zone. Although the MCZ is named after chalk beds off Cromer the most dramatic features are off Sheringham. A chalk bedrock seabed actually extends under much of the Southern North Sea and is exposed underwater and at the shore - as veneers of sand and sediment move with sea action. The chalk is most notably exposed at the shore as rock pools at West Runton. They are home to more than 700 marine species, including a species of purple Hymedesmia sponge, Hymedesmia sp. 'Parpal Dumplin', unique to the area first identified there in 2011.

The Marine Conservation Zone. has an area of about 321 km^{2}, starting 200 m away from the coastline and extending about 10 km out into the North Sea, it stretches from west of Weybourne to Happisburgh. The 200 m offset was applied due to pressure from local communities who believed the designation would prevent sea defense work if it reached the high tide mark. This was a mistake as MCZ status does not bring any default prohibition of coastal works.
