= Cliftonville Hotel, Cromer =

Hotel in Cromer, England

Cliftonville Hotel
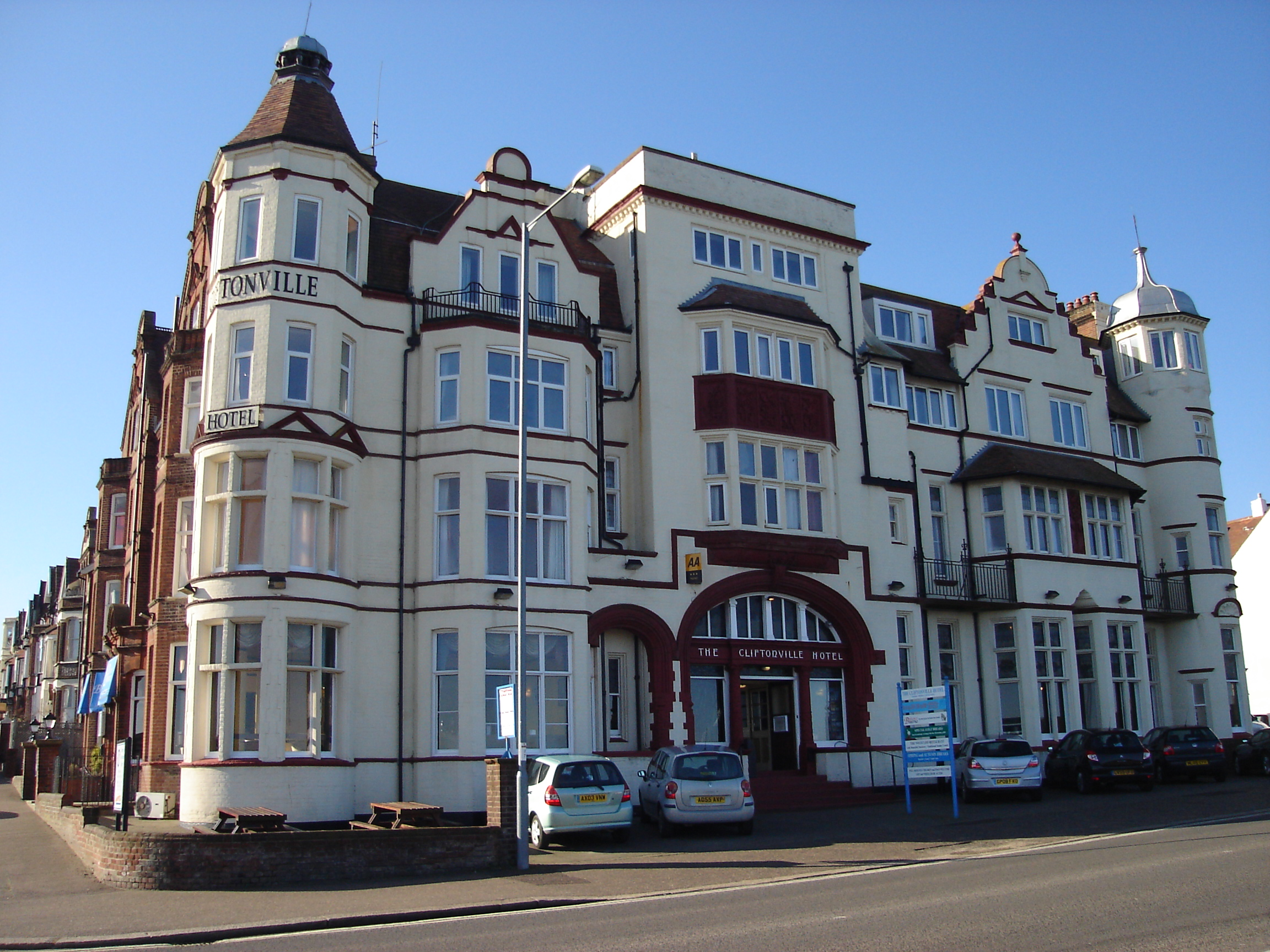

- Norfolk

General information
- Location: Cromer, North Norfolk, Norfolk, England, 29 Runton Road; Cromer; Norfolk; NR27 9AS
- Coordinates: 52°55′58.43″N 1°17′34.75″E
- Opening: 1894

Technical details
- Floor count: 4

Design and construction
- Architects: Augustus Frederick Scott (Further developments)George John Skipper

Other information
- Number of rooms: 30 en-suite bedrooms
- Number of restaurants: 2 (Bolton's Bistro & Westcliff)
- Parking: yes

Website
- Hotel Website

Listed Building – Grade II
- Designated: 15 September 2003
- Reference no.: 1390731

The Cliftonville Hotel is an AA 3 star Hotel, and Grade II listed building, located in the English seaside town of Cromer in the county of Norfolk, United Kingdom.

== Location ==
The hotel stands on the landward side of the A 149 coast road on the western outskirts of the town. It has views across the esplanade to the sea, beach and the towns Victorian Pier. The hotel is 0.3 miles (0.48 km) from Cromer railway station. The nearest airport is in Norwich and is 20.4 miles (32.8 km) south of Cromer.

== Description ==
The hotel has 30 en-suite bedrooms over three floors, all rooms have been refurbished in 2022/2023. The rooms situated in the east wing are accessible by a lift. On the ground floor there is a reception area, recently refurbished lounge area and a bar & restaurant area. The Ballroom with spring loaded floor and Minstrels' Gallery is available for private hire.

== History ==
The Edwardian Hotel started out as the Cliftonville boarding house and was designed in 1894 by the architect Augustus Frederick Scott for William Churchyard of Westbourne House, West Street, Cromer. In 1898 the hotel was further improved and extended with new facade facing Runton Road, under the control of architect George John Skipper. This new façade was done in the decorative Arts and Craft style fashionable at that time. The ornate carved brickwork was hand carved by a Mr Minns, who had also been employed on the work designed by Skipper for Cromer Town Hall. Between 1925 and 1932 the hotel came under the ownership of Albert Ernest Willins. After the outbreak of the Second World War the hotel was used to billet troops sent to North Norfolk to guard the coast from invasion. The hotel still retains many of its Edwardian architectural features including a fine main staircase, stained glass windows and a classic Minstrels’ Gallery which are all designed by Skipper.

== Gallery ==
Cliftonville Hotel

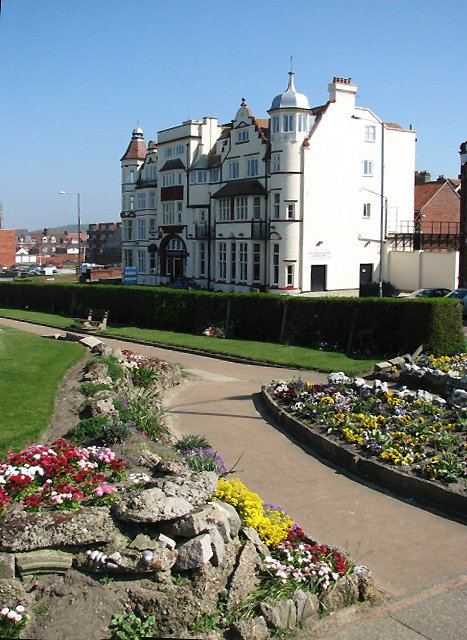

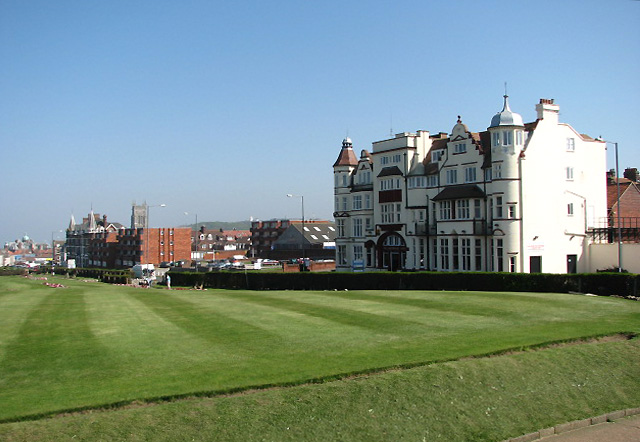

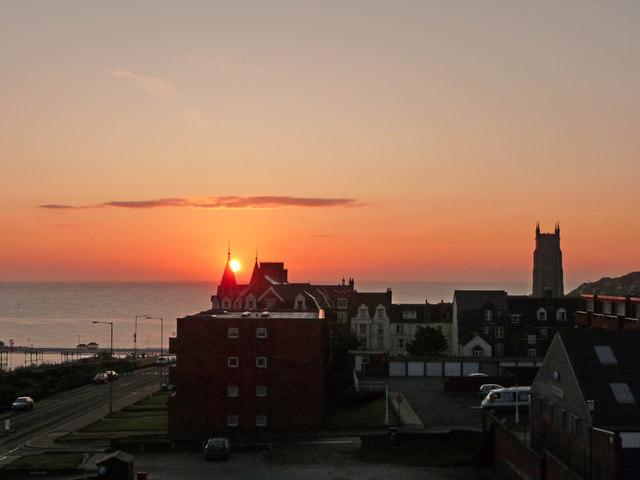
