= Old Town Hall, Cromer =

Municipal building in Cromer, Norfolk, England

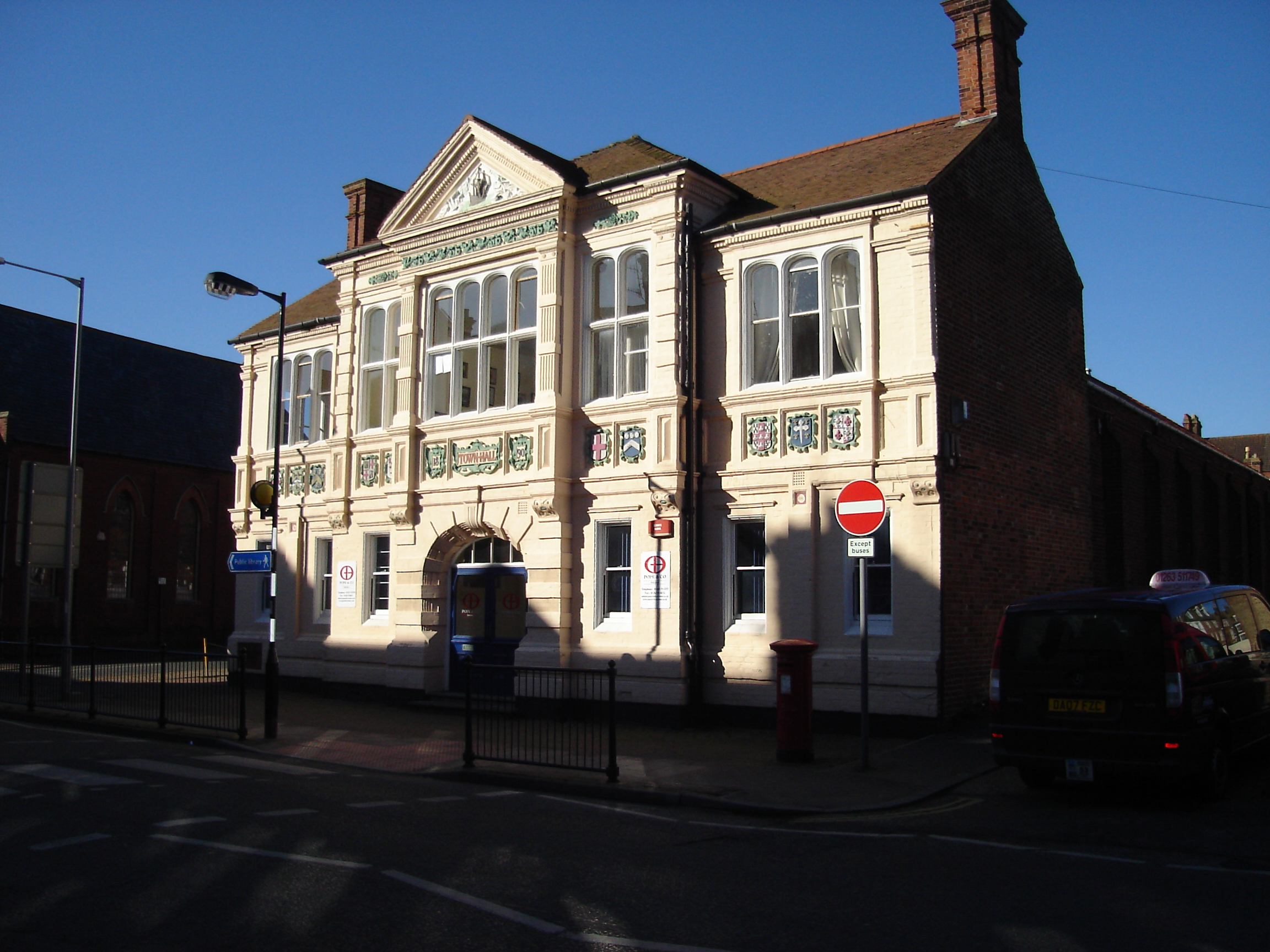
- Old Town Hall, Cromer

- Shown in Norfolk
- 52.9314°N 1.2975°E
- Location: Prince of Wales Road, Cromer

History
- Built: 1890

Site notes
- Architect: George Skipper
- Architectural style: Queen Anne style

Listed Building – Grade II
- Official name: Old Town Hall
- Designated: 21 January 1977
- Reference no.: 1171785

The Old Town Hall is a former events venue in Prince of Wales Road, Cromer, Norfolk, England. The structure, which is currently used for retail purposes, is a grade II listed building.

== History ==
In the mid-19th century, a group of local businessmen decided to form a company to raise funds for the erection of an events venue in the town. The site they selected was on the west side of Prince of Wales Road and the foundation stone was laid by Mrs Benjamin Bond-Cabbell of Cromer Hall on 3 January 1890. The building was designed by George Skipper in the Queen Anne style, built in red brick with a stucco finish by Chapman and Son of Norwich and was completed later that year.

The design involved a symmetrical main frontage with five bays facing onto Prince of Wales Road; the central bay, which slightly projected forward, featured, on the ground floor, a round headed doorway and, on the first floor, a four-part window flanked by fluted pilasters supporting a modillioned pediment with an illustration of a sailing ship in the tympanum. (Note: The sailing ship depicts the local tradition that the local mariner, Robert Bacon, discovered Iceland in 1405.) The bays on either side of the central bay were fenestrated by sash windows on the ground floor and by two-part windows on the first floor while the outer bays were fenestrated by pairs of sash windows on the ground floor and by three-part windows on the first floor. Between the two floors there was a panel bearing the coats of arms of the first lord of the manor, Sir Nicholas de Weyland, of the mariner, Robert Bacon, of the locally-born Lord Mayor of London, Sir Bartholomew Reade, and of the later lords of the manor, Lord Suffield and Benjamin Bond-Cabbell, as well as those of other prominent local families. Internally, the principal room was the main assembly hall which was designed to accommodate 900 people.

Following significant population growth, largely associated with the tourism industry, the area became an urban district in 1894. However, rather than using the town hall, the new council chose to establish its offices at the corner of West Street and Chapel Street in 1908, before relocating to North Lodge Park in 1928. Following the Second World War, during which time the town hall was requisitioned for military use, it resumed its role as a theatre and performers included the actor, Bernard Archard, who appeared in a production entitled The Regency Players, in 1960.

The building was acquired by a firm of wine merchants in 1963, when the company that had developed it was wound up. The town hall was then acquired by a property developer and let to the Co-op in 1991, before being restored with funding from English Heritage in 1994. In the early 21st century, it was occupied by a firm of solicitors, and, in September 2020, it re-opened as a shop known as "Harbord's Artisan Vintage Emporium".
