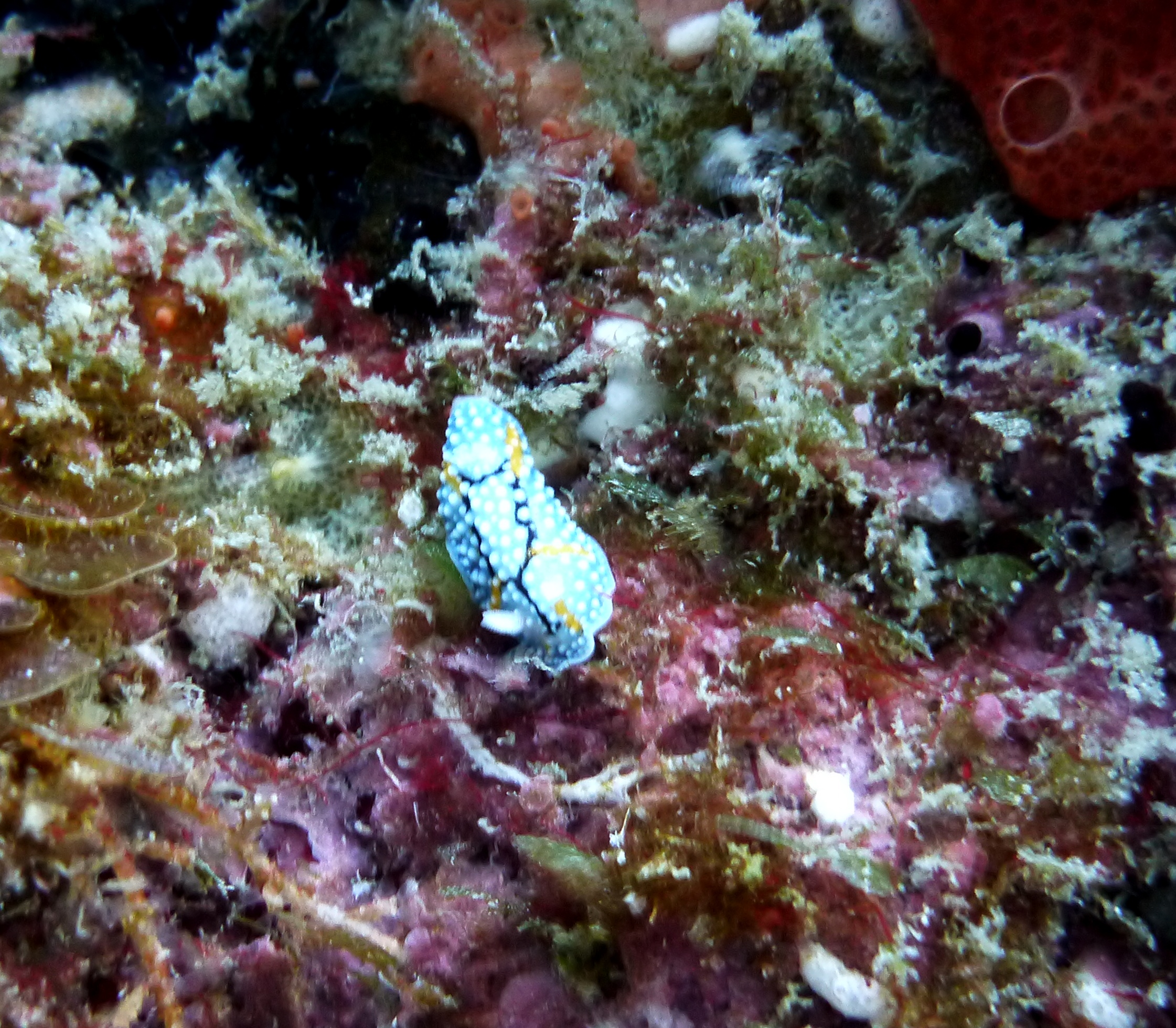
- Aldisa albatrossae off the Bonin Islands, Japan.

Scientific classification
- Kingdom: Animalia
- Phylum: Mollusca
- Class: Gastropoda
- Order: Nudibranchia
- Family: Cadlinidae
- Genus: Aldisa
- Species: A. albatrossae

Binomial name
- Aldisa albatrossae Elwood, Valdés & Gossliner, 2000

= Aldisa albatrossae =

Species of gastropod

Aldisa albatrossae is a species of sea slug, a dorid nudibranch, a marine gastropod mollusc in the family Cadlinidae.

== Distribution ==
Described from Seragaki, Okinawa, Japan, this demersal nudibranch has a wide distribution in the tropical Pacific region. It has been found at depths between 3 and 72 m, in diverse places: Okinawa, the Philippines and North Sulawesi.

== Description ==
Aldisa albatrossae is a rather small nudibranch, with a length between 11 and 22 mm. The bluish gray dorsum is covered with many white, round tubercles. Typically there is a black line which starts in front of the rhinophores, and continues in a rectangular shape to the gills at the back. This black line then encompasses the gills. There are also yellow-orange markings on the corners of the rectangle. The lamellate rhinophores have a translucent, dirty-white color. The bipinnate gills only have a few branches, and have the same dirty white color. It is believed to mimic species of Phyllidiella and shares this characteristic with some other species of Aldisa such as Aldisa williamsi, Aldisa erwinkoehleri and unrelated dorid nudibranchs such as Paradoris liturata.
