= Hymedesmia occulta =

Scientific classification
- Kingdom: Animalia
- Phylum: Porifera
- Class: Demospongiae
- Order: Poecilosclerida
- Family: Hymedesmiidae
- Genus: Hymedesmia
- Species: H. occulta

Binomial name
- Hymedesmia occulta Bowerbank, 1864

Species of sponge

Hymedesmia occulta is a species of demosponge in the family Hymedesmiidae.

== Distribution ==
This species was described from Shetland, United Kingdom where it was dredged by Rev A.M. Norman. It has been reported from scattered locations in the N.E. Atlantic in depths between 180 and 2400 m.

== Description ==
This sponge has acanthostyles of two size classes, the large ones are long and evenly tapering; they are slightly curved, the curvature as a rule placed more or less near the base; the head is only slightly swollen, but somewhat distinct, it is densely covered with spines which are blunt; from the head and a little way out there are spines, decreasing in size outwards, the remainder of the shaft is smooth, or has only scarcely perceptible and scattered grains. The small acanthostyli are straight or nearly so; they have a small head which, however, seems larger on account of its somewhat long, radiating spines; they are spined in their whole length, the spines on the shaft are reclined. The length of the long acanthostyli is 470-1190 μm, and the diameter of the head 25-37 μm; the small styli are 120-260 μm long, with a diameter of the head of 20-25 μm. Developmental stages of both sizes of the styli were seen in small numbers, showing that the two sizes are essentially different from the beginning. The dermal spicules are tornota with intermediates to oxea; they are straight and long tapering; they vary a good deal in thickness, when they are thin they may be termed tornota, but often they are more fusiform and are then oxea; their length is 340-440 μm with a thickness of 8-13 μm. Besides these spicules there are some much thicker fusiform oxea of a length of 380-500 μm and with a thickness in the middle of 17-28 μm. The microscleres are chelae arcuatae; they have an evenly curved shaft, the terminal parts are relatively small, and the alae are somewhat triangular; the length is 34-40 μm; the shaft is not cylindrical but a little flattened, the thickness is in relation to this 3-5 μm. The chelae occur through the whole sponge and outermost in the dermal membrane; they are especially numerous in the pore-membranes.
