= Phorbas pustulosus =

Scientific classification
- Kingdom: Animalia
- Phylum: Porifera
- Class: Demospongiae
- Order: Poecilosclerida
- Family: Hymedesmiidae
- Genus: Phorbas
- Species: P. pustulosus

Binomial name
- Phorbas pustulosus (Carter, 1882)

Synonyms
- Anaata pustulosa (Carter, 1882); Clathria (Microciona) pustulosa (Carter, 1882); Halichondria pustulosa (Carter, 1882); Pronax pustulosa (Carter, 1882)

Species of sponge

Phorbas pustulosus, or the baseball glove sponge, is a species of demosponge known from the coast of South Africa and from the Patagonian Shelf.

== Description ==
This pale dirty peach sponge grows upright with its irregular branches forming a hand-like form. The surface is slightly rough and covered in bumps, also known as pustules. It is firm and tough. It may grow up to a length of 130 millimetres (5.1 inches) and a width of 120 mm (4.7 in).

== Distribution ==
The baseball glove sponge is known from the southern and western coasts of South Africa and from the Patagonian Shelf. It is found at a depth of 43–128 m (141–420 ft).
