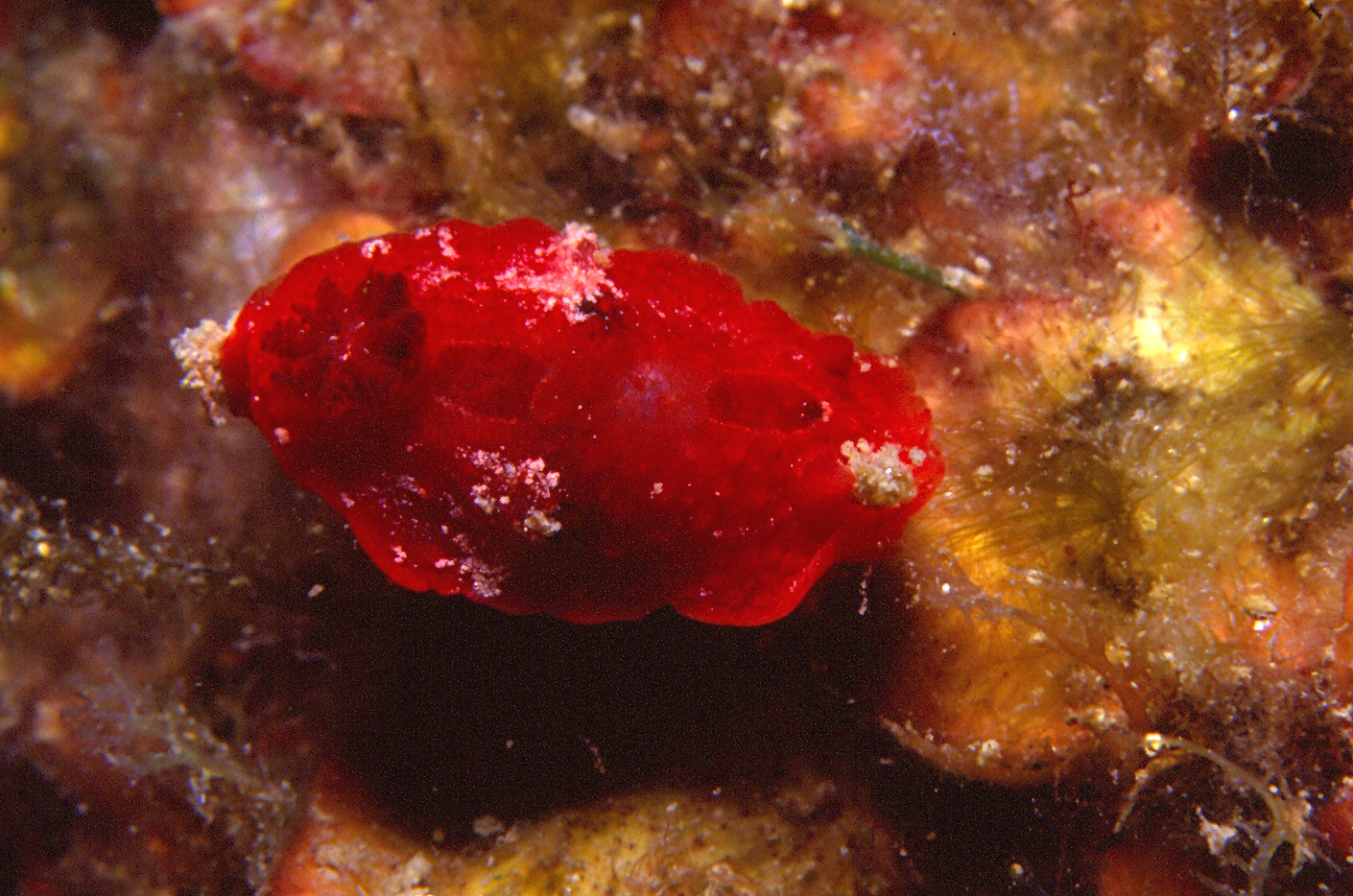

Scientific classification
- Kingdom: Animalia
- Phylum: Mollusca
- Class: Gastropoda
- Order: Nudibranchia
- Family: Cadlinidae
- Genus: Aldisa
- Species: A. banyulensis

Binomial name
- Aldisa banyulensis Pruvot-Fol, 1951

= Aldisa banyulensis =

Species of gastropod

Aldisa banyulensis is a species of sea slug, a dorid nudibranch, a marine gastropod mollusk in the family Cadlinidae.

== Distribution ==
This species was described from Banyuls-sur-Mer, France. It is also reported from the Mediterranean coast of Spain.

== Description ==
Aldisa banyulensis is a small sea slug that is normally 8–12 mm in length. It is red or orange-red in colour with two oval markings on the midline of the back which resemble the inhalent pore-sieves of its sponge food. There are pale streaks running from the sides of the back to the edge of the mantle and between the rhinophores.

== Ecology ==
This species is reported to feed on the sponge Hemimycale columella (Hymedesmiidae).
