= Hymedesmia pharos =

Scientific classification
- Kingdom: Animalia
- Phylum: Porifera
- Class: Demospongiae
- Order: Poecilosclerida
- Family: Hymedesmiidae
- Genus: Hymedesmia
- Species: H. pharos

Binomial name
- Hymedesmia pharos Goodwin, Brewin & Brickle, 2012

Species of sponge

Hymedesmia pharos is a species of demosponge first found on the coast of South Georgia island, in the south west Southern Ocean.
