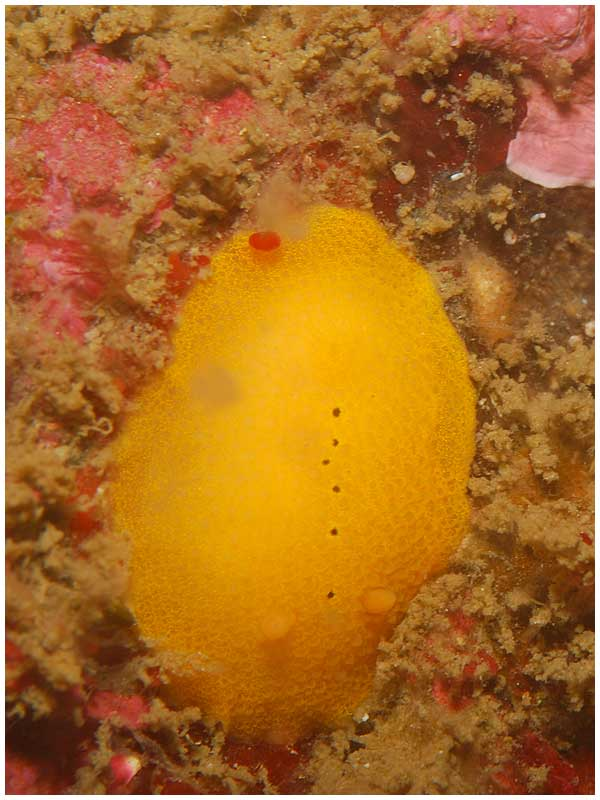
- Aldisa cooperi, head end towards the bottom of this image

Scientific classification
- Kingdom: Animalia
- Phylum: Mollusca
- Class: Gastropoda
- Order: Nudibranchia
- Family: Cadlinidae
- Genus: Aldisa
- Species: A. cooperi

Binomial name
- Aldisa cooperi (Robilliard & Baba, 1972)

Synonyms
- Aldisa sanguinea cooperi Robilliard & Baba, 1972

= Aldisa cooperi =

Species of gastropod

Aldisa cooperi is a species of sea slug, a dorid nudibranch, a marine gastropod mollusc in the family Cadlinidae.

== Distribution ==
This demersal nudibranch is found in cold to temperate waters, from the intertidal to subtidal zones (up to a depth of 20 m), along the Pacific coast of North America, from California to Alaska. It has also been reported from the coasts of Japan and Korea.

== Description ==
Cooper's aldisa is a small dorid nudibranch, growing to a length of 25 mm. Its mantle has a yellow to orange color, with some black spots spread over it. It has a smooth body covered with sparse, low tubercles and gills clustered on the posterior part of its body. It lays its eggs in ribbons.

== Conservation status ==
The vulnerability of this species is low to moderate, but it is not listed in the IUCN Red List.

== Ecology ==
It is usually found nestled in its food sponge Anthoarcuata graciae. This sponge is currently classified as a member of the genus Antho, family Clathriidae, but may actually belong to the family Hymedesmiidae as other Aldisa species specialise on sponges from this family.
