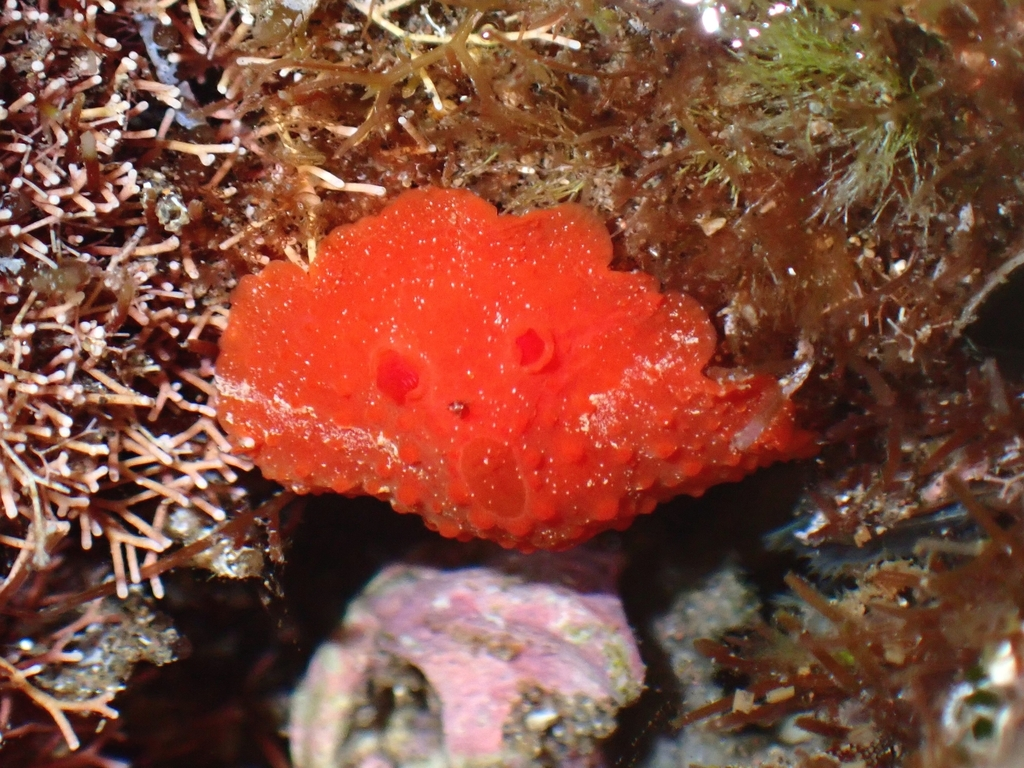

Scientific classification
- Kingdom: Animalia
- Phylum: Mollusca
- Class: Gastropoda
- Order: Nudibranchia
- Family: Cadlinidae
- Genus: Aldisa
- Species: A. smaragdina

Binomial name
- Aldisa smaragdina Ortea, Pérez & Llera, 1982

Synonyms
- ? Aldisa binotata Pruvot-Fol, 1953

= Aldisa smaragdina =

Species of gastropod

Aldisa smaragdina is a species of sea slug, a dorid nudibranch, a marine gastropod mollusk in the family Cadlinidae.

== Distribution ==
This species was described from the Canary Islands. It has subsequently been reported from the Atlantic coast of Spain and from Portugal.

== Description ==
This species has raised rounded tubercles covering the dorsum. There are two round markings on the back which are darker in colour. The animal grows to 30 mm in length.

== Ecology ==
This nudibranch feeds on the hymedesmiid sponge Phorbas fictitius ( aka Anchinoe fictitius). The two darker round markings on the back of the animal closely resemble the inhalant pore sieves of Phorbas, providing excellent camouflage. A progesterone homologue has been isolated from this species.
