= Hamigera =

Hamigera may refer to:

- Hamigera (sponge), a genus of sponges in the family Hymedesmiidae
- Hamigera (fungus), a genus of funguses in the family Aspergillaceae
