= Hymedesmia armigera =

Scientific classification
- Kingdom: Animalia
- Phylum: Porifera
- Class: Demospongiae
- Order: Poecilosclerida
- Family: Hymedesmiidae
- Genus: Hymedesmia
- Species: H. armigera

Binomial name
- Hymedesmia armigera Bowerbank, 1882

Species of sponge

Hymedesmia armigera is a species of demosponge in the family Hymedesmiidae.

== Distribution ==
This species was described from Roundstone Bay, Ireland where it was collected by Rev. A.M Norman. It has not been reported since.

== Description ==
This sponge was entangled in a piece of maerl (Phymatolithon calcareum). It has acanthostyles of variable length, 80-260 μm in length, all entirely spined. The skeleton spicules are fusiform tornotes or straight oxea, 210 μm in length and the chelae are 16-20 μm, with small alae and a long, thin, curved shaft.
