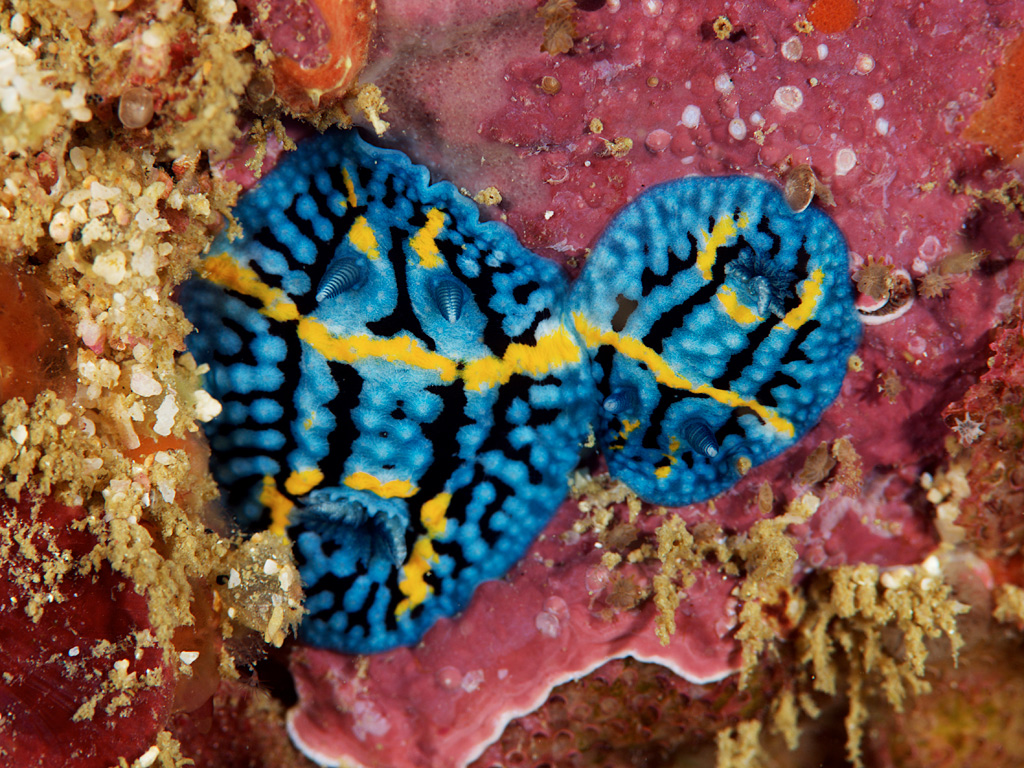
- A mating pair of the nudibranch Aldisa andersoni, Mirissa, Sri Lanka.

Scientific classification
- Kingdom: Animalia
- Phylum: Mollusca
- Class: Gastropoda
- Order: Nudibranchia
- Family: Cadlinidae
- Genus: Aldisa
- Species: A. andersoni

Binomial name
- Aldisa andersoni Gosliner & Behrens, 2004

= Aldisa andersoni =

Species of gastropod

Aldisa andersoni is a species of sea slug, a dorid nudibranch, a marine gastropod mollusk in the family Cadlinidae.

== Distribution ==
This species was described from Pigeon Island, Trincomalee, Sri Lanka. It has subsequently been reported from the Muttom coast, India, and Mirissa, Southern Province, Sri Lanka.

== Ecology ==
Aldisa andersoni has been found to contain Phorbazole metabolites which are probably derived from its food, a sponge in the family Hymedesmiidae.
