= Hymedesmia acerata =

Scientific classification
- Kingdom: Animalia
- Phylum: Porifera
- Class: Demospongiae
- Order: Poecilosclerida
- Family: Hymedesmiidae
- Genus: Hymedesmia
- Species: H. acerata

Binomial name
- Hymedesmia acerata Topsent, 1904

Synonyms
- Leptosia acerata Topsent, 1904; Stylopus aceratus Topsent, 1904

Species of marine demosponge

Hymedesmia acerata is a species of marine demosponge in the family Hymedesmiidae. It has been found in the Azores on pumice stones and fragments of polyparia.

== Description ==
The species is a yellow-white or green-yellow color. Its growth for is that of extensive plates that are not thin, and are fleshy and smooth. It lacks microscleres, but it does have megasclera that take one of two forms. The first is the ordinary type which are straight, pointed, and of various lengths with fairly brittle thorns. The other has extremely abundant ectosomes and are long, straight, and tipped.

== Taxonomy ==
The holotype of the species that would become known as Hymedesmia acerata was collected by Émile Topsent in the Azores in 1896 under the name Leptosia acerata. Topsent also described specimens he collected as Stylopus aceratus. The genus Stylopus was later subsumed by Hymedesmia and demoted to a subgenus; thus, Stylopus aceratus was synonymized with Hymedesmia acerata and the species was placed in Hydemedesmia subg. Stylopus.
