= Hymedesmia zetlandica =

Scientific classification
- Kingdom: Animalia
- Phylum: Porifera
- Class: Demospongiae
- Order: Poecilosclerida
- Family: Hymedesmiidae
- Genus: Hymedesmia
- Species: H. zetlandica

Binomial name
- Hymedesmia zetlandica Bowerbank, 1864

Species of sponge

Hymedesmia zetlandica is a species of demosponge in the family Hymedesmiidae. It is the type species of the genus Hymedesmia.

== Distribution ==
This species was described from Shetland, United Kingdom where it was dredged by Mr George Barlee.

== Description ==
This sponge has short acanthostyles with robust spines, rather different to many other species in the genus Hymedesmia. The skeleton spicules are parallel-sided tylotes with the ends swollen in a way more characteristic of the subgenus Lissodendoryx (Ectyodoryx) than most other species currently included in Hymedesmia. The microscleres are chelae, curious spined chelae and numerous thin sigmata, which are in bundles.
