= Hymedesmia simillima =

Scientific classification
- Kingdom: Animalia
- Phylum: Porifera
- Class: Demospongiae
- Order: Poecilosclerida
- Family: Hymedesmiidae
- Genus: Hymedesmia
- Species: H. simillima

Binomial name
- Hymedesmia simillima Lundbeck, 1910

Species of sponge

Hymedesmia simillima is a species of demosponge in the family Hymedesmiidae.

== Distribution ==
This species was described from East Greenland.

== Description ==
The skeletal spicules are acanthostyli which are divided into two rather well defined groups of sizes. The large styli are straight or generally slightly curved near the head which is small or not very pronounced; the spines are only present on the head and a little way out. The small styli are straight, the head is very small and apparent only due to the somewhat longish, radiating spines; the style is spined nearly in the whole length, only a small apical part being smooth; the spines are often reclined; they are of moderate size or small. The length of the large styli is 410-650 μm with a diameter of the head of 20-28 μm, and of the small styli 160-190 μm and the thickness of the head about 21 μm. The dermal spicules are oxea with transitions to tornota; they are straight and generally more or less fusiform and somewhat long tapering oxea, the thinner ones are more cylindrical with shorter points and could be called tornota. The length, which may vary a little in various specimens, is on the whole 320-470 μm with a diameter in the middle of 6-14 μm. The spicules have generally not quite equal ends, but one end is slightly thinner than the other; the thinner the spicule is the more pronounced is this difference, and some few very fine developmental stages were quite monactinal, thus showing that the spicule begins as monactinal. Besides these dermal spicules there are also in this species, as in Hymedesmia occulta, some thicker, fusiform oxea, they have a length of 290-350 μm with a thickness in the middle of 15-17 μm; they are very scarce, and as the measurements show, they seem to be connected in size with the ordinary spicules, only being specially short and thick, and in contrast to the case in Hymedesmia occulta they are shorter than the ordinary dermal spicules. So far as I have seen, these thicker spicules are found in the outer part of the fibres, just at the dermal membrane, The microscleres are chelae arcuatae; they have a strongly, sometimes semicircularly curved shaft, the alae are lobe-shaped, and short and round; the length is 28-37 μm, the most strongly curved may sometimes be a little shorter; the shaft is somewhat flattened, its thickness is in accordance herewith 4-7 μm; developmental stages were seen in small numbers. The chelae are seen through the whole sponge, but only in small numbers, in the dermal membrane they form on the other hand a more or less dense layer, and they are numerous in the pore-membrane.
