= Hymedesmia sp. 'Parpal Dumplin' =

Scientific classification
- Kingdom: Animalia
- Phylum: Porifera
- Class: Demospongiae
- Order: Poecilosclerida
- Family: Hymedesmiidae
- Genus: Hymedesmia
- Subgenus: Stylopus
- Species: H. sp. 'Parpal Dumplin'

Binomial name
- Hymedesmia sp. 'Parpal Dumplin'

Species of sponge

Hymedesmia sp. 'Parpal Dumplin' is a species of demosponge in the subgenus Stylopus. It was discovered in the north Norfolk chalk beds of the North Sea by volunteer divers in 2011. The species is yet to be assigned a full scientific binomial name, and is therefore currently referred to by its common name.
