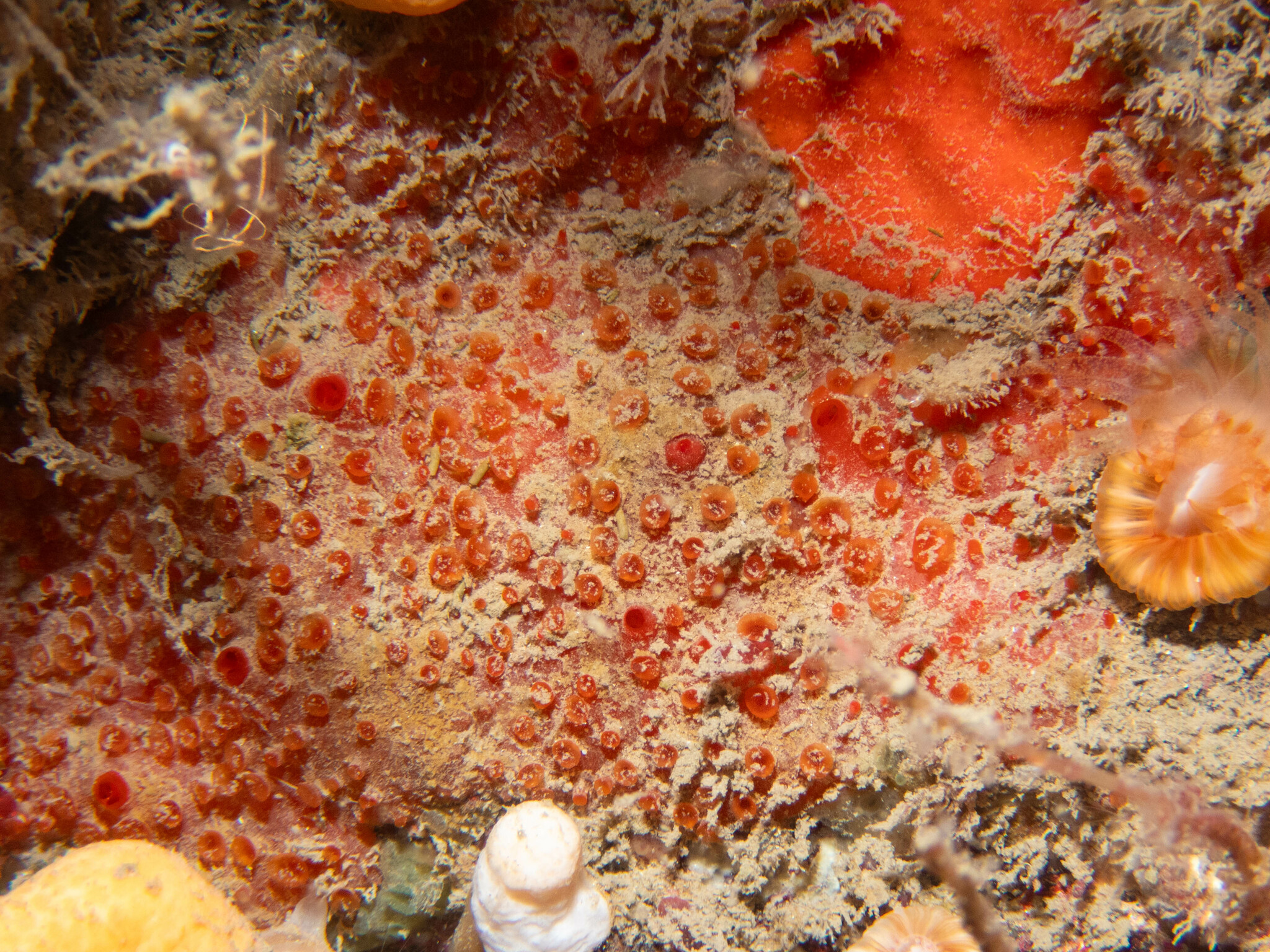

Scientific classification
- Kingdom: Animalia
- Phylum: Porifera
- Class: Demospongiae
- Order: Poecilosclerida
- Family: Hymedesmiidae
- Genus: Hymedesmia
- Species: H. jecusculum

Binomial name
- Hymedesmia jecusculum Bowerbank, 1866

= Hymedesmia jecusculum =

Species of sponge

Hymedesmia jecusculum is a species of demosponge in the family Hymedesmiidae.

== Distribution ==
This species was described from a cave on the coast of Harris in the Outer Hebrides, Scotland, United Kingdom where it was collected at low water spring tides by Captain F.W.L Thomas of the Hydrological Survey.

== Description ==
This sponge has acanthostyles of two size classes, 360-430 μm and 120-140 μm in length. The skeleton spicules are slightly fusiform tornotes with one end pointed and the other slightly rounded, 270-350 μm in length. The chelae are curved isochelae with the alae equal to the gap between them, 20-26 μm in length.
