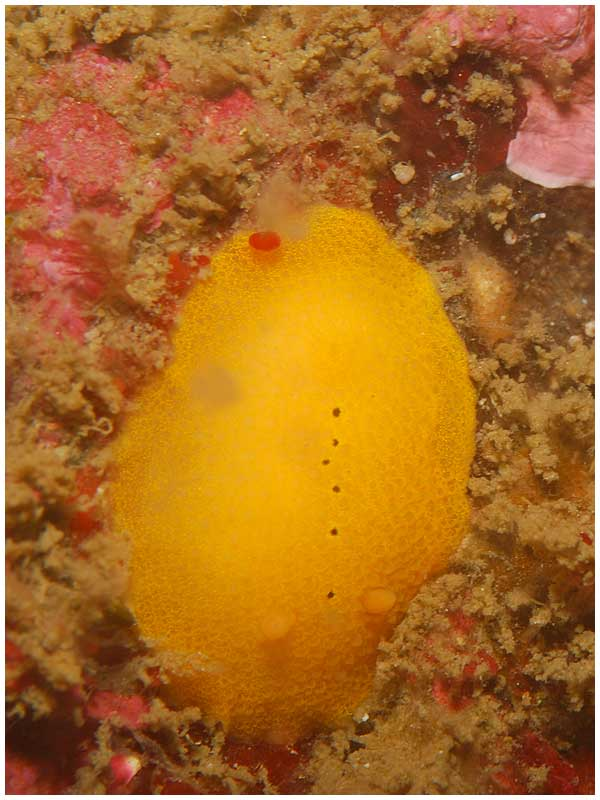
- Aldisa cooperi, head end towards the bottom of the image

Scientific classification
- Kingdom: Animalia
- Phylum: Mollusca
- Class: Gastropoda
- Order: Nudibranchia
- Infraorder: Doridoidei
- Superfamily: Doridoidea
- Family: Cadlinidae
- Genus: Aldisa; Bergh, 1878

Type species
- Doris zetlandica Alder & Hancock, 1854

Species
- See text

= Aldisa =

Genus of gastropods

Aldisa is a genus of sea slugs, dorid nudibranchs, marine gastropod molluscs in the family Cadlinidae.

== Species ==
Species within the genus Aldisa include:

- Aldisa alabastrina (J. G. Cooper, 1863)
- Aldisa albatrossae Elwood, Valdés & Gosliner, 2000
- Aldisa albomarginata Millen in Millen & Gosliner, 1985
- Aldisa andersoni Gosliner & Behrens, 2004
- Aldisa banyulensis Pruvot-Fol, 1951
- Aldisa barlettai Ortea & Ballesteros, 1989
- Aldisa benguelae Gosliner in Millen & Gosliner, 1985
- Aldisa binotata Pruvot-Fol, 1953
- Aldisa cooperi Robilliard & Baba, 1972
- Aldisa erwinkoehleri Perrone, 2001
- Aldisa expleta Ortea, Perez, & Llera, 1981
- Aldisa fragaria Tibiriçá, Pola & Cervera, 2017
- Aldisa pikokai Bertsch & Johnson, 1982
- Aldisa puntallanensis Moro & Ortea, 2011
- Aldisa sanguinea (J. G. Cooper, 1863) - Blood-spot doris
- Aldisa smaragdina Ortea, Pérez & Llera, 1982
- Aldisa tara Millen in Millen & Gosliner, 1985
- Aldisa theveneti Á. Valdés, Stout & M. Kim, 2022
- Aldisa trentinae Á. Valdés, Stout & M. Kim, 2022
- Aldisa trimaculata Gosliner in Millen & Gosliner, 1985
- Aldisa vozinhai Ortea, 2026
- Aldisa williamsi Elwood, Valdes & Gosliner, 2000
- Aldisa zavorensis Tibiriçá, Pola & Cervera, 2017
- Aldisa zetlandica (Alder & Hancock, 1854)

=== Synonyms ===
- Aldisa berghi Vayssière, 1901: synonym of Doris ocelligera (Bergh, 1881)
- Aldisa nhatrangensis is a synonym of: Actinocyclus verrucosus
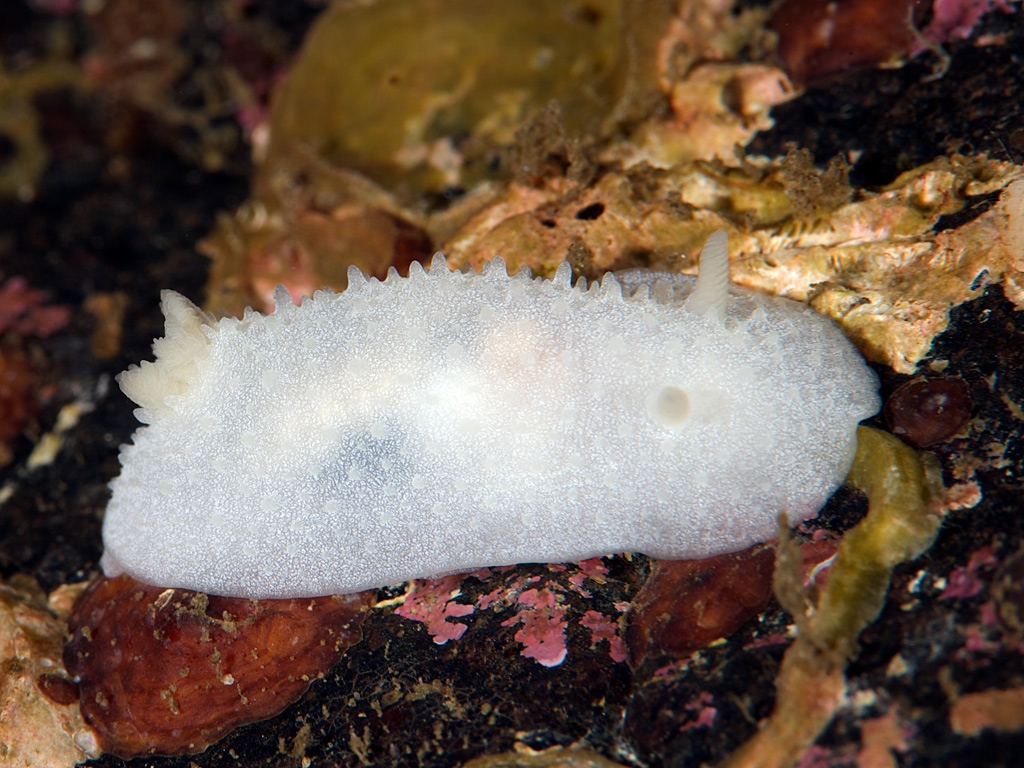
Aldisa zetlandica

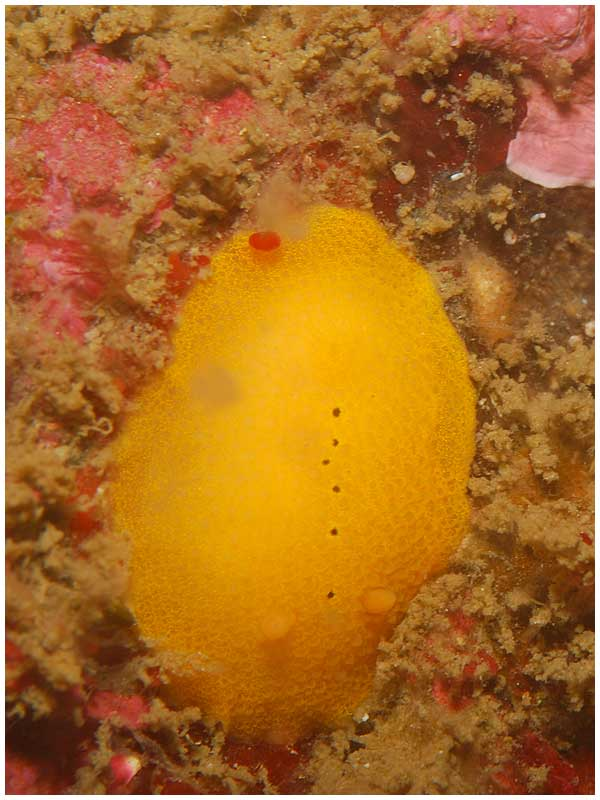
Aldisa cooperi

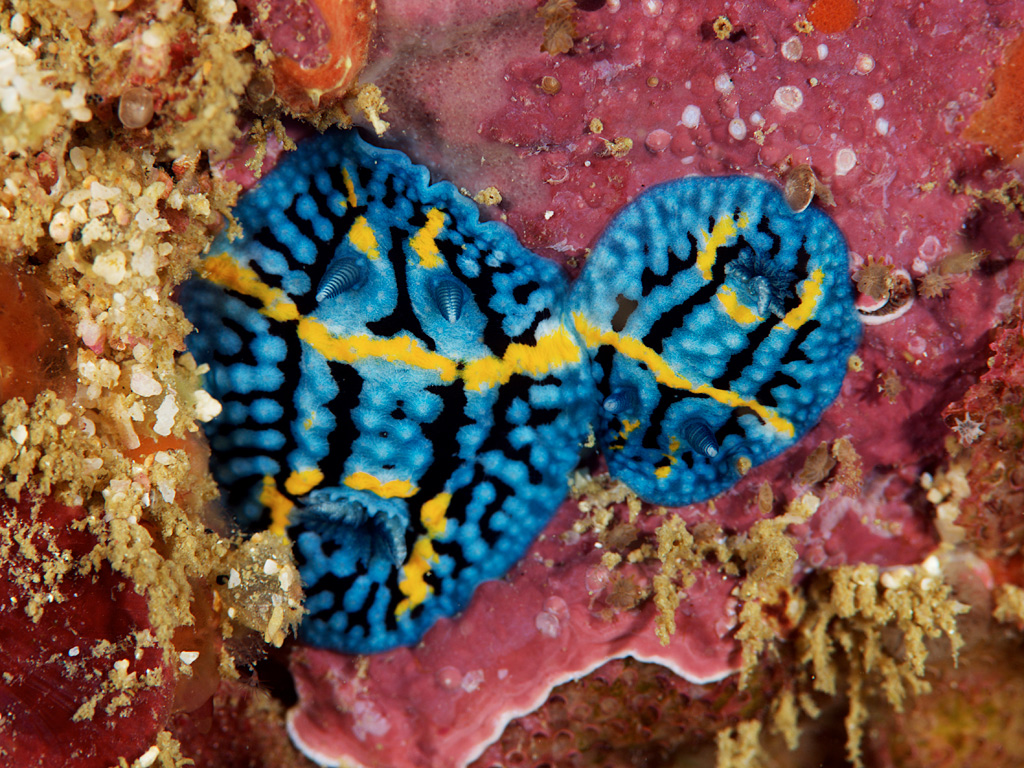
Aldisa andersoni

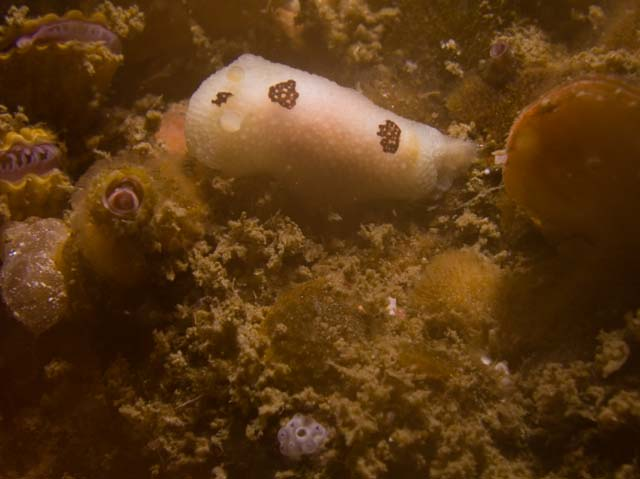
Aldisa trimaculata
