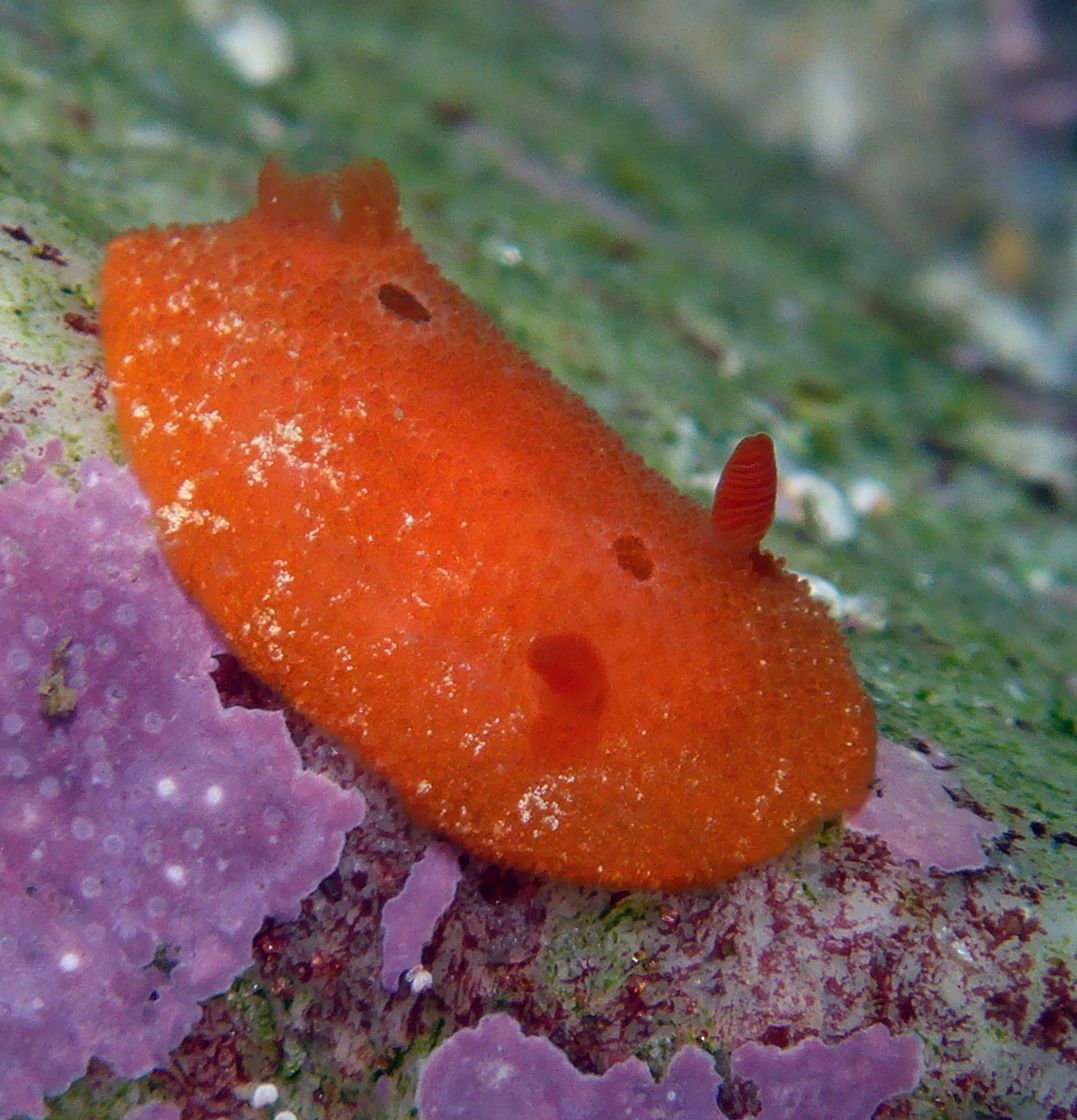
- Aldisa sanguinea from Point Pinos, California

Scientific classification
- Kingdom: Animalia
- Phylum: Mollusca
- Class: Gastropoda
- Order: Nudibranchia
- Family: Cadlinidae
- Genus: Aldisa
- Species: A. sanguinea

Binomial name
- Aldisa sanguinea (J. G. Cooper, 1863)

= Aldisa sanguinea =

Blood-spot dorid

Species of gastropod

Aldisa sanguinea, common name the blood-spot dorid, is a species of sea slug, a dorid nudibranch, a marine gastropod mollusk in the family Cadlinidae.

== Distribution ==
This species was described from California. It has subsequently been recorded on the western seaboard of North America from British Columbia south to Mexico. In the north of this range, in Oregon and British Columbia, specimens are found which lack the two characteristic round markings on the back resembling the inhalant pore sieves of Hymedesmiid sponges. It is possible that these belong to a separate species.

== Ecology ==
This species feeds on a red Hymedesmia sponge.
