= Hymedesmia barnesi =

Scientific classification
- Kingdom: Animalia
- Phylum: Porifera
- Class: Demospongiae
- Order: Poecilosclerida
- Family: Hymedesmiidae
- Genus: Hymedesmia
- Species: H. barnesi

Binomial name
- Hymedesmia barnesi Goodwin, Brewin & Brickle, 2012

Species of sponge

Hymedesmia barnesi is a species of demosponge first found on the coast of South Georgia island, in the south west Southern Ocean.
