= Aldisa tara =

Scientific classification
- Kingdom: Animalia
- Phylum: Mollusca
- Class: Gastropoda
- Order: Nudibranchia
- Family: Cadlinidae
- Genus: Aldisa
- Species: A. tara

Binomial name
- Aldisa tara Millen, 1984

Species of gastropod

Aldisa tara, also known as King's Aldisa, is a species of sea slug, a dorid nudibranch, a marine gastropod mollusk in the family Cadlinidae.

== Distribution ==
This species was described from British Columbia, Canada.

== Ecology ==
Aldisa tara feeds on a red Hymedesmiid sponge, a Hamigera sp.

== Etymology ==
The name tara refers to the Hill of Tara, the mythological seat of the high-kings of Ireland.
