= Aldisa alabastrina =

Scientific classification
- Kingdom: Animalia
- Phylum: Mollusca
- Class: Gastropoda
- Order: Nudibranchia
- Family: Cadlinidae
- Genus: Aldisa
- Species: A. alabastrina

Binomial name
- Aldisa alabastrina (Cooper, 1863)

Synonyms
- Doris (Asteronotus) alabastrina Cooper, 1863

Species of gastropod

Aldisa alabastrina is a species of sea slug, a dorid nudibranch, a marine gastropod mollusc in the family Cadlinidae.

== Distribution ==
This species was described from under stones on the shore at San Diego Bay, California, United States.
