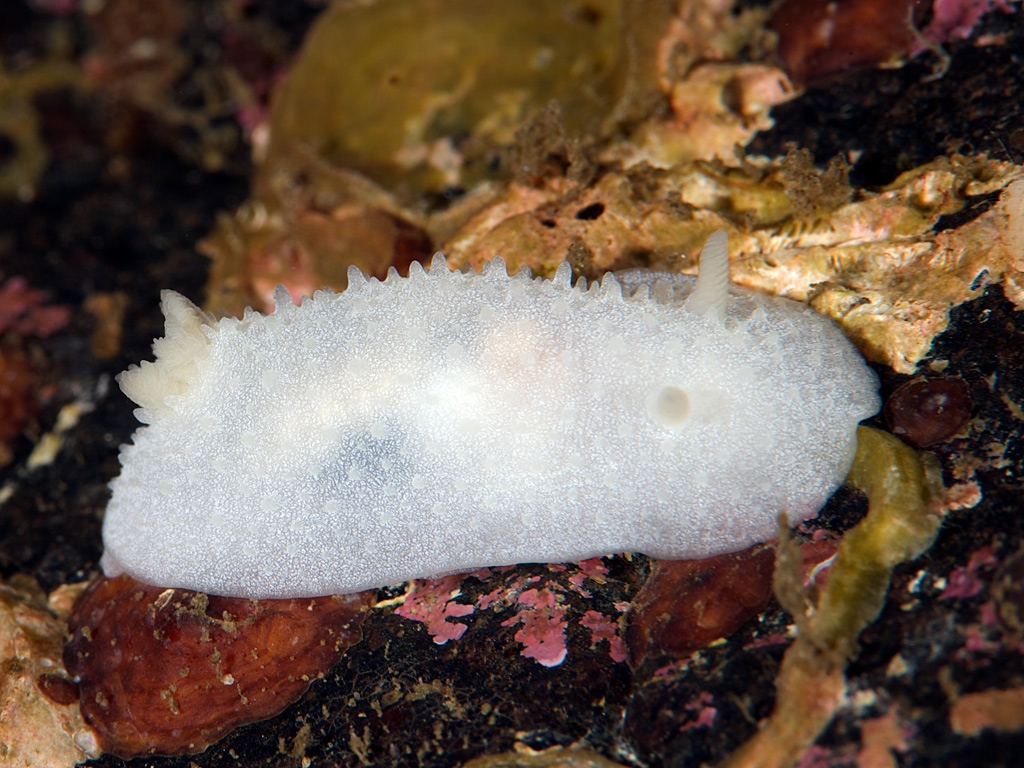
- Aldisa zetlandica (head end towards the right) at Gulen Dive Resort, Nyborg, Norway.

Scientific classification
- Kingdom: Animalia
- Phylum: Mollusca
- Class: Gastropoda
- Order: Nudibranchia
- Family: Cadlinidae
- Genus: Aldisa
- Species: A. zetlandica

Binomial name
- Aldisa zetlandica (Alder & Hancock, 1854)

Synonyms
- Doris zetlandica Alder & Hancock, 1854

= Aldisa zetlandica =

Species of gastropod

Aldisa zetlandica is a species of sea slug, a dorid nudibranch, a marine gastropod mollusc in the family Cadlinidae.

== Distribution ==
This species was described from Shetland, United Kingdom. It has subsequently been reported from Ireland, Norway, Sweden, Iceland and the Azores.
