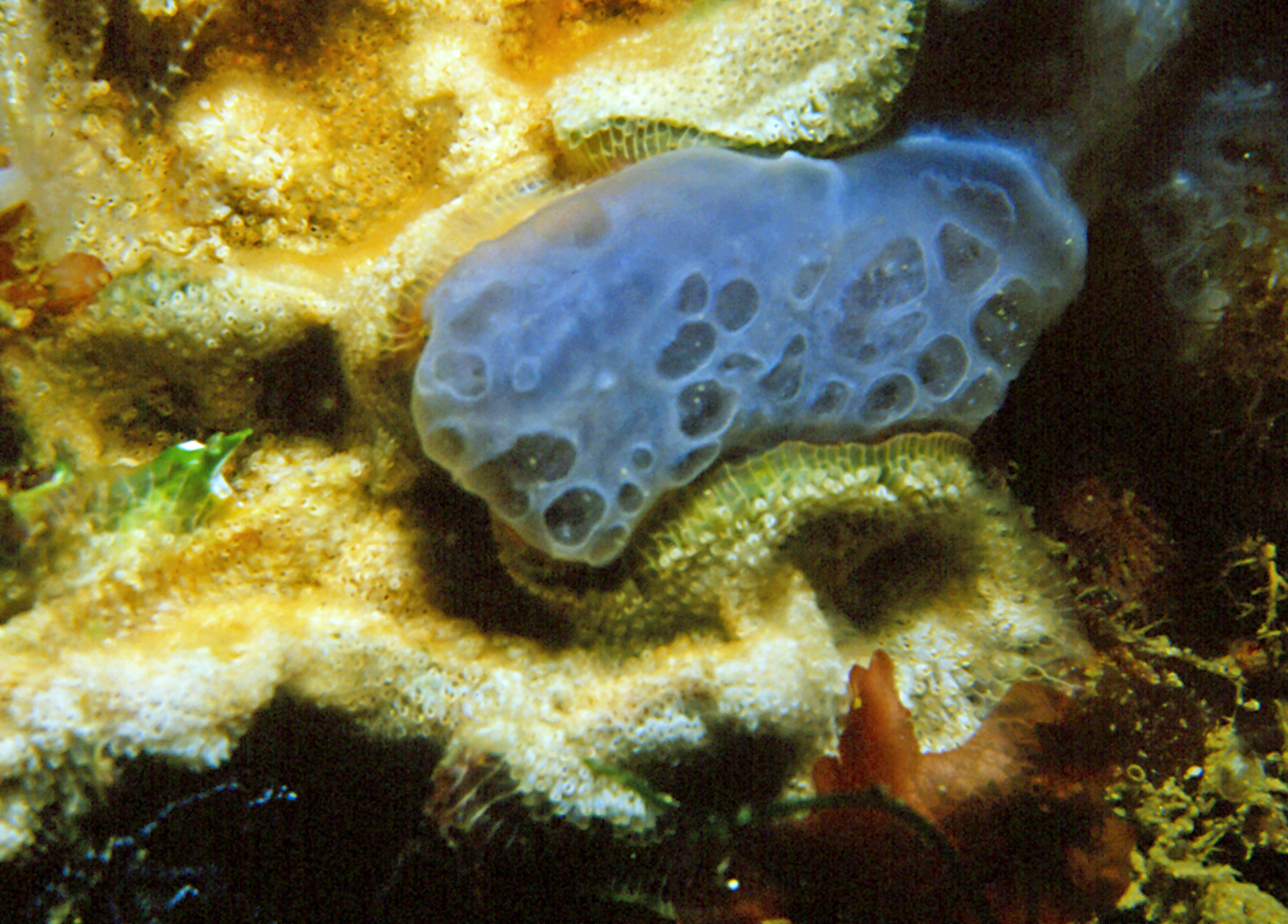
- Phorbas tenacior

Scientific classification
- Kingdom: Animalia
- Phylum: Porifera
- Class: Demospongiae
- Order: Poecilosclerida
- Family: Hymedesmiidae
- Genus: Phorbas; Duchassaing & Michelotti, 1864

Species
- See text

Synonyms
- Anchinoe (Gray, 1867); Bipocillopsis (Koltun, 1964); Clathrissa (Lendenfeld, 1888); Grayax (Laubenfels, 1936); Lissopocillon (Ferrer-Hernandez, 1916); Merriamium (Laubenfels, 1936); Plumohalichondria (Carter, 1876); Podotuberculum (Bakus, 1966); Pronax sensu (Gray, 1867); Pronaxella (Burton, 1931'); Stylostichon (Topsent, 1892); Suberotelites (Schmidt, 1868)

= Phorbas (sponge) =

Genus of sponges

Phorbas is a genus of demosponges belonging to the family Hymedesmiidae. The chemical Muironolide A was extracted from a species in this genus.

== Species ==
The following species are recognised:

- Phorbas acanthochela (Koltun, 1964)
- Phorbas amaranthus (Duchassaing & Michelotti, 1864)
- Phorbas arborescens (Ridley, 1884)
- Phorbas arbuscula (Lendenfeld, 1888)
- Phorbas areolatus (Thiele, 1905)
- Phorbas armatus (Schmidt, 1868)
- Phorbas aurantiacus (Rützler, Piantoni, Van Soest & Diaz, 2014)
- Phorbas baffini (Brøndsted, 1933)
- Phorbas bardajii (Uriz, 1988)
- Phorbas benguelensis (Uriz, 1984)
- Phorbas bergmontae (Hajdu & Teixeira, 2011)
- Phorbas bihamiger (Waller, 1878)
- Phorbas burtoni (Hajdu & Teixeira, 2011)
- Phorbas caespitosus (Carter, 1885)
- Phorbas californianus (Laubenfels, 1932)
- Phorbas capixaba (Hajdu & Teixeira, 2011)
- Phorbas clathratus (Lévi, 1963)
- Phorbas clathrodes (Dendy, 1922)
- Phorbas claviger (Levinsen, 1887)
- Phorbas dayi (Lévi, 1963)
- Phorbas demonstrans (Topsent, 1890)
- Phorbas dendyi (Topsent, 1890)
- Phorbas dives (Topsent, 1891)
- Phorbas domini (Boury-Esnault & van Beveren, 1982)
- Phorbas epizoaria (Lévi, 1958)
- Phorbas equiosculatus (Pansini, 1987)
- Phorbas erectus (Lévi, 1993)
- Phorbas ferrerhernandezi (van Soest, 2002)
- Phorbas ferrugineus (Goodwin, Jones, Neely & Brickle, 2011)
- Phorbas fibrosus (Lévi, 1963)
- Phorbas fibulatus (Topsent, 1893)
- Phorbas fictitioides (Dendy & Frederick, 1924)
- Phorbas fictitius (Bowerbank, 1866)
- Phorbas frutex Pulitzer-Finali, 1993
- Phorbas fulvus (Bergquist & Fromont, 1988)
- Phorbas fusifer (Ridley & Dendy, 1887)
- Phorbas glaberrimus (Topsent, 1916)
- Phorbas gravidus (Dendy, 1896)
- Phorbas gukhulensis (Sim & Kim, 2004)
- Phorbas hechteli (Hajdu & Teixeira, 2011)
- Phorbas hoffmani (Bakus, 1966)
- Phorbas intermedius Bergquist, 1961
- Phorbas kovdaicum (Rezvoi, 1925)
- Phorbas lamellatus (Lévi, 1963)
- Phorbas lieberkuehni (Burton, 1930)
- Phorbas longurioides (Burton, 1932)
- Phorbas megasigma Rios & Cristobo, 2007
- Phorbas mercator (Schmidt, 1868)
- Phorbas microchelifer (Cabioch, 1968)
- Phorbas mollis (Kirkpatrick, 1903)
- Phorbas nexus (Koltun, 1964)
- Phorbas osculosus (Topsent, 1892)
- Phorbas palmatus Pulitzer-Finali, 1993
- Phorbas papillatus (Dendy, 1922)
- Phorbas papillosus (Arnesen, 1903)
- Phorbas paucistylifer (Koltun, 1958)
- Phorbas perarmatus (Bowerbank, 1866)
- Phorbas plumosus (Montagu, 1814)
- Phorbas posidoni (Voultsiadou-Koukoura & van Soest, 1991)
- Phorbas punctatus (Picton & Goodwin, 2007)
- Phorbas purpureus (Carter, 1886)
- Phorbas pustulosus (Carter, 1882), Baseball glove sponge
- Phorbas ramosus (Lendenfeld, 1888)
- Phorbas reginae (Aguilar-Camacho & Carballo, 2012)
- Phorbas repens (Topsent, 1904)
- Phorbas roemeri (Hentschel, 1929)
- Phorbas roxasi (de Laubenfels, 1935)
- Phorbas salebrosus (Koltun, 1958)
- Phorbas scabida (sensu Vacelet, Vasseur & Lévi, 1976)
- Phorbas shackletoni (Goodwin, Jones, Neely & Brickle, 2011)
- Phorbas styliferus (Burton, 1959)
- Phorbas tailliezi (Vacelet & Pérez, 2008)
- Phorbas tanitai (Hajdu & Teixeira, 2011)
- Phorbas tenacior (Topsent, 1925)
- Phorbas tenuis (Cuartas, 1992)
- Phorbas tenuispiculatus (Dendy, 1896)
- Phorbas thela (Vosmaer, 1880)
- Phorbas tokushima (Tanita, 1970)
- Phorbas topsenti (Vacelet & Pérez, 2008)
- Phorbas uncifer (Dendy, 1896)
- Phorbas viecquensis (Duchassaing & Michelotti, 1864)
