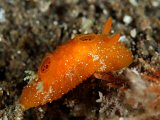

Scientific classification
- Kingdom: Animalia
- Phylum: Mollusca
- Class: Gastropoda
- Order: Nudibranchia
- Family: Cadlinidae
- Genus: Aldisa
- Species: A. pikokai

Binomial name
- Aldisa pikokai Bertsch & Johnson, 1982

= Aldisa pikokai =

Species of gastropod

Aldisa pikokai is a species of sea slug, a dorid nudibranch, a marine gastropod mollusk in the family Cadlinidae.

== Distribution ==
This species was described from Hawaii. It has subsequently been reported from the Marshall Islands.
