= Aldisa binotata =

Scientific classification
- Kingdom: Animalia
- Phylum: Mollusca
- Class: Gastropoda
- Order: Nudibranchia
- Family: Cadlinidae
- Genus: Aldisa
- Species: A. binotata

Binomial name
- Aldisa binotata Pruvot-Fol, 1953

Species of gastropod

Aldisa binotata is a species of sea slug, a dorid nudibranch, a marine gastropod mollusk in the family Cadlinidae.

== Distribution ==
This species was described from Fédala, Morocco, 33°41′24.0″N 7°23′24.0″W.
