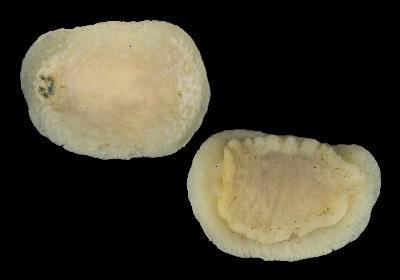
- Body of Aldisa expleta (holotype in the MNHN, Paris)

Scientific classification
- Kingdom: Animalia
- Phylum: Mollusca
- Class: Gastropoda
- Order: Nudibranchia
- Family: Cadlinidae
- Genus: Aldisa
- Species: A. expleta

Binomial name
- Aldisa expleta Ortea, Pérez & Llera, 1982

= Aldisa expleta =

Species of gastropod

Aldisa expleta is a species of sea slug, a dorid nudibranch, a marine gastropod mollusk in the family Cadlinidae.

== Distribution ==
The marine species occurs off the Canary Islands.
