= Aldisa albomarginata =

Scientific classification
- Kingdom: Animalia
- Phylum: Mollusca
- Class: Gastropoda
- Order: Nudibranchia
- Family: Cadlinidae
- Genus: Aldisa
- Species: A. albomarginata

Binomial name
- Aldisa albomarginata Millen, 1984

Species of gastropod

Aldisa albomarginata is a species of sea slug, a dorid nudibranch, a marine gastropod mollusk in the family Cadlinidae.

== Distribution ==
This species was described from two specimens found at 7 m and 10 m depth at Earls Cove, British Columbia, Canada 49°45′N 124°01′W. It is known from Vancouver, British Columbia, Canada south to San Diego, southern California, USA.
