= Aldisa trentinae =

Scientific classification
- Kingdom: Animalia
- Phylum: Mollusca
- Class: Gastropoda
- Order: Nudibranchia
- Family: Cadlinidae
- Genus: Aldisa
- Species: A. trentinae

Binomial name
- Aldisa trentinae Á. Valdés, Stout & M. Kim, 2022

Species of gastropod

Aldisa trentinae is a species of sea slug, a dorid nudibranch, a marine gastropod mollusk in the family Cadlinidae.

== Distribution ==
The marine species occurs off Réunion.
