= Aldisa puntallanensis =

Scientific classification
- Kingdom: Animalia
- Phylum: Mollusca
- Class: Gastropoda
- Order: Nudibranchia
- Family: Cadlinidae
- Genus: Aldisa
- Species: A. puntallanensis

Binomial name
- Aldisa puntallanensis Moro & Ortea, 2011

Species of gastropod

Aldisa puntallanensis is a species of sea slug or dorid nudibranch, a marine gastropod mollusk in the family Cadlinidae.

== Distribution ==
This species was described from La Gomera in the Canary Islands.
