= Aldisa theveneti =

Scientific classification
- Kingdom: Animalia
- Phylum: Mollusca
- Class: Gastropoda
- Order: Nudibranchia
- Family: Cadlinidae
- Genus: Aldisa
- Species: A. theveneti

Binomial name
- Aldisa theveneti Á. Valdés, Stout & M. Kim, 2022

Species of gastropod

Aldisa theveneti is a species of sea slug, a dorid nudibranch, a marine gastropod mollusk in the family Cadlinidae.

== Distribution ==
The marine species occurs off New Caledonia.
