= Muironolide A =

Names
- IUPAC name (1S,2E,4R,7R,11S,14E,16R,17R)-11-[(1S,2R)-2-chlorocyclopropyl]-2,4,17-trimethyl-7-(trichloromethyl)-8,12-dioxa-19-azatricyclo[14.7.0.017,21]tricosa-2,14,21-triene-9,13,20-trione

Identifiers
CAS Number	1160939-11-6
3D model (JSmol)	Interactive image; Interactive image
ChemSpider	27024092
PubChem CID	165365497
CompTox Dashboard (EPA)	DTXSID301043854
- InChI: InChI=1S/C27H33Cl4NO5/c1-14-4-8-22(27(29,30)31)37-24(34)12-21(17-11-20(17)28)36-23(33)9-7-18-16(15(2)10-14)5-6-19-25(35)32-13-26(18,19)3/h6-7,9-10,14,16-18,20-22H,4-5,8,11-13H2,1-3H3,(H,32,35)/b9-7+,15-10+/t14-,16-,17?,18-,20-,21+,22-,26-/m1/s1 Key: DVSMDAZIABCDQH-XRDZMDRSSA-N; InChI=1S/C27H33Cl4NO5/c1-14-4-8-22(27(29,30)31)37-24(34)12-21(17-11-20(17)28)36-23(33)9-7-18-16(15(2)10-14)5-6-19-25(35)32-13-26(18,19)3/h6-7,9-10,14,16-18,20-22H,4-5,8,11-13H2,1-3H3,(H,32,35)/b9-7+,15-10+/t14-,16-,17-,18-,20-,21+,22-,26-/m1/s1 Key: DVSMDAZIABCDQH-DULMNHEISA-N
- SMILES: C[C@@H]\1CC[C@@H](OC(=O)C[C@H](OC(=O)/C=C/[C@@H]2[C@H](CC=C3[C@@]2(CNC3=O)C)/C(=C1)/C)C4C[C@H]4Cl)C(Cl)(Cl)Cl; C[C@@H]\1CC[C@@H](OC(=O)C[C@H](OC(=O)/C=C/[C@@H]2[C@H](CC=C3[C@@]2(CNC3=O)C)/C(=C1)/C)[C@@H]4C[C@H]4Cl)C(Cl)(Cl)Cl

Properties
Chemical formula	C_{27}H_{33}Cl_{4}NO_{5}
Molar mass	593.36 g·mol^{−1}
- Except where otherwise noted, data are given for materials in their standard state (at 25 °C [77 °F], 100 kPa). Infobox references

Muironolide A is a tetrachloro polyketide discovered in 200 that has two unusual structural details: a hexahydro-1H-isoindolone-triketide ring and a trichlorocarbinol ester. It is suspected that it is the product of a sponge–microorganism (cyanobacteria) association. It was isolated from the marine sponge Phorbas sp.

== Biosynthesis and synthesis ==
Muironolide A possibly has its biosynthetic route coming from PKS 1 responsible for forming the lactonic ring, with an amino acid residue, which forms the isoindole ring present in the molecule and successive enzymatic transformations of reduction, oxidation, cyclication, denaturation and additions of halogens ( Chlorine - Cl) result in the final molecule.

There are proposals for synthetic routes that elucidate the synthesis process. In 2015, Xiao and collaborators carried out the synthesis and structural revision of muironolide A molecules.

== Biological activities ==
Muironolide A has already been tested for antineoplastic activity in 56 different models using different cell lines and did not provide biological activity in any of them. Phorbas sp. also produces the macrolides phorboxazoles A and B and phorbaside A, which do have antifungal and cytostatic activity.
