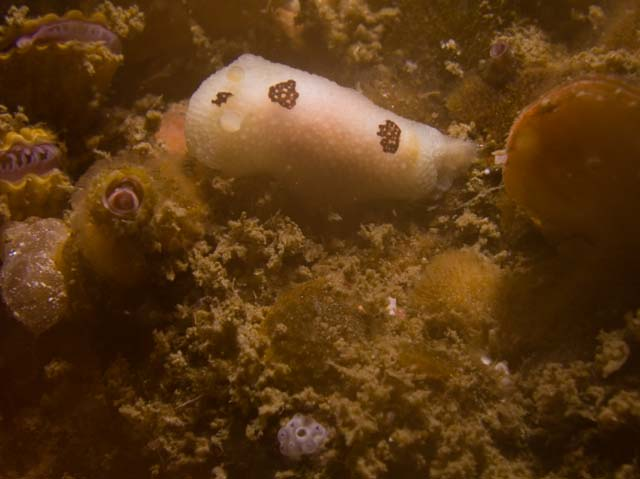

Scientific classification
- Kingdom: Animalia
- Phylum: Mollusca
- Class: Gastropoda
- Order: Nudibranchia
- Family: Cadlinidae
- Genus: Aldisa
- Species: A. trimaculata

Binomial name
- Aldisa trimaculata Gosliner in Millen & Gosliner, 1985

= Three-spot nudibranch =

Species of gastropod

The three-spot nudibranch, scientific name Aldisa trimaculata, is a species of sea slug, a dorid nudibranch, a marine gastropod mollusc in the family Cadlinidae.

== Distribution ==
This demersal species has so far only been found around the southern African coast, on both sides of the Cape Peninsula, in 10–30 m of water. It may possibly be endemic to that area.

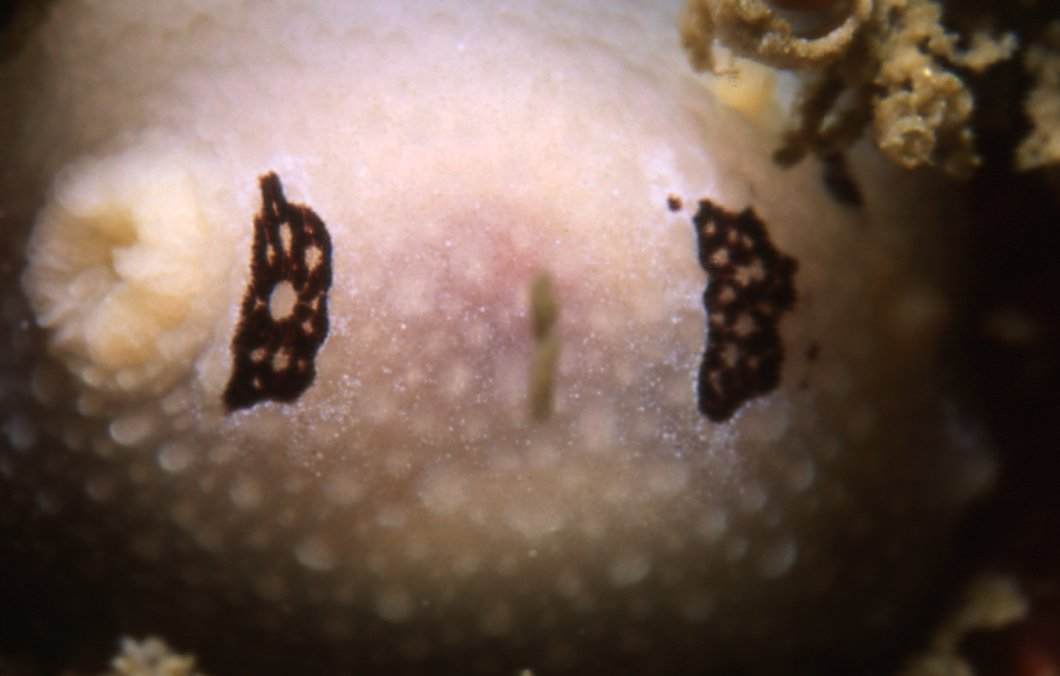
Two of the dotted spots of the three-spot nudibranch

== Description ==
The three-spot nudibranch is a tan-coloured dorid with a warty skin and three brown spots, which are themselves spotted with lighter patches. The animal has eight gills arranged around the anus and its rhinophores are perfoliate. It may reach a total length of 40 mm.

== Ecology ==
This species feeds on sponges.
