= Aldisa zavorensis =

Scientific classification
- Kingdom: Animalia
- Phylum: Mollusca
- Class: Gastropoda
- Order: Nudibranchia
- Suborder: Doridina
- Infraorder: Doridoidei
- Superfamily: Doridoidea
- Family: Cadlinidae
- Genus: Aldisa
- Species: A. zavorensis

Binomial name
- Aldisa zavorensis Tibiriçá, Pola & Cervera, 2017

Species of gastropod

Aldisa zavorensis is a species of sea snail, a marine gastropod mollusk, in the family Cadlinidae.

== Distribution ==
This species occurs in Mozambique.
