= Aldisa barlettai =

Scientific classification
- Kingdom: Animalia
- Phylum: Mollusca
- Class: Gastropoda
- Order: Nudibranchia
- Family: Cadlinidae
- Genus: Aldisa
- Species: A. barlettai

Binomial name
- Aldisa barlettai Ortea & Ballesteros, 1989

Species of mollusc

Aldisa barlettai is a species of sea slug, a dorid nudibranch, a marine gastropod mollusk in the family Cadlinidae.

== Distribution ==
This species was described from the Cape Verde Islands.
