= Aldisa benguelae =

Scientific classification
- Kingdom: Animalia
- Phylum: Mollusca
- Class: Gastropoda
- Order: Nudibranchia
- Family: Cadlinidae
- Genus: Aldisa
- Species: A. benguelae

Binomial name
- Aldisa benguelae Gosliner in Millen & Gosliner, 1985

Species of gastropod

Aldisa benguelae is a species of sea slug, a dorid nudibranch, a marine gastropod mollusk in the family Cadlinidae.

== Distribution ==
The holotype of this species was collected at Bakoven, South Africa, 33°57′S 18°24′E, at 20 m depth. A paratype was collected at Hottentot’s Huissie, South Africa, 33°59′S 18°21′E, 20 m depth.
