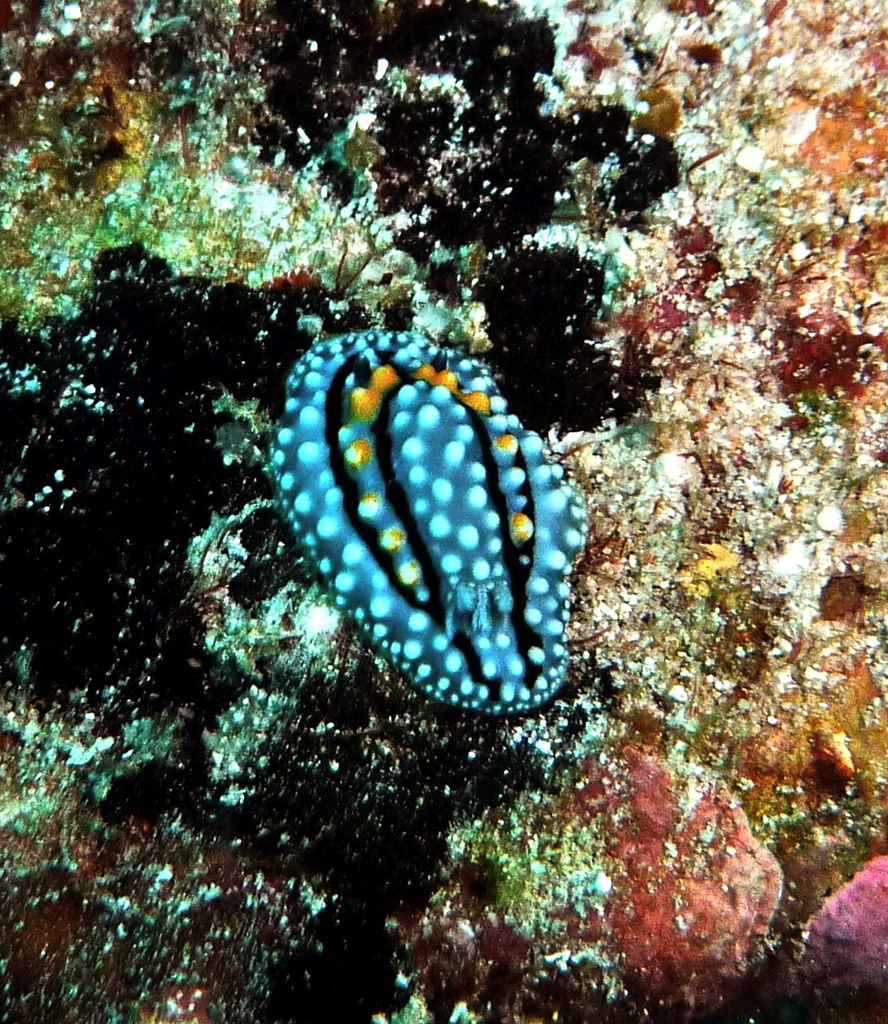

Scientific classification
- Kingdom: Animalia
- Phylum: Mollusca
- Class: Gastropoda
- Order: Nudibranchia
- Family: Cadlinidae
- Genus: Aldisa
- Species: A. erwinkoehleri

Binomial name
- Aldisa erwinkoehleri Perrone, 2001

= Aldisa erwinkoehleri =

Species of gastropod

Aldisa erwinkoehleri is a species of sea slugs, a dorid nudibranch, a marine gastropod mollusc in the family Cadlinidae.

== Distribution ==
This species was described from Thailand. It has been reported from several locations in the Andaman Sea and Similan Islands.
