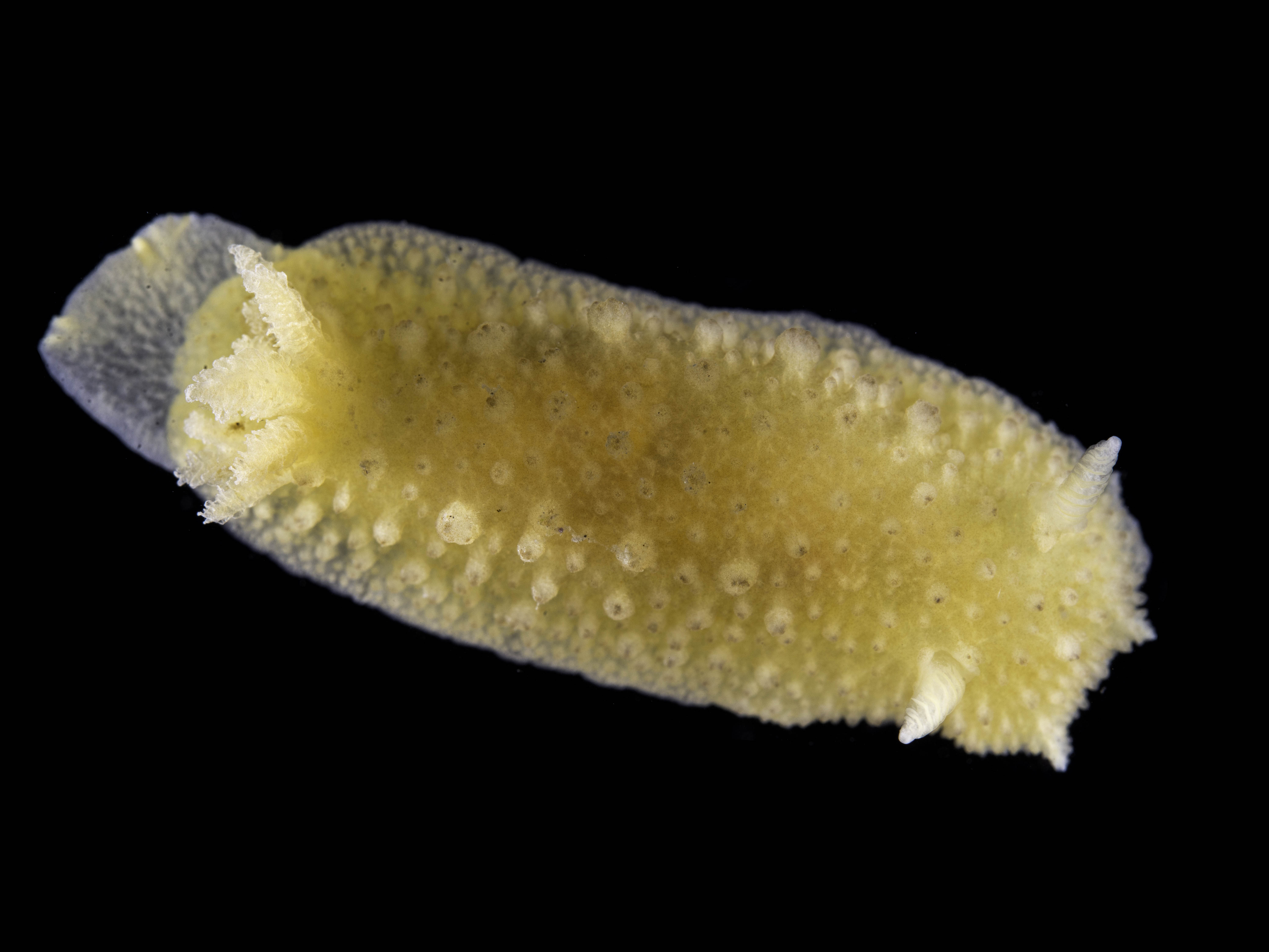
- Doris ocelligera, Killary Harbour, Ireland.

Scientific classification
- Kingdom: Animalia
- Phylum: Mollusca
- Class: Gastropoda
- Order: Nudibranchia
- Family: Dorididae
- Genus: Doris
- Species: D. ocelligera

Binomial name
- Doris ocelligera (Bergh, 1881)

Synonyms
- Aldisa berghi Vayssière, 1901; Staurodoris ocelligera Bergh, 1881 (original combination)

= Doris ocelligera =

Species of gastropod

Doris ocelligera is a species of sea slug, a dorid nudibranch, a marine gastropod mollusk in the family Dorididae.

== Distribution ==
This species occurs in the Mediterranean Sea and in the Atlantic Ocean off the Cape Verdes, the Azores, the Canary Islands, France, the United Kingdom, and Ireland.
