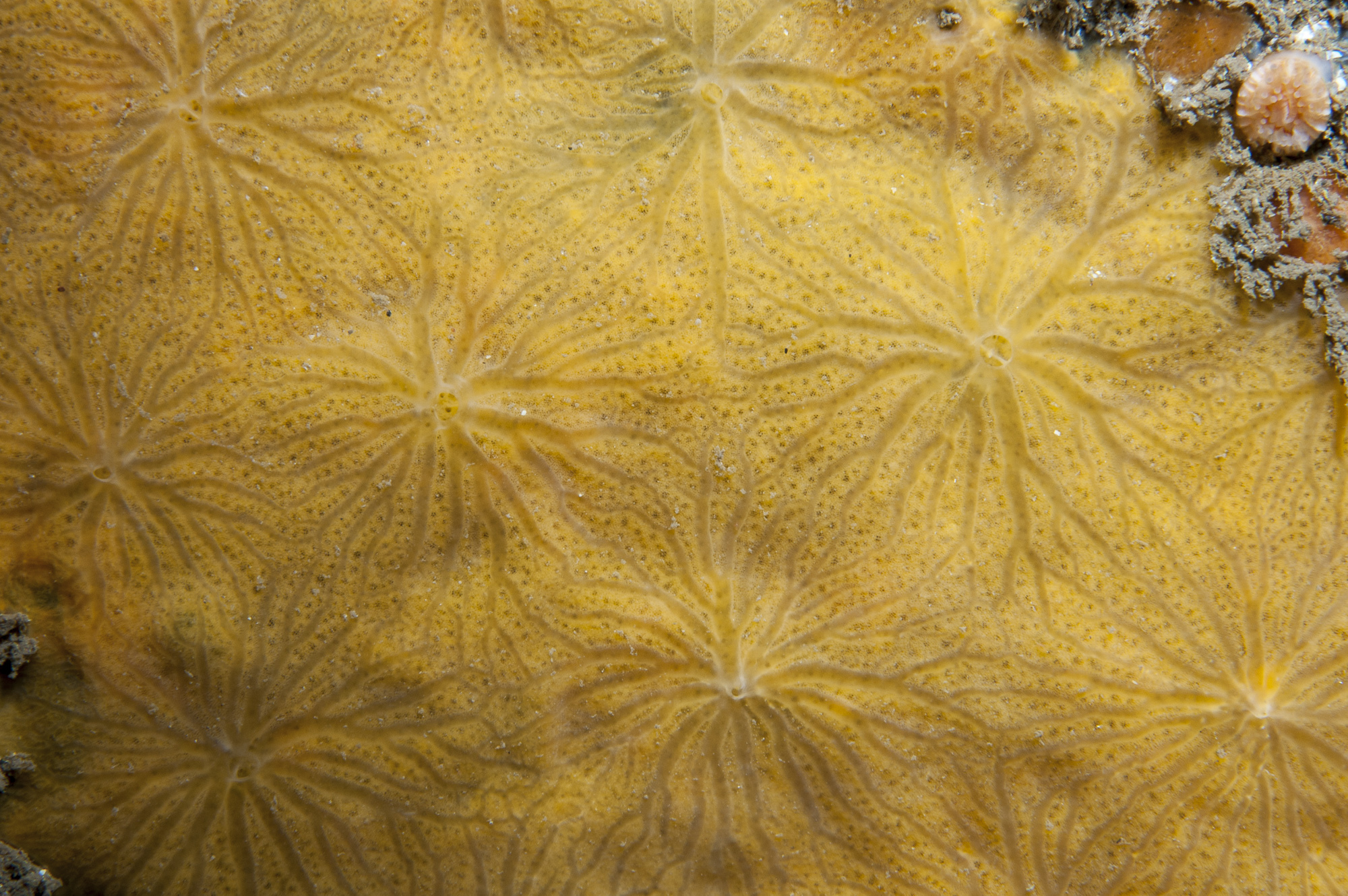
- Hymedesmia stellifera

Scientific classification
- Kingdom: Animalia
- Phylum: Porifera
- Class: Demospongiae
- Order: Poecilosclerida
- Family: Hymedesmiidae
- Genus: Hymedesmia; Bowerbank, 1864

Type species
- Hymedesmia zetlandica Bowerbank, 1864

Synonyms
- Ectyodesma Topsent, 1928; Ectyodesmia Topsent, 1928; Ectyostylopus Topsent, 1928; Holorodesmia Topsent, 1928; Hymenodesmia Filhol, 1885; Hymetrichita Pulitzer-Finali, 1983; Hymidesmia Bowerbank, 1874; Hymoxenia Alander, 1937; Leptosia Topsent, 1892; Poecilochela de Laubenfels, 1936; Sclerilla Schmidt, 1868; Stegxella Bowerbank, 1874

= Hymedesmia =

Genus of sponges

Hymedesmia is a genus of sponges belonging to the family Hymedesmiidae. The genus is divided into two subgenera, Hymedesmia (Hymedesmia) for species with microscleres, usually chelae, and Hymedesmia (Stylopus) for species lacking microscleres and having only acanthostyles and smooth spicules which are described as tylotes, tornotes or oxea, but are clearly homologous. This distinction is probably artificial and the genus is in need of revision.

The genus has a cosmopolitan distribution.

== Species ==
The following species are recognised in the genus Hymedesmia:

Subgenus Hymedesmia

- Hymedesmia agariciicola van Soest, 1984
- Hymedesmia anatoliensis Gözcelíoglu, Van Soest, Alvarez & Konuklugíl, 2015
- Hymedesmia anisostrongyloxea Bergquist & Fromont, 1988
- Hymedesmia antarctica Hentschel, 1914
- Hymedesmia anvilensis Ott, McDaniel & Humphrey, 2024
- Hymedesmia armigera (Bowerbank, 1882)
- Hymedesmia atlantica Topsent, 1928
- Hymedesmia aurantiaca Lévi, 1963
- Hymedesmia baculifera (Topsent, 1901)
- Hymedesmia barnesi Goodwin, Brewin & Brickle, 2012
- Hymedesmia basiclavata Topsent, 1928
- Hymedesmia basispinosa Lundbeck, 1910
- Hymedesmia bocki Alander, 1942
- Hymedesmia bonairensis van Soest, 2009
- Hymedesmia bowerbanki Lundbeck, 1910
- Hymedesmia brachyrhabda Lévi & Lévi, 1983
- Hymedesmia bractea Lundbeck, 1910
- Hymedesmia canadensis Ginn, Logan, Thomas & van Soest, 1998
- Hymedesmia caribica Lehnert & van Soest, 1996
- Hymedesmia castanea Sarà, 1964
- Hymedesmia chlorosa Alander, 1942
- Hymedesmia clavigera Lundbeck, 1910
- Hymedesmia cohesibacilla Goodwin & Picton, 2009
- Hymedesmia consanguinea Lundbeck, 1910
- Hymedesmia cordichela Alander, 1942
- Hymedesmia costata Topsent, 1928
- Hymedesmia cratera Goodwin & Picton, 2009
- Hymedesmia crelloides Burton & Rao, 1932
- Hymedesmia croftsae Goodwin, Jones, Neely & Brickle, 2016
- Hymedesmia crux (Schmidt, 1875)
- Hymedesmia cultrisigma Lundbeck, 1910
- Hymedesmia curacaoensis van Soest, 1984
- Hymedesmia curvichela Lundbeck, 1910
- Hymedesmia decepta (Kirkpatrick, 1907)
- Hymedesmia depressa Topsent, 1928
- Hymedesmia dichela (Hentschel, 1911)
- Hymedesmia digitata Lundbeck, 1910
- Hymedesmia donsi Alander, 1937
- Hymedesmia dubia Lundbeck, 1910
- Hymedesmia ebria Alander, 1937
- Hymedesmia filans (Schmidt, 1868)
- Hymedesmia filifera (Schmidt, 1875)
- Hymedesmia flaccida Topsent, 1928
- Hymedesmia gaussiana Hentschel, 1914
- Hymedesmia gibbosa Goodwin, Picton & van Soest, 2011
- Hymedesmia gisleni Alander, 1942
- Hymedesmia gracilisigma Topsent, 1928
- Hymedesmia grandis Lundbeck, 1910
- Hymedesmia gregalis Koltun, 1970
- Hymedesmia gunhildae Alander, 1942
- Hymedesmia gustafsoni Alander, 1942
- Hymedesmia hallmanni Topsent, 1928
- Hymedesmia helgae Stephens, 1916
- Hymedesmia humboldti Salani, Willenz, Fernandez & Hajdu, 2022
- Hymedesmia inflata (Alander, 1937)
- Hymedesmia irregularis Lundbeck, 1910
- Hymedesmia jamaicensis van Soest, 1984
- Hymedesmia jeanvaceleti Van Soest & Hooper, 2020
- Hymedesmia jecusculum (Bowerbank, 1866)
- Hymedesmia jugalis Topsent, 1928
- Hymedesmia koehleri (Topsent, 1896)
- Hymedesmia lacera Lundbeck, 1910
- Hymedesmia laevistylus Lundbeck, 1910
- Hymedesmia lamina Lundbeck, 1910
- Hymedesmia lancifera (Topsent, 1906)
- Hymedesmia laptikhovskyi Goodwin, Jones, Neely & Brickle, 2016
- Hymedesmia latrunculioides Lundbeck, 1910
- Hymedesmia lenta Descatoire, 1966
- Hymedesmia leptochela Hentschel, 1914
- Hymedesmia levis Lundbeck, 1910
- Hymedesmia lindstroemae Cárdenas & Thollesson, 2016
- Hymedesmia lobichela Topsent, 1928
- Hymedesmia longistylus Lundbeck, 1910
- Hymedesmia lundbecki Dendy, 1924
- Hymedesmia macrosigma Lundbeck, 1910
- Hymedesmia mamillaris (Fristedt, 1885)
- Hymedesmia mannarensis Thomas, 1970
- Hymedesmia manubriata (Topsent, 1928)
- Hymedesmia mariondufresni Boury-Esnault & van Beveren, 1982
- Hymedesmia matthesi Arndt, 1941
- Hymedesmia mertoni Hentschel, 1912
- Hymedesmia microchela Alander, 1942
- Hymedesmia microstrongyla Bergquist & Fromont, 1988
- Hymedesmia minuta Alander, 1935
- Hymedesmia mollis Lundbeck, 1910
- Hymedesmia mucronata (Topsent, 1904)
- Hymedesmia murrayi Burton, 1959
- Hymedesmia mutabilis (Topsent, 1904)
- Hymedesmia noramaloneae Goodwin, Berman & Hendry, 2019
- Hymedesmia norvegica Thiele, 1903
- Hymedesmia nummota Laubenfels, 1936
- Hymedesmia nummulus Lundbeck, 1910
- Hymedesmia occulta Bowerbank in Norman, 1869
- Hymedesmia omissa Topsent, 1938
- Hymedesmia orientalis Koltun, 1962
- Hymedesmia oxneri Topsent, 1928
- Hymedesmia pachychela Topsent, 1928
- Hymedesmia palmatichela Topsent, 1928
- Hymedesmia palmatichelifera van Soest, 1984
- Hymedesmia pansa Bowerbank, 1882
- Hymedesmia parva Stephens, 1915
- Hymedesmia paupertas (Bowerbank, 1866)
- Hymedesmia peachii Bowerbank, 1882
- Hymedesmia pennata Brøndsted, 1932
- Hymedesmia perforata Lundbeck, 1910
- Hymedesmia peruana Salani, Willenz, Fernandez & Hajdu, 2022
- Hymedesmia pilata Bowerbank, 1882
- Hymedesmia planca Lundbeck, 1910
- Hymedesmia planisigma Topsent, 1928
- Hymedesmia platychela Lundbeck, 1910
- Hymedesmia plicata Topsent, 1928
- Hymedesmia poicilacantha Alander, 1942
- Hymedesmia procumbens Lundbeck, 1910
- Hymedesmia promina Turner & Lonhart, 2023
- Hymedesmia prostrata Thiele, 1903
- Hymedesmia proxima Lundbeck, 1910
- Hymedesmia pugio Lundbeck, 1910
- Hymedesmia quadridentata Cardone, Pansini, Corriero & Bertolino, 2019
- Hymedesmia rathlinia Goodwin & Picton, 2009
- Hymedesmia rhaphigena (Topsent, 1904)
- Hymedesmia rissoi Topsent, 1936
- Hymedesmia rowi Van Soest, 2017
- Hymedesmia rugosa Lundbeck, 1910
- Hymedesmia saccea (Schmidt, 1864)
- Hymedesmia santarositae Salani, Willenz, Fernandez & Hajdu, 2022
- Hymedesmia senegalensis Lévi, 1956
- Hymedesmia serrulata Vacelet, 1969
- Hymedesmia similis Lundbeck, 1910
- Hymedesmia simillima Lundbeck, 1910
- Hymedesmia spinata Calcinai, Bavestrello, Bertolino, Pica, Wagner & Cerrano, 2013
- Hymedesmia spiniarcuata Lévi & Lévi, 1983
- Hymedesmia spinosa Stephens, 1916
- Hymedesmia splenium Lundbeck, 1910
- Hymedesmia stellifera Goodwin & Picton, 2009
- Hymedesmia stoneae Goodwin, Picton & van Soest, 2011
- Hymedesmia storea Lundbeck, 1910
- Hymedesmia stylata Lundbeck, 1910
- Hymedesmia stylophora Thomas, 1970
- Hymedesmia tendali Goodwin, Picton & van Soest, 2011
- Hymedesmia tenuisigma Lundbeck, 1910
- Hymedesmia tenuissima (Dendy, 1905)
- Hymedesmia thielei Alander, 1942
- Hymedesmia trichoma Lundbeck, 1910
- Hymedesmia truncata Lundbeck, 1910
- Hymedesmia uchinourensis Hoshino, 1981
- Hymedesmia umbelliformis Goodwin & Picton, 2009
- Hymedesmia unguifera Burton, 1929
- Hymedesmia vaceleti Díaz & Pomponi, 2018
- Hymedesmia valentinae Goodwin, Picton & van Soest, 2011
- Hymedesmia velata Topsent, 1928
- Hymedesmia veneta (Schmidt, 1862)
- Hymedesmia verrucosa Lundbeck, 1910
- Hymedesmia versicolor (Topsent, 1893)
- Hymedesmia vicaria Wiedenmayer in Hooper & Wiedenmayer, 1994
- Hymedesmia vomerula Topsent, 1928
- Hymedesmia williami Van Soest & Hooper, 2020
- Hymedesmia xavierae Goodwin, Picton & van Soest, 2011
- Hymedesmia zetlandica Bowerbank, 1864
- Hymedesmia stepanovii (Czerniavsky, 1880) (uncertain > taxon inquirendum)

Subgenus Stylopus

- Hymedesmia acerata (Topsent, 1904)
- Hymedesmia aequata Lundbeck, 1910
- Hymedesmia alcoladoi Van Soest, 2017
- Hymedesmia arndti (de Laubenfels, 1930)
- Hymedesmia australiensis (Hentschel, 1911)
- Hymedesmia australis (Bergquist & Fromont, 1988)
- Hymedesmia coriacea (Fristedt, 1885)
- Hymedesmia crami Goodwin & Picton, 2009
- Hymedesmia dendyi Burton, 1930
- Hymedesmia dermata Lundbeck, 1910
- Hymedesmia ernsthentscheli Van Soest & Hooper, 2020
- Hymedesmia fristedti (Topsent, 1916)
- Hymedesmia hentscheli Van Soest & Hooper, 2020
- Hymedesmia hibernica Stephens, 1916
- Hymedesmia indivisa (Topsent, 1928)
- Hymedesmia lissostyla (Bergquist & Fromont, 1988)
- Hymedesmia longurius Lundbeck, 1910
- Hymedesmia methanophila Cárdenas, 2019
- Hymedesmia mucronella Lundbeck, 1910
- Hymedesmia nigrescens (Topsent, 1925)
- Hymedesmia obtusata (Topsent, 1904)
- Hymedesmia oculifera (Hentschel, 1911)
- Hymedesmia odhneri (Alander, 1942)
- Hymedesmia parvispicula Burton & Rao, 1932
- Hymedesmia perlucida Calcinai, Bavestrello, Bertolino, Pica, Wagner & Cerrano, 2013
- Hymedesmia pharos Goodwin, Brewin & Brickle, 2012
- Hymedesmia primitiva Lundbeck, 1910
- Hymedesmia pulposus (Topsent, 1925)
- Hymedesmia stephensi Burton, 1930
- Hymedesmia stylifera (Alander, 1942)
- Hymedesmia tornotata Lundbeck, 1910
- Hymedesmia ramentum Koltun, 1970

Subgenus not assigned

- Hymedesmia sp. 'Parpal Dumplin'
