= Aldisa williamsi =

Scientific classification
- Kingdom: Animalia
- Phylum: Mollusca
- Class: Gastropoda
- Order: Nudibranchia
- Family: Cadlinidae
- Genus: Aldisa
- Species: A. williamsi

Binomial name
- Aldisa williamsi Elwood, Valdes & Gosliner, 2000

Species of gastropod

Aldisa williamsi is a species of sea slug, a dorid nudibranch, a marine gastropod mollusk in the family Cadlinidae.

== Distribution ==
This species was described from Barracuda Point in Papua New Guinea. It has subsequently been found in Sulawesi, Flores, Rinca Is. and Pantar Is., in Indonesia.
