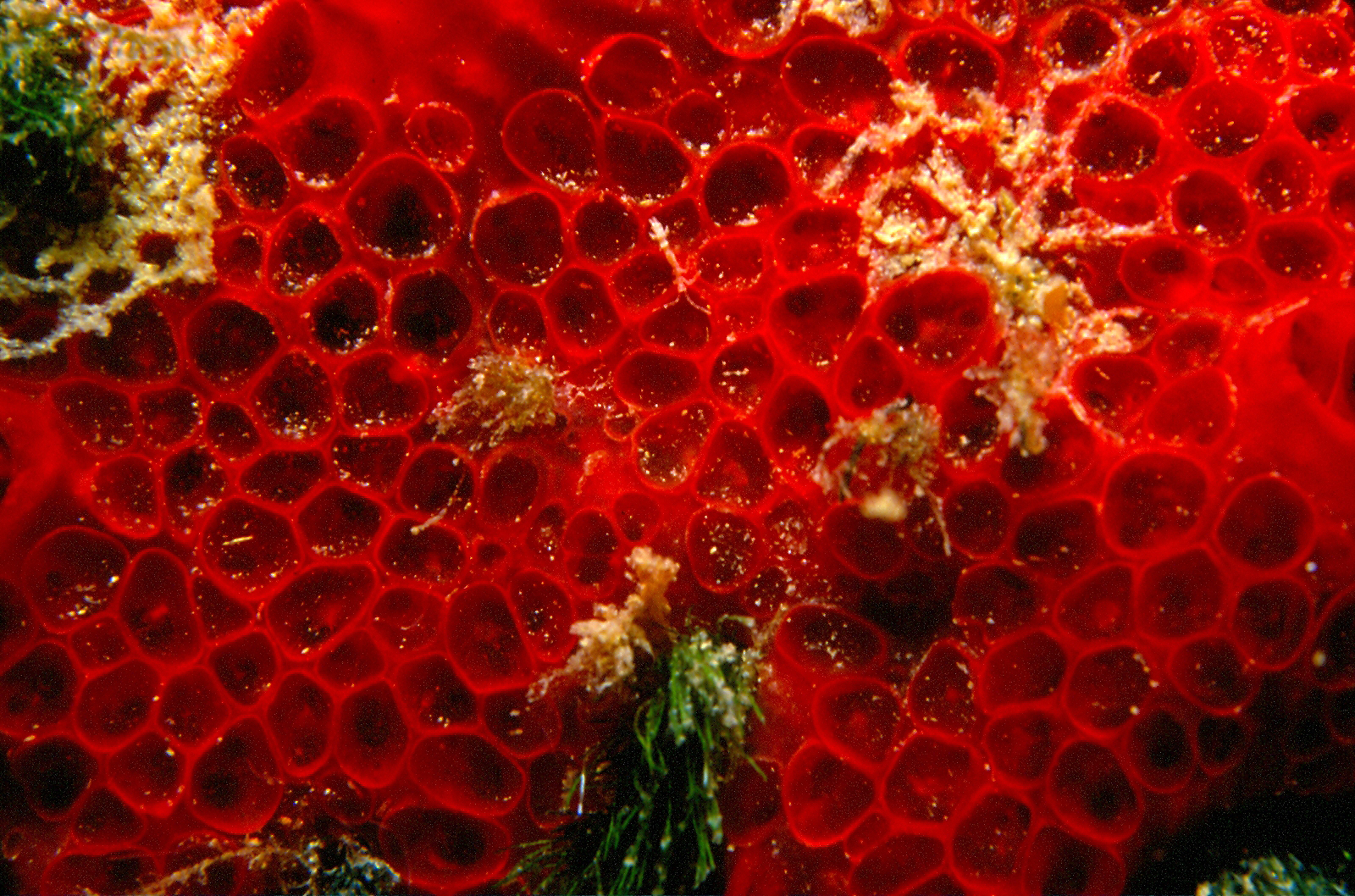
- Hamigera hamigera

Scientific classification
- Kingdom: Animalia
- Phylum: Porifera
- Class: Demospongiae
- Order: Poecilosclerida
- Family: Hymedesmiidae
- Genus: Hamigera; Gray, 1867

= Hamigera (sponge) =

Genus of sponges

Hamigera is a genus of sponges belonging to the family Hymedesmiidae.

The species of this genus are found in Europe, Northern America and Australia.

Species:

- Hamigera bibiloniae Santín, Grinyó, Uriz & Gili, 2020
- Hamigera cleistochela Bertolino, Costa & Pansini, 2019
- Hamigera dendyi Shaw, 1927
- Hamigera hamigera (Schmidt, 1862)
- Hamigera kellyae Santín, Grinyó, Uriz & Gili, 2020
- Hamigera macrostrongyla Bergquist & Fromont, 1988
- Hamigera strongylata Burton, 1934
- Hamigera tarangaensis Bergquist & Fromont, 1988
