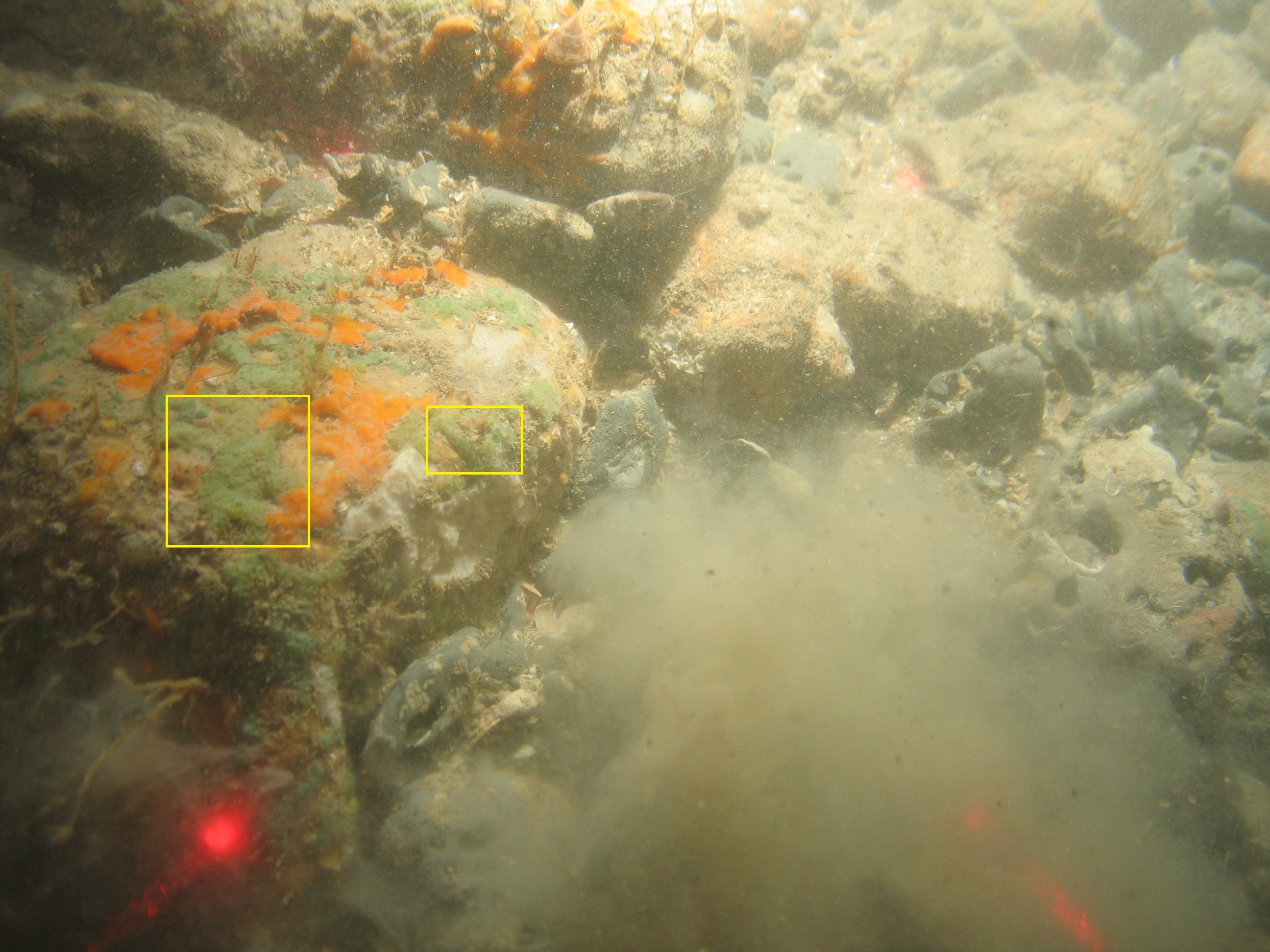
- green Hymedesmiidae

Scientific classification
- Kingdom: Animalia
- Phylum: Porifera
- Class: Demospongiae
- Order: Poecilosclerida
- Family: Hymedesmiidae; Topsent, 1928

Genera
- See text

Synonyms
- Anchinoidae Topsent, 1928

= Hymedesmiidae =

Family of sponges

Hymedesmiidae is a family of demosponges in the order Poecilosclerida.

== Genera ==
- Acanthancora
- Hamigera
- Hemimycale
- Hymedesmia
- Kirkpatrickia
- Myxodoryx
- Phorbas
- Plocamionida
- Pseudohalichondria
- Spanioplon
