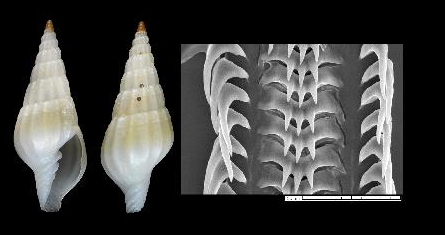
- Shell and radula of Alisimitra barazeri (holotype at MNHN, Paris)

Scientific classification
- Kingdom: Animalia
- Phylum: Mollusca
- Class: Gastropoda
- Subclass: Caenogastropoda
- Order: Neogastropoda
- Superfamily: Turbinelloidea
- Family: Costellariidae
- Genus: Alisimitra
- Species: A. barazeri

Binomial name
- Alisimitra barazeri Fedosov, Herrmann & Bouchet, 2017
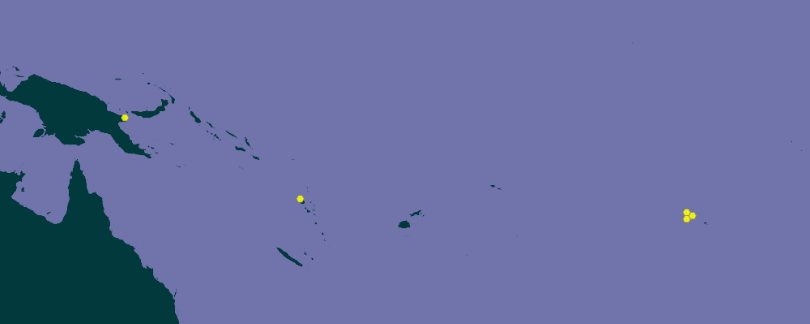

= Alisimitra barazeri =

Species of gastropod

Alisimitra barazeri is a species of sea snail, a marine gastropod mollusk, in the family Costellariidae, the ribbed miters.

== Description ==
The length of the shell attains 14.4 mm.

== Distribution ==
This species occurs in the following locations:

- French Polynesia
- Papua New Guinea
- Vanuatu
