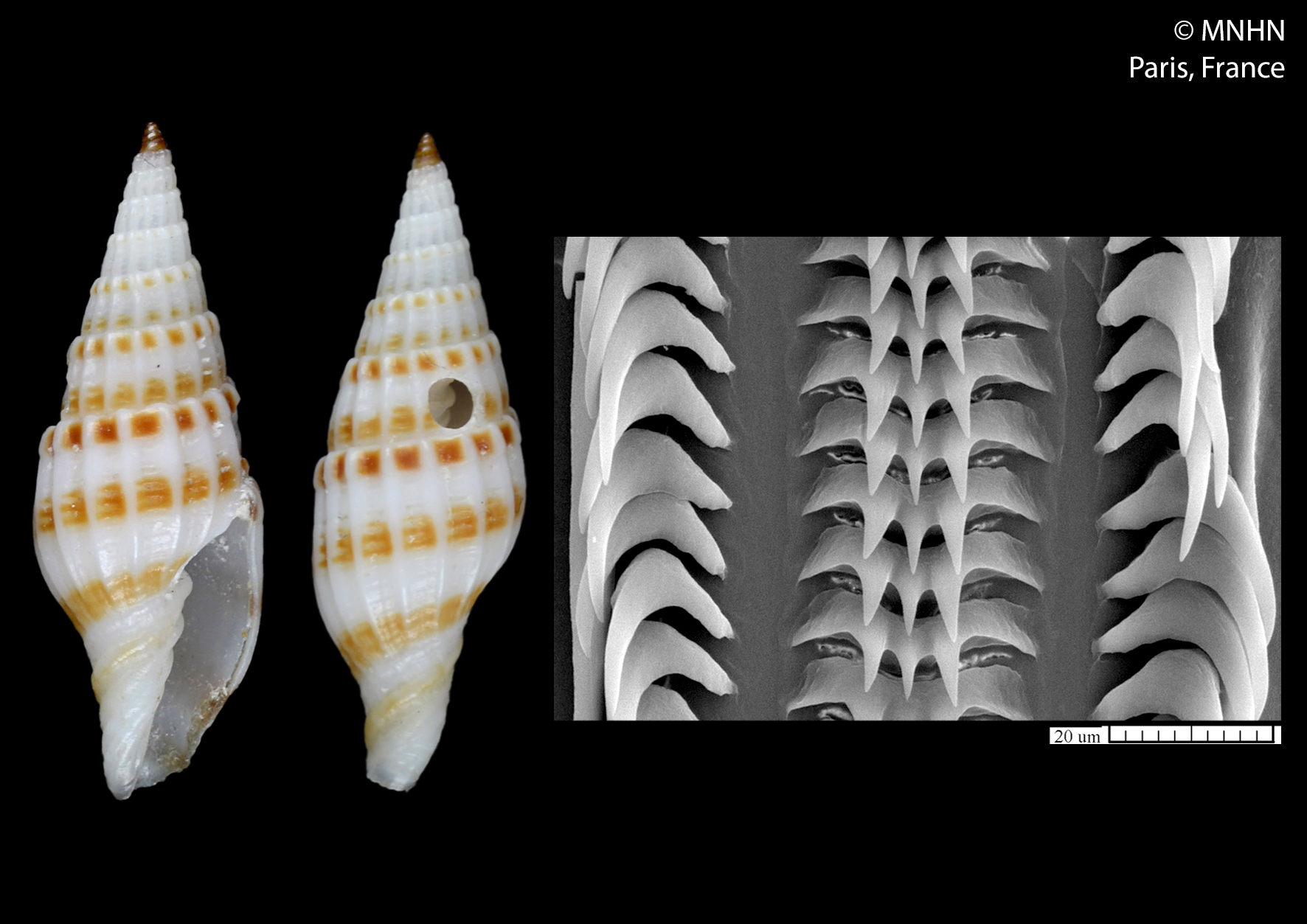

Scientific classification
- Kingdom: Animalia
- Phylum: Mollusca
- Class: Gastropoda
- Subclass: Caenogastropoda
- Order: Neogastropoda
- Superfamily: Turbinelloidea
- Family: Costellariidae
- Genus: Alisimitra
- Species: A. deforgesi

Binomial name
- Alisimitra deforgesi Fedosov, Herrmann & Bouchet, 2017
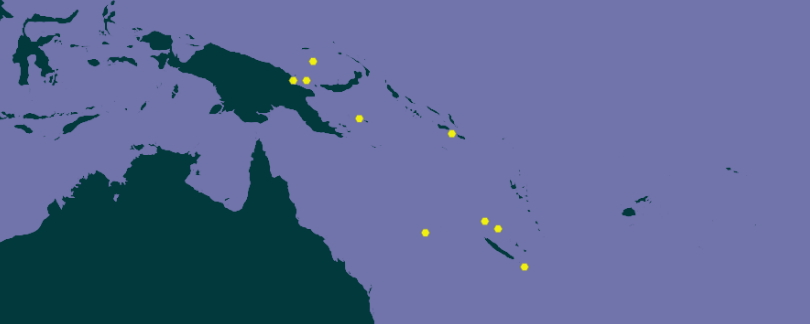

= Alisimitra deforgesi =

Species of gastropod

Alisimitra deforgesi is a species of sea snail, a marine gastropod mollusk, in the family Costellariidae, the ribbed miters.

== Description ==
The length of the shell attains 14.5 mm.

== Distribution ==
This species occurs in the following locations:

- Coral Sea
- New Caledonia
- Papua New Guinea
- Solomon Islands
