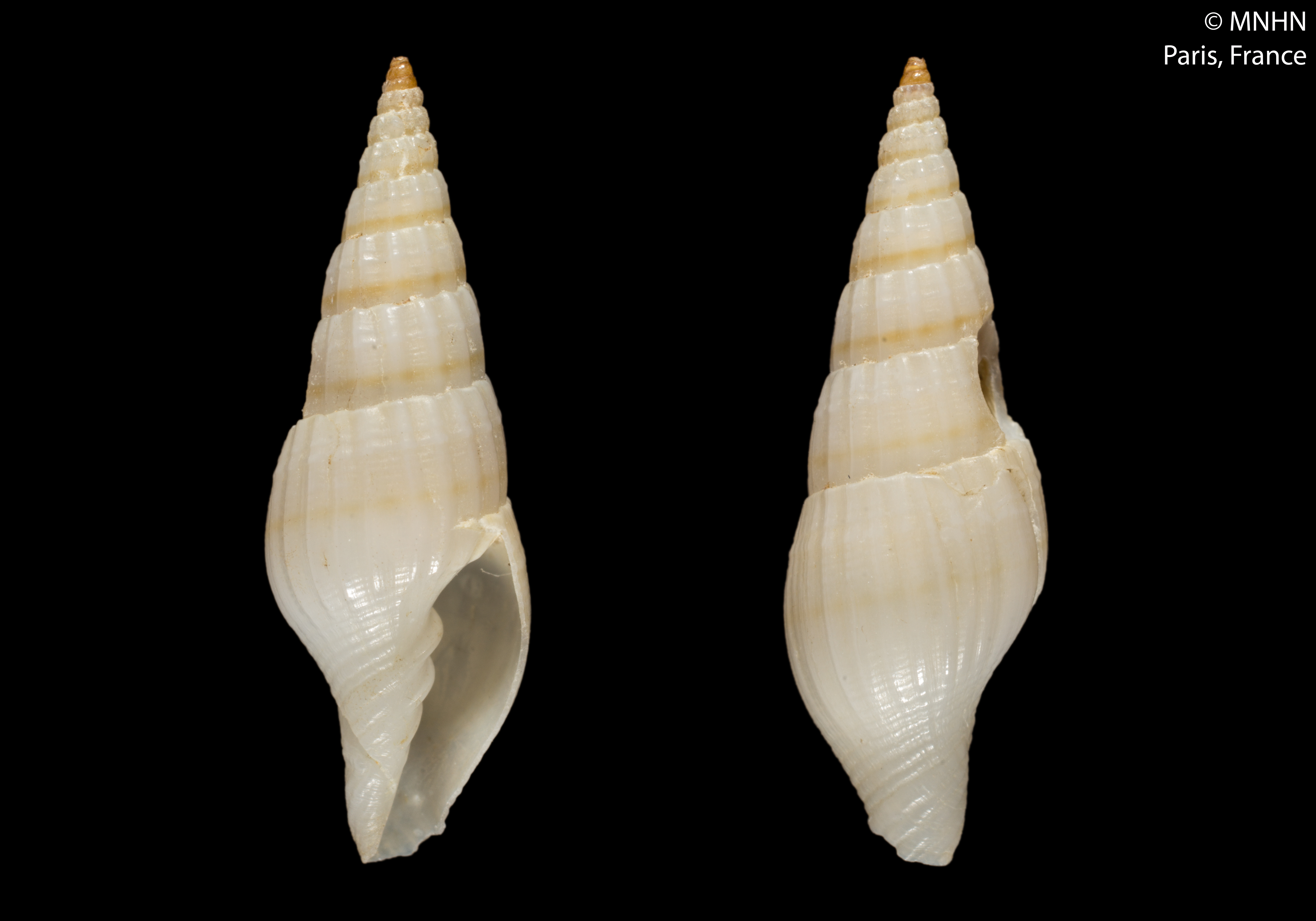
- Shell of Alisimitra fuscolineata (holotype at MNHN, Paris)

Scientific classification
- Kingdom: Animalia
- Phylum: Mollusca
- Class: Gastropoda
- Subclass: Caenogastropoda
- Order: Neogastropoda
- Superfamily: Turbinelloidea
- Family: Costellariidae
- Genus: Alisimitra
- Species: A. fuscolineata

Binomial name
- Alisimitra fuscolineata (Herrmann & Salisbury, 2012)
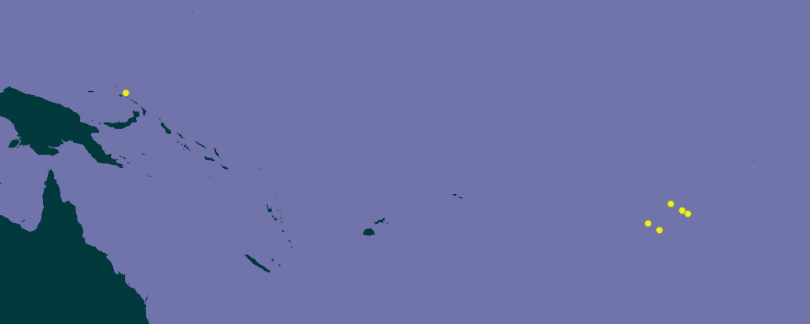

Synonyms
- Vexillum (Costellaria) fuscolineatum Herrmann & Salisbury, 2012; Vexillum fuscolineatum Herrmann & Salisbury, 2012

= Alisimitra fuscolineata =

Species of gastropod

Alisimitra fuscolineata is a species of sea snail, a marine gastropod mollusk, in the family Costellariidae, the ribbed miters.

== Distribution ==
This marine species occurs off Papua New Guinea, French Polynesia (the Society Islands).
