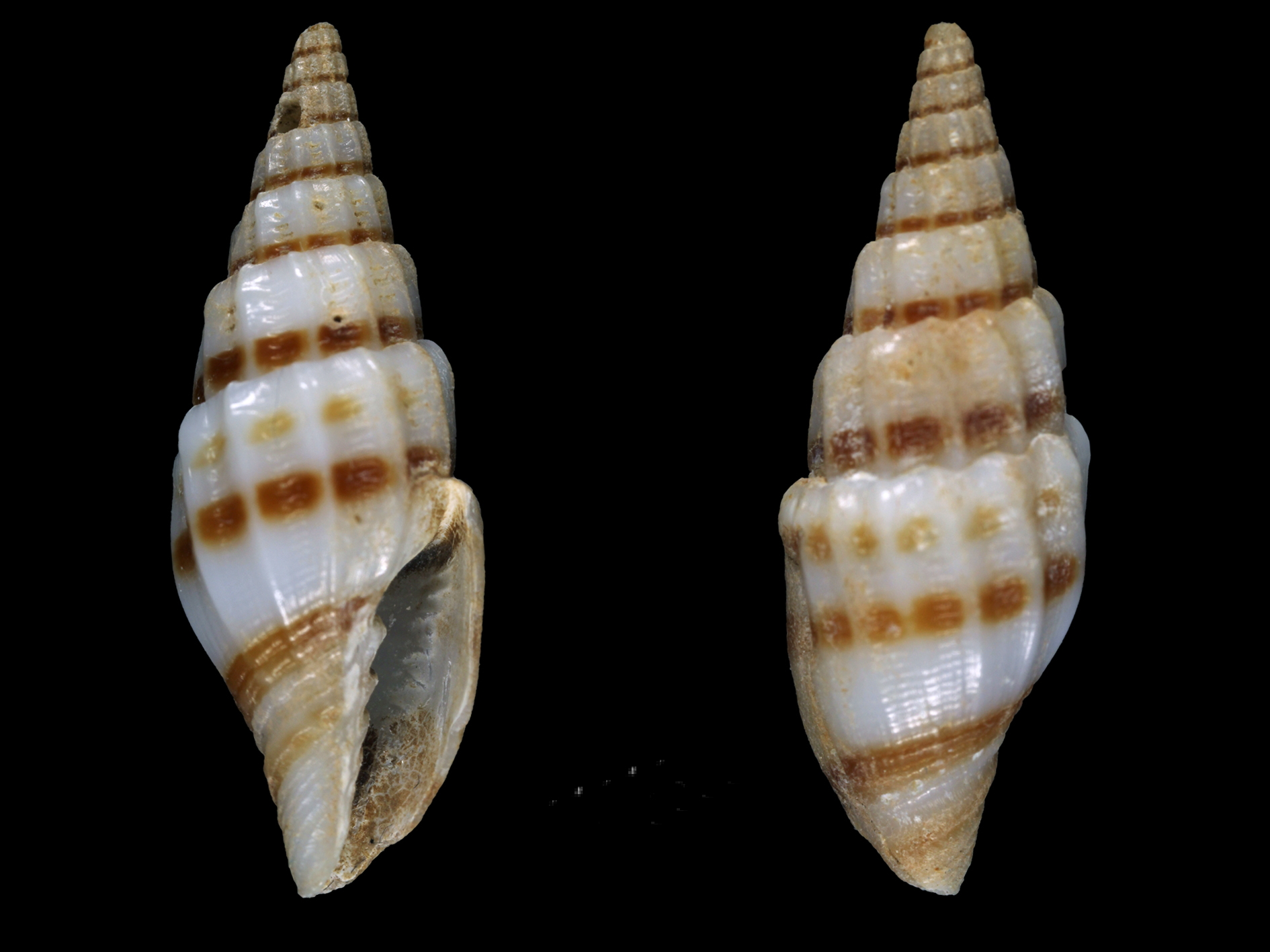
- Shell of Alisimitra polynesiensis (holotype at MNHN, Paris)

Scientific classification
- Kingdom: Animalia
- Phylum: Mollusca
- Class: Gastropoda
- Subclass: Caenogastropoda
- Order: Neogastropoda
- Superfamily: Turbinelloidea
- Family: Costellariidae
- Genus: Alisimitra
- Species: A. polynesiensis

Binomial name
- Alisimitra polynesiensis Herrmann & R. Salisbury, 2019

= Alisimitra polynesiensis =

Species of gastropod

Alisimitra polynesiensis is a species of sea snail, a marine gastropod mollusk, in the family Costellariidae, the ribbed miters.

== Distribution ==
This species occurs in the following locations:

- Tahiti
