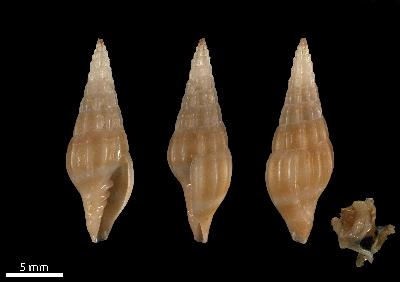
- Shell of Alisimitra tehuaorum (specimen at MNHN, Paris)

Scientific classification
- Kingdom: Animalia
- Phylum: Mollusca
- Class: Gastropoda
- Subclass: Caenogastropoda
- Order: Neogastropoda
- Superfamily: Turbinelloidea
- Family: Costellariidae
- Genus: Alisimitra
- Species: A. tehuaorum

Binomial name
- Alisimitra tehuaorum (Huang, 2015)
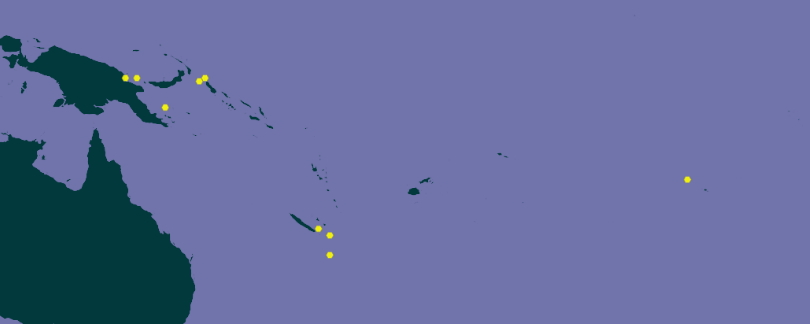

Synonyms
- Tongsuapusia tehuaorum Huang, 2015

= Alisimitra tehuaorum =

Species of gastropod

Alisimitra tehuaorum is a species of sea snail, a marine gastropod mollusk, in the family Costellariidae, the ribbed miters.

== Description ==
The length of the shell attains 20.7 mm.

== Distribution ==
This species occurs in the following locations:

- New Caledonia
- Papua New Guinea
- Society Islands
- South China Sea
- Taiwan
