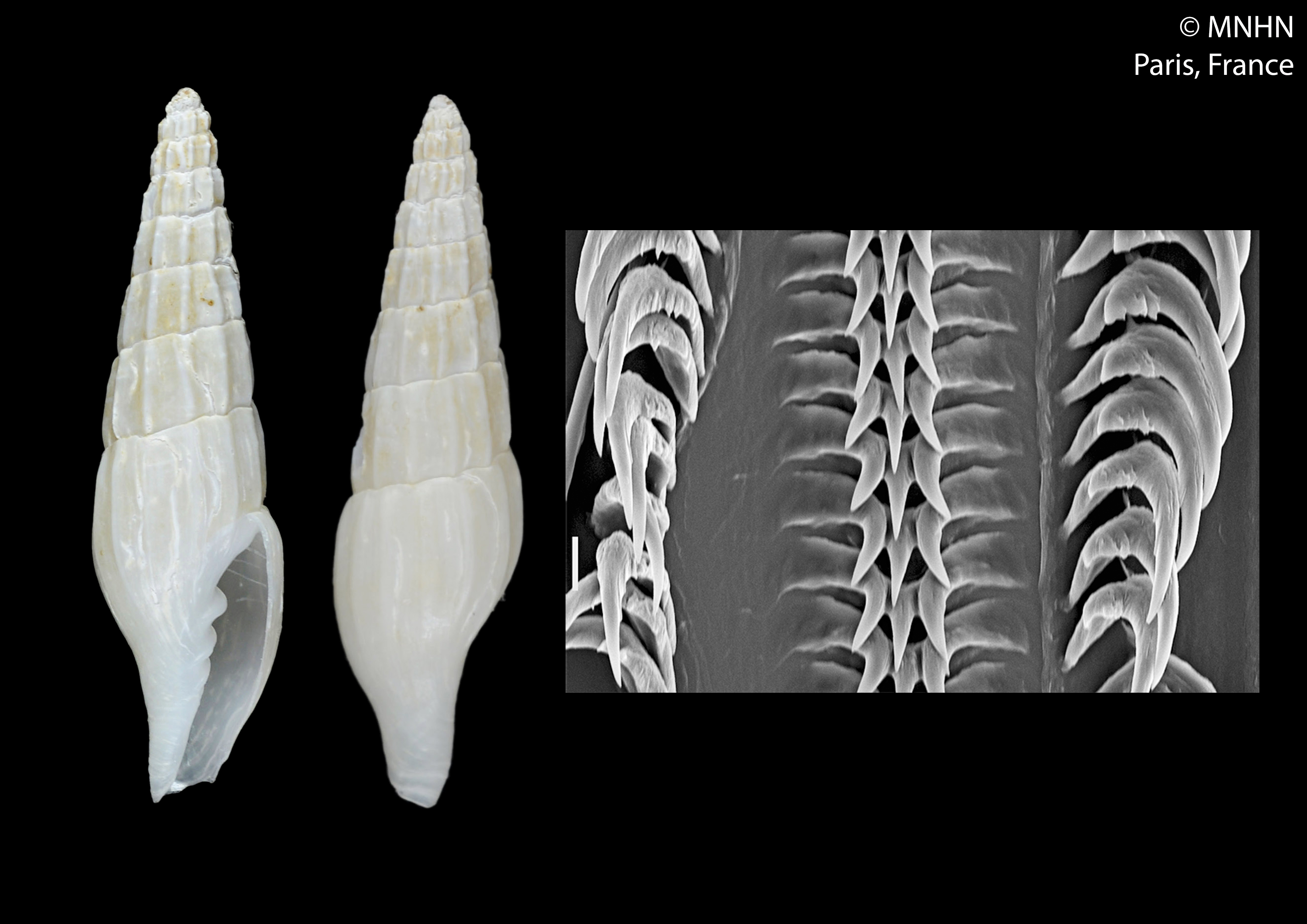
- Shell and radula of Alisimitra samadiae (holotype at MNHN, Paris)

Scientific classification
- Kingdom: Animalia
- Phylum: Mollusca
- Class: Gastropoda
- Subclass: Caenogastropoda
- Order: Neogastropoda
- Superfamily: Turbinelloidea
- Family: Costellariidae
- Genus: Alisimitra; Fedosov, Herrmann & Bouchet, 2017

Type species
- Alisimitra barazeri Fedosov, Herrmann & Bouchet, 2017
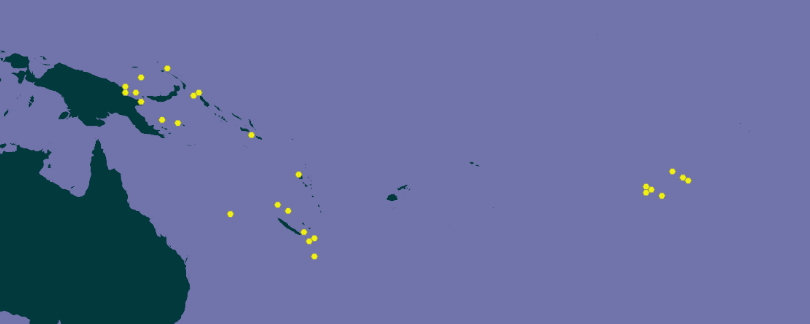

= Alisimitra =

Genus of gastropods

Alisimitra is a genus of sea snails, marine gastropod mollusks, in the family Costellariidae, the ribbed miters.

== Species ==
Species within the genus Alisimitra include:

- Alisimitra barazeri Fedosov, Herrmann & Bouchet, 2017
- Alisimitra deforgesi Fedosov, Herrmann & Bouchet, 2017
- Alisimitra fuscolineata (Herrmann & Salisbury, 2012)
- Alisimitra polynesiensis Herrmann & R. Salisbury, 2019
- Alisimitra samadiae Fedosov, Herrmann & Bouchet, 2017
- Alisimitra tehuaorum (Huang, 2015)

== Distribution ==
This species occurs in the following locations:

- New Caledonia
- Papua New Guinea
- French Polynesia
- Society Islands
- South China Sea
