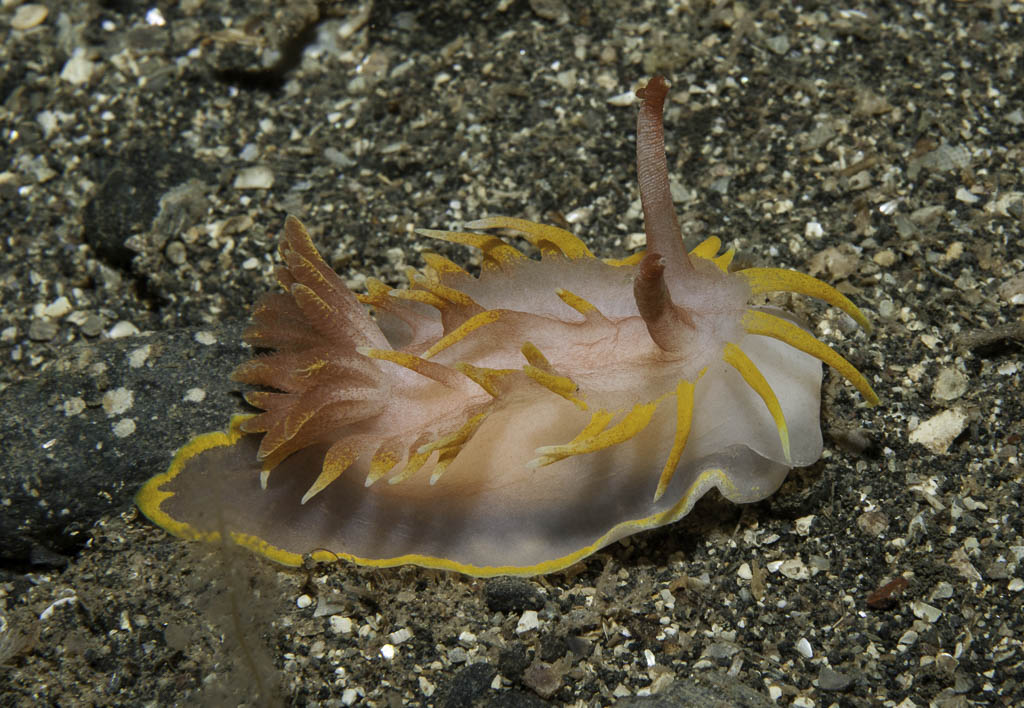
- Okenia elegans, head end towards the right

Scientific classification
- Kingdom: Animalia
- Phylum: Mollusca
- Class: Gastropoda
- Order: Nudibranchia
- Family: Goniodorididae
- Subfamily: Goniodoridinae
- Genus: Okenia; Menke, 1830

Type species
- Idalia elegans Leuckart, 1828

Synonyms
- Goniodoris Forbes & Goodsir, 1839; Idalia Leuckart, 1828; Idaliella Bergh, 1881; Idalina A. M. Norman, 1890; Idalla Örsted, 1844

= Okenia =

Genus of gastropods

Okenia is a genus of colorful sea slugs, specifically of dorid nudibranchs, marine gastropod mollusks in the subfamily Goniodoridinae in the family Goniodorididae.

== Species ==
Species within the genus Okenia include:

- Okenia academica Camacho-Garcia & Gosliner, 2004
- Okenia ameliae Ortea, Moro & Caballer, 2014
- Okenia amoenula (Bergh, 1907)
- Okenia angelica Gosliner & Bertsch, 2004
- Okenia ascidicola M.P. Morse, 1972
- Okenia aspersa (Alder & Hancock, 1845)
- Okenia aurorapapillata Paz-Sedano & Pola in Paz-Sedano, Wilson, Carmona, Gosliner & Pola, 2021
- Okenia babai Hamatani, 1961
- Okenia echinata Baba, 1949
- Okenia elegans (Leuckart, 1828) - type species
- Okenia elisae Paz-Sedano & Pola in Paz-Sedano, Wilson, Carmona, Gosliner & Pola, 2021
- Okenia eolida (Quoy & Gaimard, 1832)
- Okenia hispanica Valdes & Ortea, 1995
- Okenia leachii (Alder & Hancock, 1854)
- Okenia luna Millen, Schrödl, Vargas, & Indacochea, 1994
- Okenia mediterranea (Ihering, 1886)
- Okenia nodosa (Montagu, 1808)
- Okenia opuntia Baba, 1960
- Okenia pulchella Alder & Hancock, 1854
- Okenia rhinorma Rudman, 2007

Nomen dubium

- Okenia pusilla Sordi, 1974

Synonyms

- Okenia africana Edmunds, 2009: synonym of Ceratodoris africana (Edmunds, 2009)
- Okenia angelensis Lance, 1966: synonym of Bermudella angelensis (Lance, 1966)
- Okenia atkinsonorum Rudman, 2007: synonym of Ceratodoris atkinsonorum (Rudman, 2007)
- Okenia barnardi Baba, 1937: synonym of Ceratodoris barnardi (Baba, 1937)
- Okenia brunneomaculata Gosliner, 2004: synonym of Bermudella brunneomaculata (Gosliner, 2004)
- Okenia cochimi Gosliner & Bertsch, 2004: synonym of Goniodoridella cochimi (Gosliner & Bertsch, 2004)
- Okenia cupella (Vogel & Schultz, 1970): synonym of Cargoa cupella Vogel & L. P. Schultz, 1970
- Okenia dautzenbergi Vayssière, 1919: synonym of Okenia aspersa (Alder & Hancock, 1845)
- Okenia digitata (Edmunds, 1966): synonym of Ceratodoris digitata (Edmunds, 1966)
- Okenia distincta Baba, 1940: synonym of Bermudella distincta (Baba, 1940)
- Okenia elisae Paz-Sedano & Pola, 2021: synonym of Ceratodoris elisae Paz-Sedano & Pola, 2021
- Okenia eolida (Quoy & Gaimard, 1832): synonym of Ceratodoris eolida (Quoy & Gaimard, 1832)
- Okenia evelinae Er. Marcus, 1957: synonym of Bermudella evelinae (Er. Marcus, 1957)
- Okenia felis Gosliner, 2010: synonym of Goniodoridella felis (Gosliner, 2010)
- Okenia ghanensis Edmunds, 2009: synonym of Cargoa ghanensis (Edmunds, 2009)
- Okenia hallucigenia Rudman, 2004: synonym of Ceratodoris hallucigenia (Rudman, 2004)
- Okenia harastii Pola, Roldán & Padilla, 2014: synonym of Bermudella harastii (Pola, Roldán & Padilla, 2014)
- Okenia hiroi (Baba, 1938): synonym of Ceratodoris hiroi (Baba, 1938)
- Okenia impexa Er. Marcus, 1957: synonym of Cargoa impexa (Er. Marcus, 1957)
- Okenia japonica Baba, 1949: synonym of Bermudella japonica (Baba, 1949)
- Okenia kendi Gosliner, 2004: synonym of Ceratodoris kendi (Gosliner, 2004)
- Okenia kondoi (Hamatani, 2001): synonym of Ceratodoris kondoi (Hamatani, 2001)
- Okenia lambat Gosliner, 2004: synonym of Ceratodoris lambat (Gosliner, 2004)
- Okenia liklik Gosliner, 2004: synonym of Naisdoris liklik (Gosliner, 2004)
- Okenia longiductis Pola, Paz-Sedano, Macali, Minchin, Marchini, Vitale, Licchelli & Crocetta, 2019: synonym of Bermudella polycerelloides Ortea & Bouchet, 1983
- Okenia mellita Rudman, 2004: synonym of Ceratodoris mellita (Rudman, 2004)
- Okenia mexicorum Gosliner & Bertsch, 2004: synonym of Goniodoridella mexicorum (Gosliner & Bertsch, 2004)
- Okenia mica Ortea & Moro, 2014: synonym of Bermudella mica (Ortea & Moro, 2014)
- Okenia mija Burn, 1967: synonym of Bermudella mija (Burn, 1967)
- Okenia miramarae Ortea & Espinosa, 2000: synonym of Goniodoridella miramarae (Ortea & Espinosa, 2000)
- Okenia modesta (A. E. Verrill, 1875): synonym of Okenia aspersa (Alder & Hancock, 1845)
- Okenia nakamotoensis (Hamatani, 2001): synonym of Ceratodoris nakamotoensis (Hamatani, 2001)
- Okenia nakanoae Paz-Sedano & Pola in Paz-Sedano, Wilson, Carmona, Gosliner & Pola, 2021: synonym of Ceratodoris nakanoae (Paz-Sedano & Pola, 2021)
- Okenia pellucida Burn, 1967: synonym of Bermudella pellucida (Burn, 1967)
- Okenia picoensis Paz-Sedano, Ortigosa & Pola, 2017: synonym of Goniodoridella picoensis (Paz-Sedano, Ortigosa & Pola, 2017)
- Okenia pilosa (Bouchet & Ortea, 1983): synonym of Ceratodoris pilosa (Bouchet & Ortea, 1983)
- Okenia plana Baba, 1960: synonym of Ceratodoris plana (Baba, 1960)
- Okenia plebeia Bergh, 1902: synonym of Ceratodoris plebeia (Bergh, 1902)
- Okenia polycerelloides (Ortea & Bouchet, 1983): synonym of Bermudella polycerelloides Ortea & Bouchet, 1983
- Okenia problematica Pola, Paz-Sedano, Macali, Minchin, Marchini, Vitale, Licchelli & Crocetta, 2019: synonym of Cargoa problematica (Pola, Paz-Sedano, Macali, Minchin, Marchini, Vitale, Licchelli & Crocetta, 2019)
- Okenia purpurata Rudman, 2004: synonym of Bermudella purpurata (Rudman, 2004)
- Okenia purpureolineata Gosliner, 2004: synonym of Bermudella purpureolineata (Gosliner, 2004)
- Okenia quadricornis (Montagu, 1815): synonym of Okenia aspersa (Alder & Hancock, 1845)
- Okenia rosacea (MacFarland, 1905): synonym of Ceratodoris rosacea (MacFarland, 1905)
- Okenia sapelona Ev. Marcus & Er. Marcus, 1967: synonym of Ceratodoris sapelona (Ev. Marcus & Er. Marcus, 1967)
- Okenia siderata Paz-Sedano & Pola in Paz-Sedano, Wilson, Carmona, Gosliner & Pola, 2021: synonym of Bermudella siderata (Paz-Sedano & Pola, 2021)
- Okenia stellata Rudman, 2004: synonym of Ceratodoris stellata (Rudman, 2004)
- Okenia tenuifibrata Paz-Sedano & Pola in Paz-Sedano, Wilson, Carmona, Gosliner & Pola, 2021: synonym of Ceratodoris tenuifibrata (Paz-Sedano & Pola, 2021)
- Okenia vancouverensis (O'Donoghue, 1921): synonym of Ceratodoris vancouverensis (O'Donoghue, 1921)
- Okenia vena Rudman, 2004: synonym of Bermudella vena (Rudman, 2004)
- Okenia virginiae Gosliner, 2004: synonym of Ceratodoris virginiae (Gosliner, 2004)
- Okenia zoobotryon (Smallwood, 1910): synonym of Bermudella zoobotryon (Smallwood, 1910)
