= Kendi =

Kendi may refer to

- Kendi (name)
- Kendi Island near Penang Island, Malaysia
- Okenia kendi, a species of sea slug

== See also ==
- Kendis
