= Cargoa impexa =

Scientific classification
- Kingdom: Animalia
- Phylum: Mollusca
- Class: Gastropoda
- Order: Nudibranchia
- Family: Goniodorididae
- Subfamily: Goniodoridinae
- Genus: Cargoa
- Species: C. impexa

Binomial name
- Cargoa impexa (Er. Marcus, 1957)

Synonyms
- Okenia impexa Er. Marcus, 1957

Species of gastropod

Cargoa impexa is a species of sea slug, specifically a dorid nudibranch, a marine gastropod mollusc in the subfamily Goniodoridinae in the family Goniodorididae.

== Distribution ==
This species was described from Brazil. It is known from Brazil north to North Carolina, USA. It has also been reported from the western Mediterranean and the Cape Verde Islands.

== Description ==
This Cargoa has a tall body and about five or six lateral papillae on each side of the mantle.

The maximum recorded body length is 3–4 mm or up to 7 mm.

== Habitat ==
Minimum recorded depth is 0 m. Maximum recorded depth is 0 m.

== Ecology ==
The diet of this species is unknown but the shape of the animal resembles ascidian eating species of Okenia such as Okenia aspersa.
