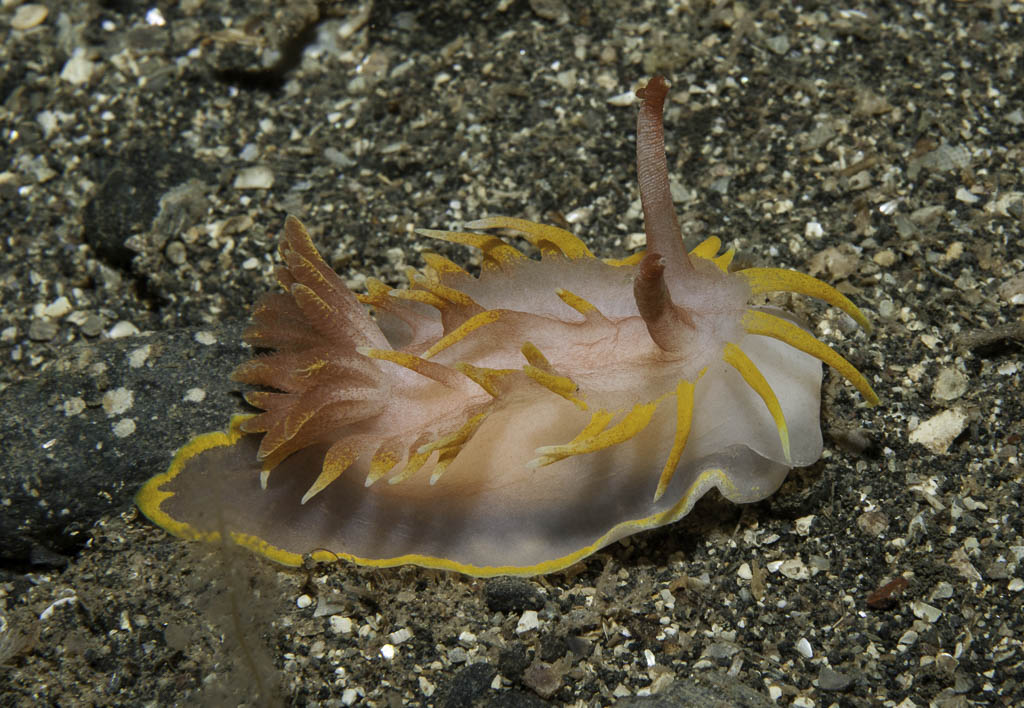
- Rathlin Island, County Antrim, Northern Ireland.

Scientific classification
- Kingdom: Animalia
- Phylum: Mollusca
- Class: Gastropoda
- Order: Nudibranchia
- Family: Goniodorididae
- Genus: Okenia
- Species: O. elegans

Binomial name
- Okenia elegans (Leuckart, 1828)

Synonyms
- Idalia elegans Leuckart, 1828; Euplocamus laciniosus Philippi, 1841; Idalia cirrigera Philippi, 1844; Idalia dautzenbergi Vayssière, 1919

= Okenia elegans =

Species of gastropod

Okenia elegans, the yellow skirt slug, is a species of a sea slug, specifically a dorid nudibranch, a marine gastropod mollusc in the family Goniodorididae. It is the type species of its genus.

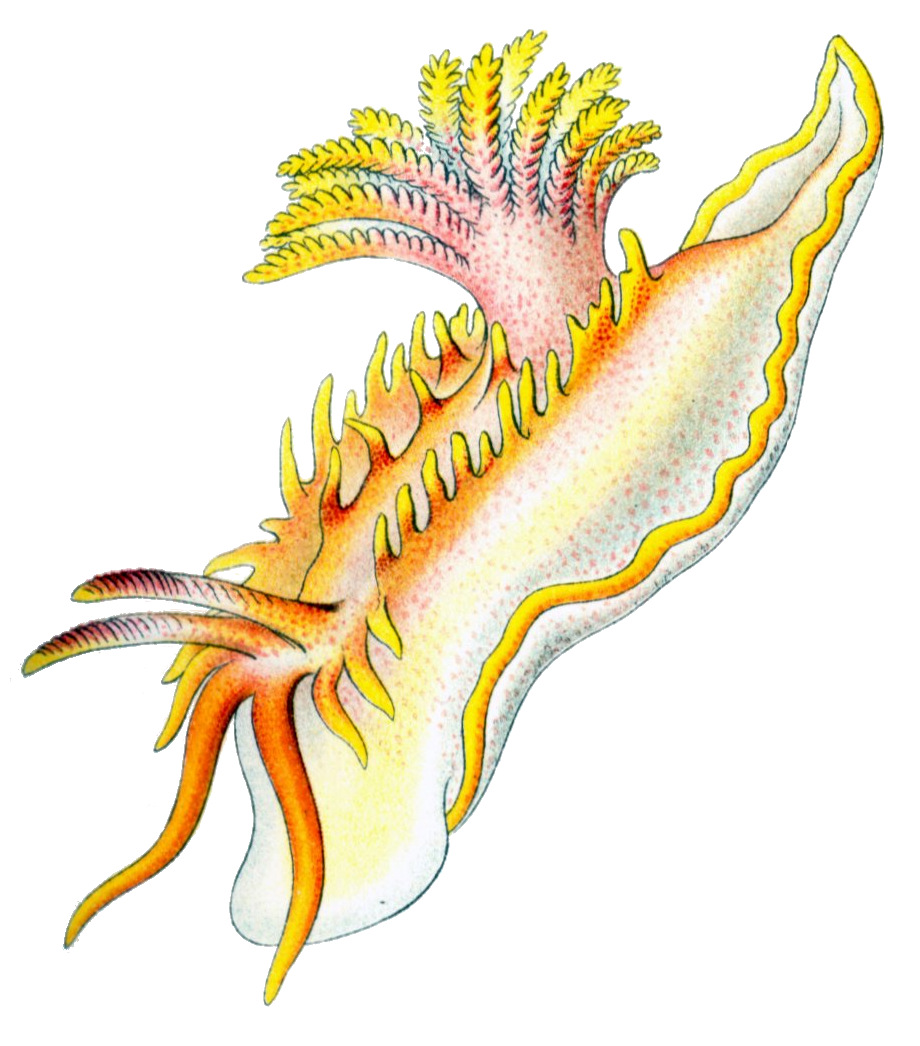
Drawing of Okenia elegans from Kunstformen der Natur (1904)

== Distribution ==
This species was described from near Sète on the Mediterranean Sea coast of France. It is reported from the adjacent Atlantic Ocean as far north as Scotland.
