= Okenia academica =

Scientific classification
- Kingdom: Animalia
- Phylum: Mollusca
- Class: Gastropoda
- Order: Nudibranchia
- Family: Goniodorididae
- Genus: Okenia
- Species: O. academica

Binomial name
- Okenia academica Camacho-García & Gosliner, 2004

Species of gastropod

Okenia academica is a species of sea slug, specifically a dorid nudibranch, a marine gastropod mollusc in the family Goniodorididae.

== Distribution ==
This species was described from three specimens collected on the shore at Punta San Francisco, Playa Tamarindo, Parque Nacional Las Baulas, Area de Conservación Tempisque, 9°03′58″N 85°51′08″W (Position given is offshore; possibly 10.300657°N 85.843565°W) and 9°34′53″N 85°08′26″W, on the Pacific Ocean coast of Costa Rica.

== Description ==
This Okenia has a broad body and eight lateral papillae. The body is opaque white and the back is covered with small round red-brown tubercles.

== Ecology ==
The diet of this species is unknown.
