= Goniodoridella savignyi =

Scientific classification
- Kingdom: Animalia
- Phylum: Mollusca
- Class: Gastropoda
- Order: Nudibranchia
- Family: Goniodorididae
- Genus: Goniodoridella; Pruvot-Fol, 1933
- Species: G. savignyi

Binomial name
- Goniodoridella savignyi Pruvot-Fol, 1933

Species of gastropod

Goniodoridella savignyi is species of sea slug, specifically a dorid nudibranch, a marine gastropod mollusc in the family Goniodorididae.

This nudibranch has a wide distribution and can be found throughout the tropical and subtropical Indo-West Pacific with sightings in Australia, Papua New Guinea, Indonesia, the Yellow Sea, the Japan Sea, the Red Sea and South Africa.

Its color is white with variable amounts of bright yellow dots on top of the spicules. In some specimens, it has shown brownish pigments instead of yellow pigments.
