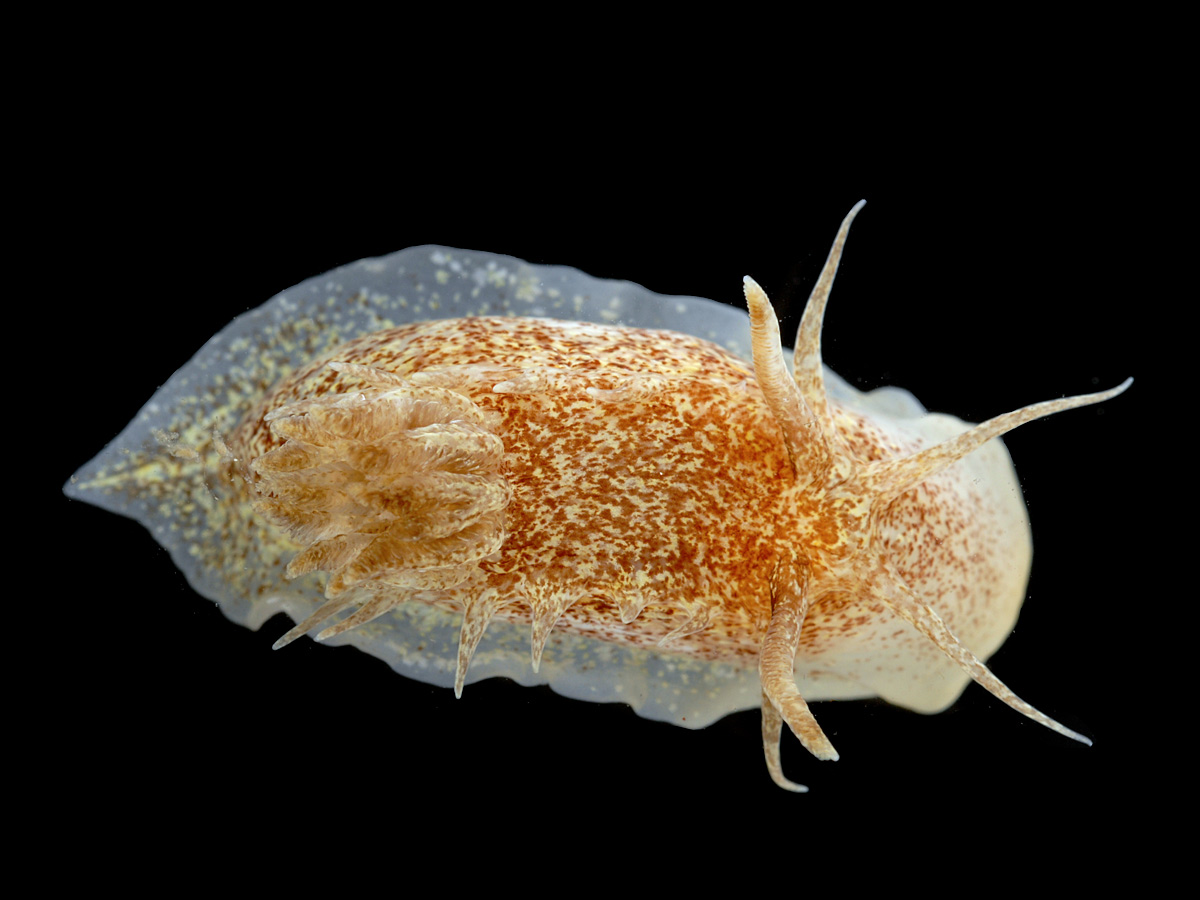
- Okenia pulchella (Firth of Lorn, Scotland)

Scientific classification
- Kingdom: Animalia
- Phylum: Mollusca
- Class: Gastropoda
- Order: Nudibranchia
- Family: Goniodorididae
- Genus: Okenia
- Species: O. pulchella

Binomial name
- Okenia pulchella (Alder & Hancock, 1845)

Synonyms
- Idalia pulchella Alder & Hancock, 1854

= Okenia pulchella =

Species of gastropod

Okenia pulchella is a species of sea slug, a dorid nudibranch, a marine gastropod mollusc in the family Goniodorididae.

== Distribution ==
This species occurs in the North East Atlantic.
