= Okenia mediterranea =

Scientific classification
- Kingdom: Animalia
- Phylum: Mollusca
- Class: Gastropoda
- Order: Nudibranchia
- Family: Goniodorididae
- Genus: Okenia
- Species: O. mediterranea

Binomial name
- Okenia mediterranea (von Ihering, 1886)

Species of gastropod

Okenia mediterranea is a species of sea slug, specifically a dorid nudibranch, a marine gastropod mollusc in the family Goniodorididae.

== Distribution ==
This species was described from the Mediterranean Sea.

== Description ==
This Okenia has a broad body and nine pairs of lateral papillae. There is a ridge of short, partly fused papillae down the midline in front of the gills and a row of three short papillae or tubercles on either side of this ridge. The body is translucent white and the papillae and gills are yellow, spotted with orange. There are additional orange spots on the back in most individuals.

== Ecology ==
The diet of this species is the ctenostome bryozoan Alcyonidium cf. mytili.
