= Okenia hispanica =

Scientific classification
- Kingdom: Animalia
- Phylum: Mollusca
- Class: Gastropoda
- Order: Nudibranchia
- Family: Goniodorididae
- Genus: Okenia
- Species: O. hispanica

Binomial name
- Okenia hispanica Valdés & Ortea, 1995

Species of gastropod

Okenia hispanica is a species of sea slug, specifically a dorid nudibranch, a marine gastropod mollusc in the family Goniodorididae.

== Distribution ==
This species was described from the Alboran Sea, Spain.
