= Cargoa =

- Cargoa cupella

Scientific classification
- Kingdom: Animalia
- Phylum: Mollusca
- Class: Gastropoda
- Order: Nudibranchia
- Family: Goniodorididae
- Subfamily: Goniodoridinae
- Genus: Cargoa; Vogel & L. P. Schultz, 1970

Type species
- Cargoa cupella Vogel & L. P. Schultz, 1970

Genus of gastropods

Cargoa is a genus of sea slugs, marine gastropod molluscs, in the subfamily Goniodoridinae in the family Goniodorididae.

Formerly synonymized with Okenia, it was reinstated in 2024 in a revision of Goniodorid taxonomy.

== Species ==
Species currently within Cargoa include:

- Cargoa cupella Vogel & L. P. Schultz, 1970
- Cargoa ghanensis (Edmunds, 2009)
- Cargoa impexa (Er. Marcus, 1957)
- Cargoa problematica (Pola, Paz-Sedano, Macali, Minchin, Marchini, Vitale, Licchelli & Crocetta, 2019)
