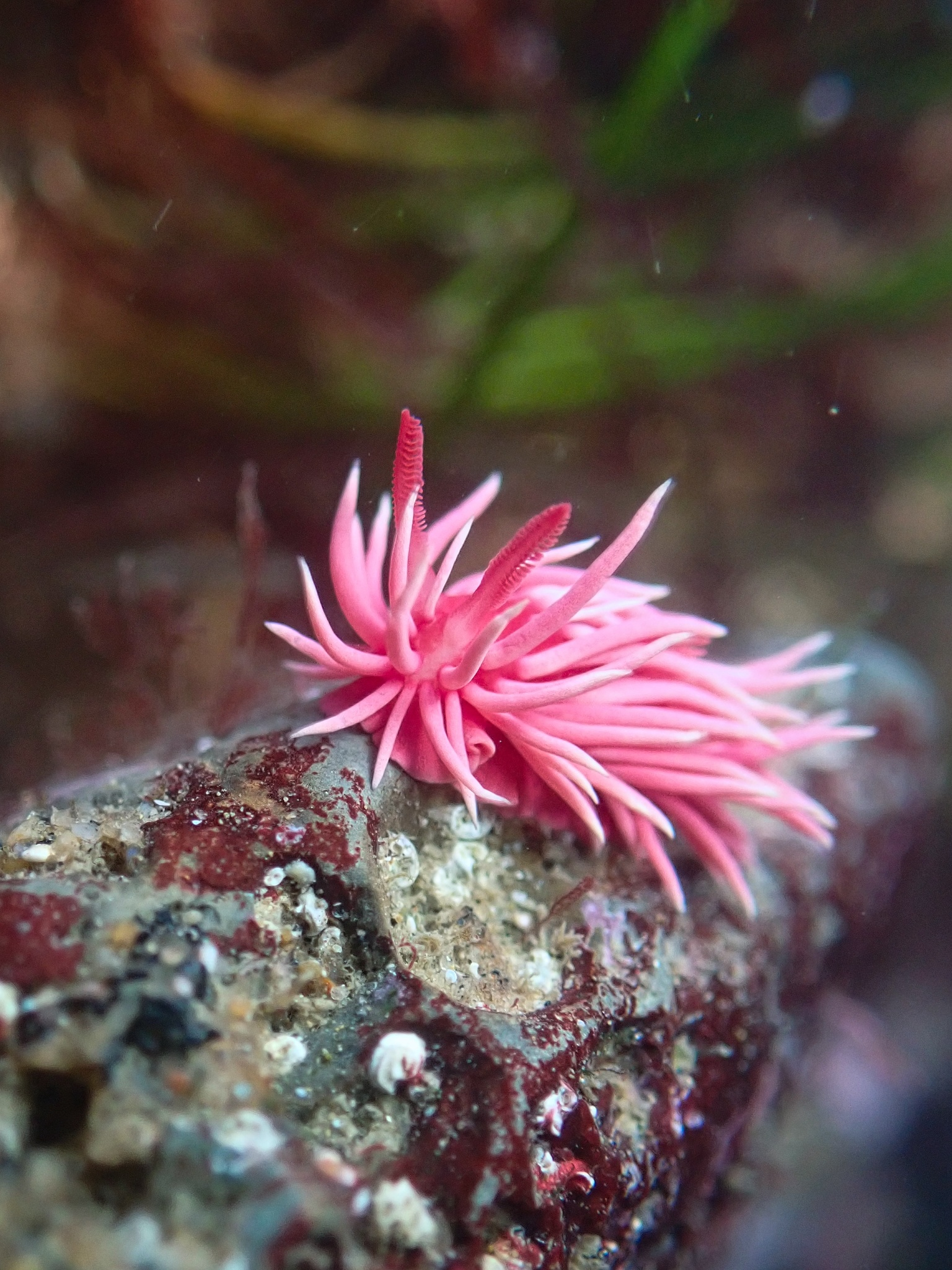
- Ceratodoris rosacea

Scientific classification
- Kingdom: Animalia
- Phylum: Mollusca
- Class: Gastropoda
- Order: Nudibranchia
- Family: Goniodorididae
- Subfamily: Goniodorinae
- Genus: Ceratodoris; J. E. Gray, 1850

Type species
- Doris eolida Quoy & Gaimard, 1832

Synonyms
- Echinodoris Bergh, 1974; Hopkinsia MacFarland, 1905; Hopkinsiella Baba, 1938; Sakishimaia Hamatani, 2001; Teshia Edmunds, 1966

= Ceratodoris =

Genus of gastropods

Ceratodoris genus of sea slugs, specifically dorid nudibranchs, marine gastropod molluscs in the subfamily Goniodoridinae in the family Goniodorididae.

Formerly synonymized with Okenia, it was recovered in 2024 in a revision of Goniodorid taxonomy.

== Species ==
- Ceratodoris africana (Edmunds, 2009)
- Ceratodoris atkinsonorum (Rudman, 2007)
- Ceratodoris barnardi (Baba, 1937)
- Ceratodoris digitata (Edmunds, 1966)
- Ceratodoris elisae (Paz-Sedano & Pola, 2021)
- Ceratodoris eolida (Quoy & Gaimard, 1832)
- Ceratodoris hallucigenia (Rudman, 2004)
- Ceratodoris hiroi (Baba, 1938)
- Ceratodoris kendi (Gosliner, 2004)
- Ceratodoris kondoi (Hamatani, 2001)
- Ceratodoris lambat (Gosliner, 2004)
- Ceratodoris mellita (Rudman, 2004)
- Ceratodoris nakamotoensis (Hamatani, 2001)
- Ceratodoris nakanoae (Paz-Sedano & Pola, 2021)
- Ceratodoris pilosa (Bouchet & Ortea, 1983)
- Ceratodoris plana (Baba, 1960)
- Ceratodoris plebeia (Bergh, 1902)
- Ceratodoris rosacea (MacFarland, 1905)
- Ceratodoris sapelona (Ev. Marcus & Er. Marcus, 1967)
- Ceratodoris stellata (Rudman, 2004)
- Ceratodoris tenuifibrata (Paz-Sedano & Pola, 2021)
- Ceratodoris trypomandyas Paz-Sedano, Cobb, Gosliner & Pola, 2024
- Ceratodoris vancouverensis (O'Donoghue, 1921)
- Ceratodoris virginiae (Gosliner, 2004)
