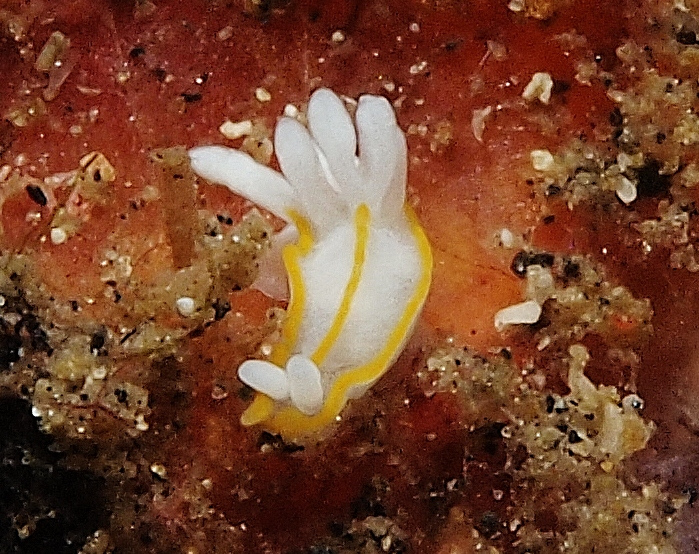
- Goniodoridella savignyi

Scientific classification
- Kingdom: Animalia
- Phylum: Mollusca
- Class: Gastropoda
- Order: Nudibranchia
- Family: Goniodorididae
- Genus: Goniodoridella; Pruvot-Fol, 1933

Type species
- Goniodoridella savignyi Pruvot-Fol, 1933

Synonyms
- Goniodoris Pruvot-Fol, 1933

= Goniodoridella =

Genus of gastropods

Goniodoridella is a genus of sea slugs, specifically dorid nudibranchs, marine gastropod molluscs in the subfamily Goniodoridinae in the family Goniodorididae.

== Species ==
Species within the genus Goniodoris include:

- Goniodoridella borealis Martynov, Sanamyan & Korshunova, 2015
- Goniodoridella cochimi (Gosliner & Bertsch, 2004)
- Goniodoridella felis (Gosliner, 2010)
- Goniodoridella geminae Paz-Sedano, Ekimova, Smirnoff, Gosliner & Pola, 2023
- Goniodoridella mexicorum (Gosliner & Bertsch, 2004)
- Goniodoridella miramarae (Ortea & Espinosa, 2000)
- Goniodoridella picoensis (Paz-Sedano, Ortigosa & Pola, 2017)
- Goniodoridella savignyi Pruvot-Fol, 1933
- Goniodoridella serrata Paz-Sedano, Ekimova, Smirnoff, Gosliner & Pola, 2023
- Goniodoridella unidonta Paz-Sedano, Ekimova, Smirnoff, Gosliner & Pola, 2023
