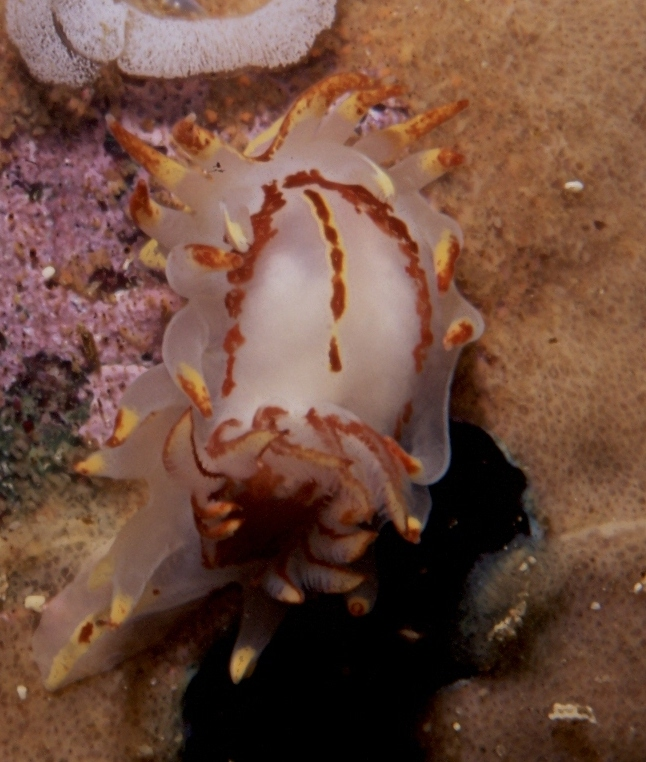

Scientific classification
- Kingdom: Animalia
- Phylum: Mollusca
- Class: Gastropoda
- Order: Nudibranchia
- Family: Goniodorididae
- Genus: Okenia
- Species: O. amoenula

Binomial name
- Okenia amoenula (Bergh, 1907)

= Okenia amoenula =

Fiery nudibranch Okenia amoenula

Species of gastropod

The fiery nudibranch, Okenia amoenula, is a species of colourful sea slug, specifically a dorid nudibranch, a marine gastropod mollusc in the family Goniodorididae.

== Distribution ==
This species is endemic to the South African coast and is found from the Atlantic coast of the Cape Peninsula to Port Elizabeth intertidally to at least 30 m. It has also been reported from Angola.

== Description ==
The fiery nudibranch is a small (up to 20 mm) smooth-bodied nudibranch which is often overlooked until its egg ribbons are seen. It is then often noticed in groups. It has a pale body streaked with orange and a margin characterised by yellow-orange tipped fingerlike projections which resemble flames. The rhinophores are white and the gills are orange-striped.

== Ecology ==
The fiery nudibranch is often found on bryozoans. Its egg mass is a sprawling white curl of several turns.

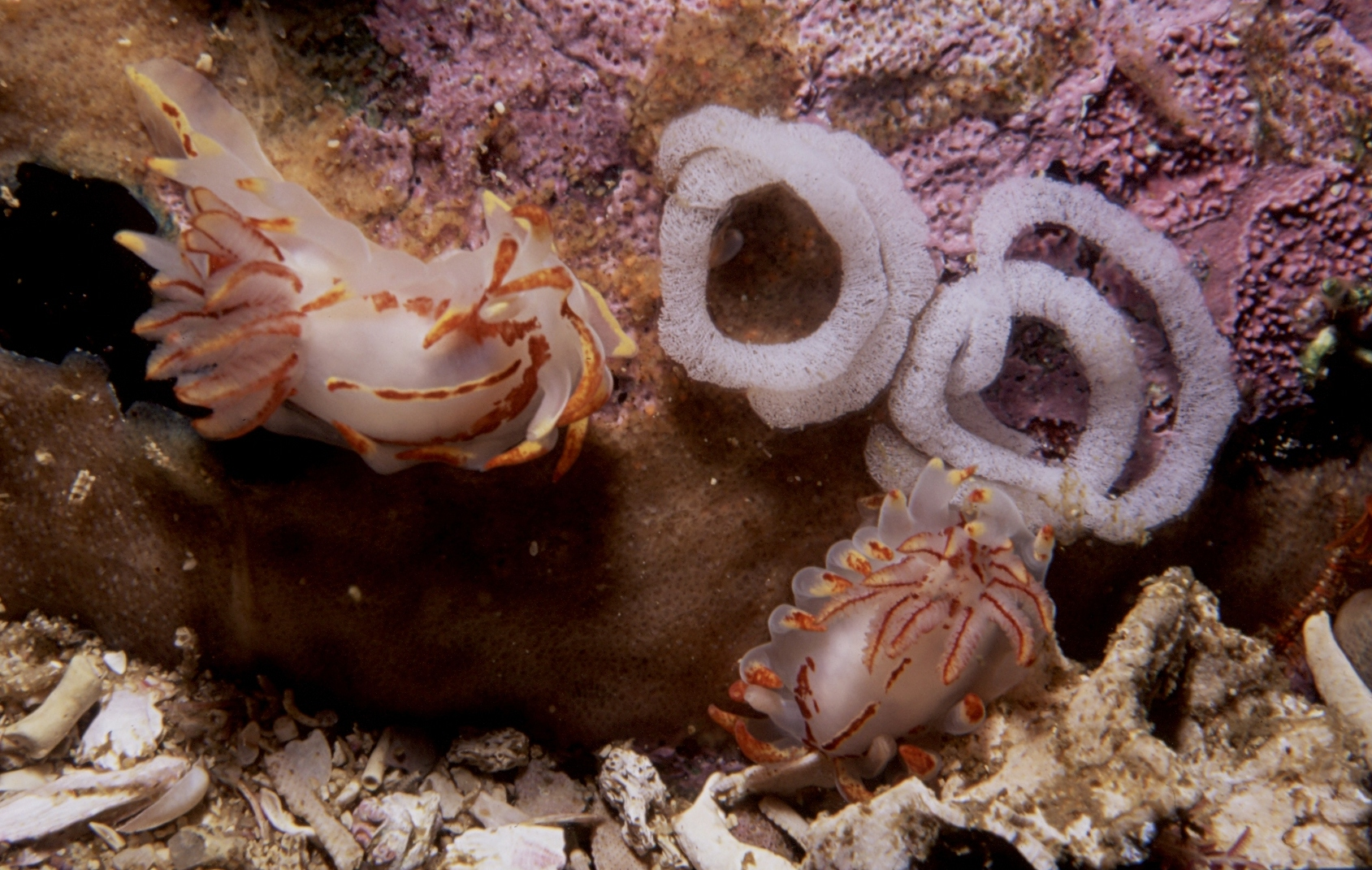
Two fiery nudibranchs with their egg ribbons
