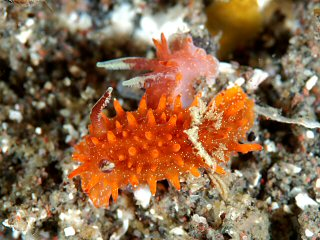

Scientific classification
- Kingdom: Animalia
- Phylum: Mollusca
- Class: Gastropoda
- Order: Nudibranchia
- Family: Goniodorididae
- Genus: Okenia
- Species: O. echinata

Binomial name
- Okenia echinata Baba, 1949

= Okenia echinata =

Species of gastropod

Okenia echinata is a species of sea slug, specifically a dorid nudibranch, a marine gastropod mollusc in the family Goniodorididae.

== Distribution ==
This species was described from Sagami Bay, Japan. Similar looking animals have been reported from Australia and India.

== Description ==
This Okenia has a broad body and many short, triangular, pointed, lateral papillae. There are scattered, shorter, papillae on the back, between the rhinophores and the gills and in front of the rhinophores. The body is described as uniformly brown with small spots of white pigment. Recent finds from Japan show body colour is variable through red to orange and the papillae have orange tips.

== Ecology ==
The diet of this species is probably a ctenostome bryozoan.
