= Okenia ameliae =

Scientific classification
- Kingdom: Animalia
- Phylum: Mollusca
- Class: Gastropoda
- Order: Nudibranchia
- Family: Goniodorididae
- Genus: Okenia
- Species: O. ameliae

Binomial name
- Okenia ameliae Ortea, Moro & Caballer, 2014

Species of gastropod

Okenia ameliae is a species of sea slug, specifically a dorid nudibranch, a marine gastropod mollusc in the family Goniodorididae.

== Distribution ==
This species was described from the Canary Islands.
