= Okenia angelica =

Scientific classification
- Kingdom: Animalia
- Phylum: Mollusca
- Class: Gastropoda
- Order: Nudibranchia
- Family: Goniodorididae
- Genus: Okenia
- Species: O. angelica

Binomial name
- Okenia angelica Gosliner & Bertsch, 2004

Species of gastropod

Okenia angelica is a species of sea slug, specifically a dorid nudibranch, a marine gastropod mollusc in the family Goniodorididae.

== Distribution ==
This species was described from Bahía de los Ángeles, Baja California with additional specimens from Isla Cedros on the Pacific Ocean coast of Baja California and Bahía de Banderas, Jalisco, Mexico.

== Description ==
This Okenia has a broad body and seven to nine pairs of curved lateral papillae. The body is brown grading to purple with an opaque white patch covering most of the back. In front of the gills there are raised purple spots surrounded by orange-brown pigment within an area of pale brown. The papillae and rhinophores may be tipped with light orange pigment.

== Ecology ==
The diet of this species is probably an encrusting bryozoan.
