= O. digitata =

O. digitata may refer to:

- Okenia digitata, a species of sea slug, specifically a dorid nudibranch, a marine gastropod mollusc in the family Goniodorididae
- Onebala digitata or Helcystogramma septella, a moth in the family Gelechiidae
- Ophioglossolambis digitata, a species of sea snail, a marine gastropod mollusk in the true conch family, Strombidae
