= Bermudella =

- Bermudella angelensis

Scientific classification
- Kingdom: Animalia
- Phylum: Mollusca
- Class: Gastropoda
- Order: Nudibranchia
- Family: Goniodorididae
- Subfamily: Goniodoridinae
- Genus: Bermudella; Odhner, 1941

Type species
- Polycerella zoobotryon Smallwood, 1910

Genus of gastropods

Bermudella is a genus of sea slugs, marine gastropod molluscs, in the subfamily Goniodoridinae in the family Goniodorididae.

Formerly synonymized with Okenia, it was reinstated in 2024 in a revision of Goniodorid taxonomy.

== Taxonomy ==
Species currently within Bermudella include:

- Bermudella angelensis (Lance, 1966)
- Bermudella brunneomaculata (Gosliner, 2004)
- Bermudella distincta (Baba, 1940)
- Bermudella evelinae (Er. Marcus, 1957)
- Bermudella harastii (Pola, Roldán & Padilla, 2014)
- Bermudella japonica (Baba, 1949)
- Bermudella lahainensis Paz-Sedano, Cobb, Gosliner & Pola, 2024
- Bermudella mica (Ortea & Moro, 2014)
- Bermudella mija (Burn, 1967)
- Bermudella pellucida (Burn, 1967)
- Bermudella polycerelloides Ortea & Bouchet, 1983
- Bermudella purpurata (Rudman, 2004)
- Bermudella purpureolineata (Gosliner, 2004)
- Bermudella siderata (Paz-Sedano & Pola, 2021)
- Bermudella vena (Rudman, 2004)
- Bermudella zoobotryon (Smallwood, 1910)

Synonyms include:

- Bermudella longiductis (Pola, Paz-Sedano, Macali, Minchin, Marchini, Vitale, Licchelli & Crocetta, 2019): synonym of Bermudella polycerelloides Ortea & Bouchet, 1983
