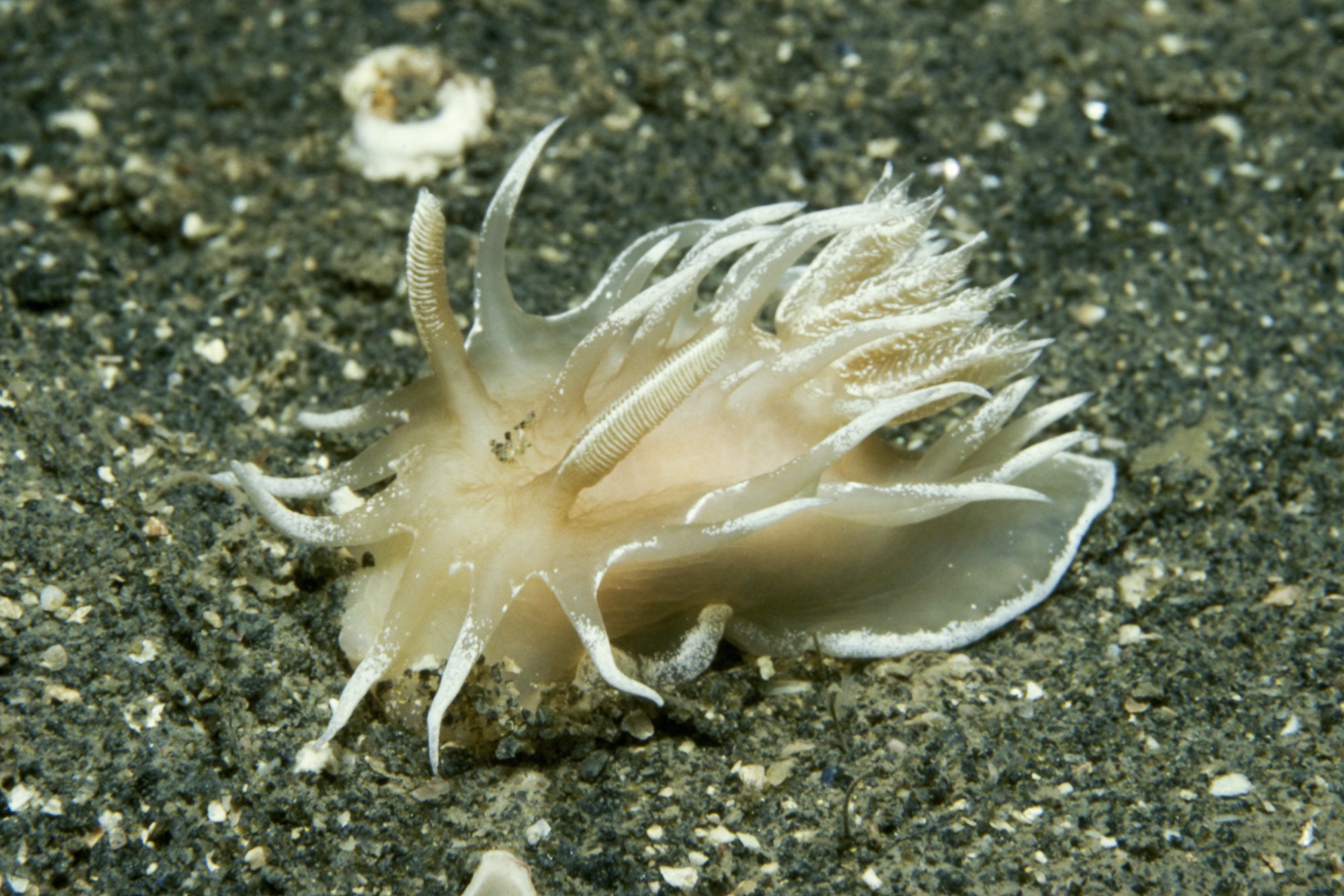

Scientific classification
- Kingdom: Animalia
- Phylum: Mollusca
- Class: Gastropoda
- Order: Nudibranchia
- Family: Goniodorididae
- Genus: Okenia
- Species: O. leachii

Binomial name
- Okenia leachii (Alder & Hancock, 1855)

= Okenia leachii =

Species of gastropod

Okenia leachii is a species of sea slug, a dorid nudibranch, a marine gastropod mollusc in the family Goniodorididae.

== Distribution ==
This species was first described from Whitburn, North Sea with additional specimens from the Hebrides and Torbay.

== Description ==
This goniodorid nudibranch is translucent white in colour, with brilliant white pigment on the pallial tentacles, rhinophores and gills.

== Ecology ==
Okenia leachii probably feeds on tunicates such as Molgula occulta, family Molgulidae which live buried in muddy sand seabeds.
