= Okenia rhinorma =

Scientific classification
- Kingdom: Animalia
- Phylum: Mollusca
- Class: Gastropoda
- Order: Nudibranchia
- Family: Goniodorididae
- Genus: Okenia
- Species: O. rhinorma

Binomial name
- Okenia rhinorma Rudman, 2007

Species of gastropod

Okenia rhinorma is a species of sea slug, specifically a dorid nudibranch, a marine gastropod mollusc in the family Goniodorididae.

== Distribution ==
This species was described from Dar es Salaam, Tanzania.

== Description ==
This Okenia has very large rhinophores. It is mostly opaque white, with lines and patches of purple and orange.

== Ecology ==
The diet of this species is unknown but probably consists of tunicates.
