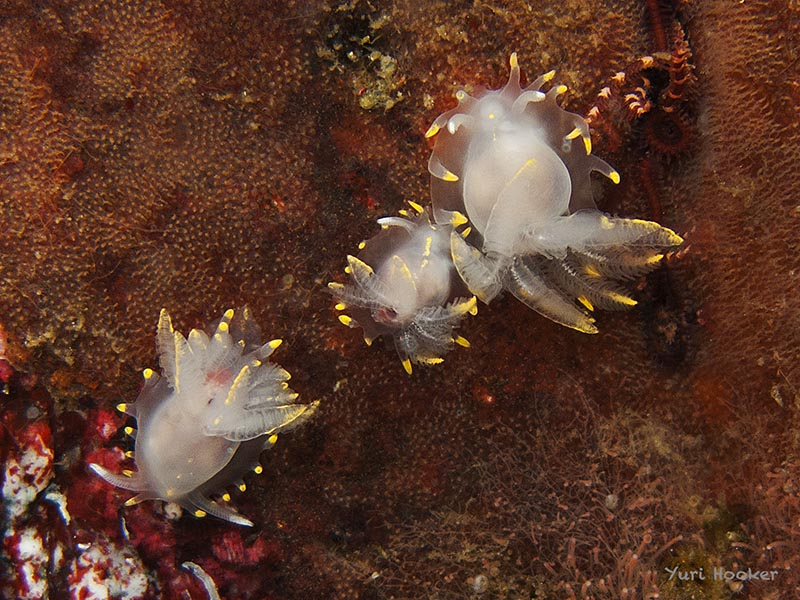
- The nudibranchs Okenia luna on their food bryozoan.

Scientific classification
- Kingdom: Animalia
- Phylum: Mollusca
- Class: Gastropoda
- Order: Nudibranchia
- Family: Goniodorididae
- Genus: Okenia
- Species: O. luna

Binomial name
- Okenia luna Millen, Schrödl, Vargas & Indacochea, 1994

= Okenia luna =

Species of gastropod

Okenia luna is a species of sea slug, specifically a dorid nudibranch, a marine gastropod mollusc in the family Goniodorididae.

== Distribution ==
This species was described from Bahia of Ancón Peru. Is distributed from Ancon, Lima Peru to Coliumo, Chile

== Description ==
This Okenia has a broad body and seven to twelve pairs of lateral papillae.

== Ecology ==
The diet of this species is a bryozoan, Alcyonidium nodosum.
