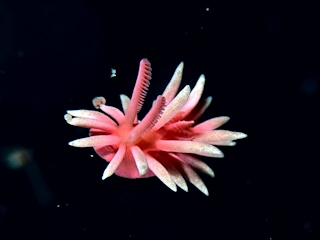

Scientific classification
- Kingdom: Animalia
- Phylum: Mollusca
- Class: Gastropoda
- Order: Nudibranchia
- Family: Goniodorididae
- Genus: Ceratodoris
- Species: C. hiroi

Binomial name
- Ceratodoris hiroi (Baba, 1938)

Synonyms
- Hopkinsia hiroi (Baba, 1938); Hopkinsiella hiroi Baba, 1938; Okenia hiroi (Baba, 1938)

= Ceratodoris hiroi =

Species of gastropod

Ceratodoris hiroi is a species of sea slug, specifically a dorid nudibranch, a marine gastropod mollusc in the subfamily Goniodoridinae in the family Goniodorididae.

== Distribution ==
This species was described from the Kii Peninsula, Japan. It has also been found in Korea and Hong Kong.

== Description ==
This Ceratodoris has a broad flattened body and about nine elongate lateral papillae on each side of the mantle. These papillae are irregularly arranged and crowded and there are additional papillae arising from the back. The colour is bright pink with the papillae tipped with white or almost entirely white. It is similar in shape, colour and diet to Okenia rosacea from the Pacific coast of America.

== Ecology ==
The diet of this species is the bryozoan Integripelta acanthus.
