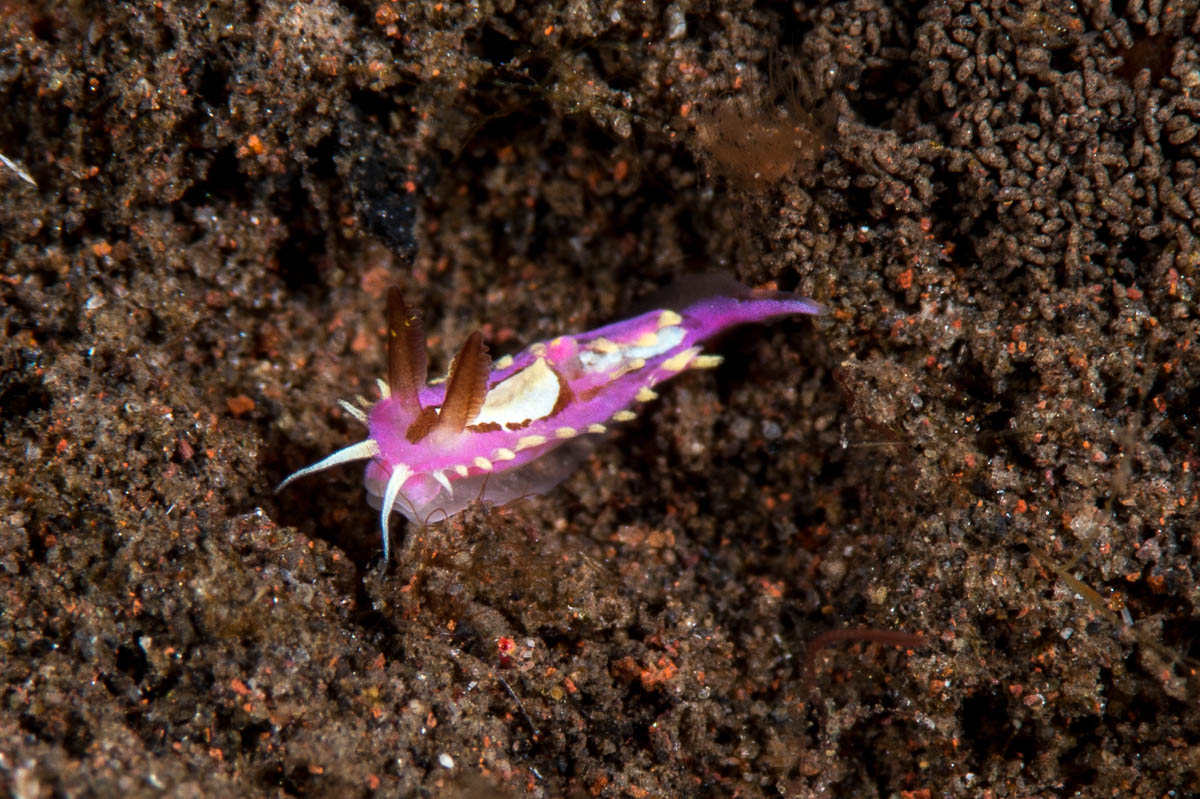
- Naisdoris vitiligata

Scientific classification
- Kingdom: Animalia
- Phylum: Mollusca
- Class: Gastropoda
- Order: Nudibranchia
- Family: Goniodorididae
- Subfamily: Goniodoridinae
- Genus: Naisdoris; Paz-Sedano, Moles, Smirnoff, Gosliner & Pola, 2024

Type species
- Okenia liklik Gosliner, 2004

= Naisdoris =

Genus of gastropods

Naisdoris is a genus of sea slugs, marine gastropod molluscs, in the subfamily Goniodoridinae in the family Goniodorididae.

== Species ==
Species with Naisdoris include:

- Naisdoris aurornata Paz-Sedano, Cobb, Gosliner & Pola, 2024
- Naisdoris labalsaensis Paz-Sedano, Cobb, Gosliner & Pola, 2024
- Naisdoris liklik (Gosliner, 2004)
- Naisdoris vitiligata Paz-Sedano, Cobb, Gosliner & Pola, 2024
