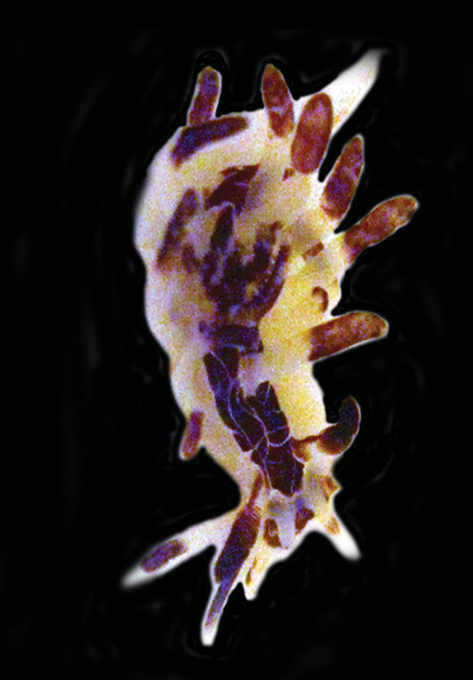
- Ceratodoris virginiae

Scientific classification
- Kingdom: Animalia
- Phylum: Mollusca
- Class: Gastropoda
- Order: Nudibranchia
- Family: Goniodorididae
- Genus: Ceratodoris
- Species: C. virginiae

Binomial name
- Ceratodoris virginiae (Gosliner, 2004)

Synonyms
- Okenia virginiae Gosliner, 2004

= Ceratodoris virginiae =

Species of gastropod

Ceratodoris virginiae is a species of sea slug, specifically a dorid nudibranch, a marine gastropod mollusc in the subfamily Goniodoridinae in the family Goniodorididae.

== Distribution ==
This species was described from Vetchies Pier, Durban, South Africa.
