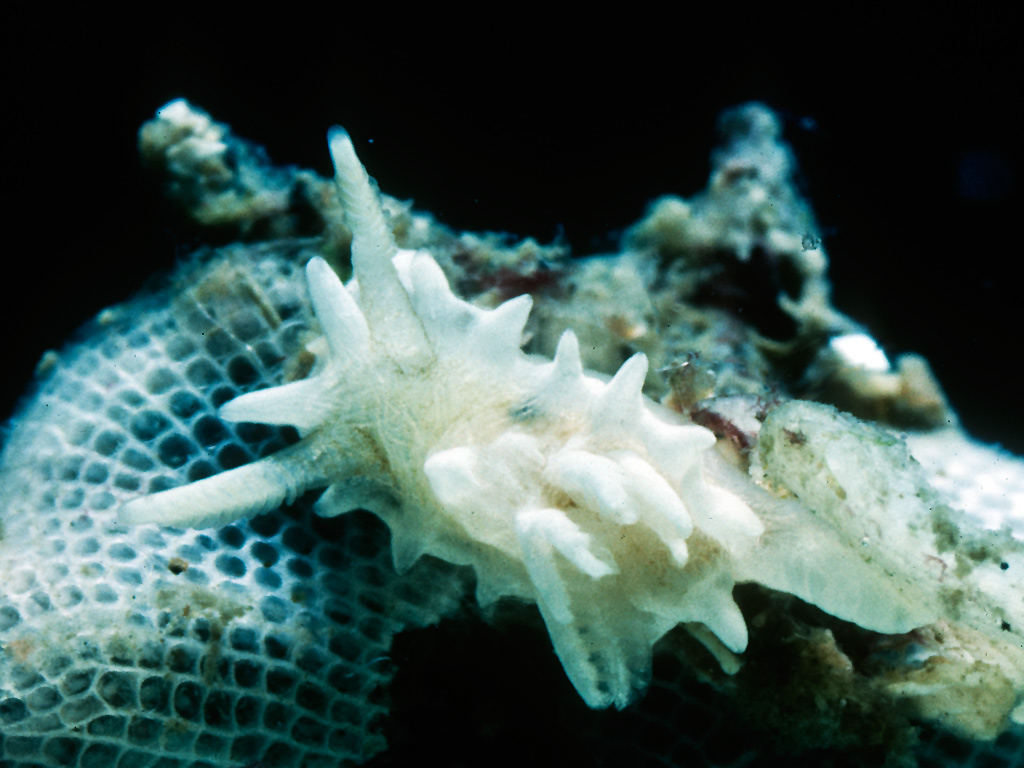
- The nudibranch Bermudella japonica, Mirs Bay, Hong Kong.

Scientific classification
- Kingdom: Animalia
- Phylum: Mollusca
- Class: Gastropoda
- Order: Nudibranchia
- Family: Goniodorididae
- Subfamily: Goniodoridinae
- Genus: Bermudella
- Species: B. japonica

Binomial name
- Bermudella japonica (Baba, 1949)

Synonyms
- Okenia japonica Baba, 1949

= Bermudella japonica =

Species of gastropod

Bermudella japonica is a species of sea slug, specifically a dorid nudibranch, a marine gastropod mollusc in the subfamily Goniodoridinae in the family Goniodorididae.

== Distribution ==
The species was described from Sagami Bay, Japan. It has also been found in Hong Kong.

== Description ==
This Bermudella has a flattened body and short lateral papillae on each side of the mantle. It is predominantly opaque white in colour.

== Ecology ==
The species feeds on bryozoans.
