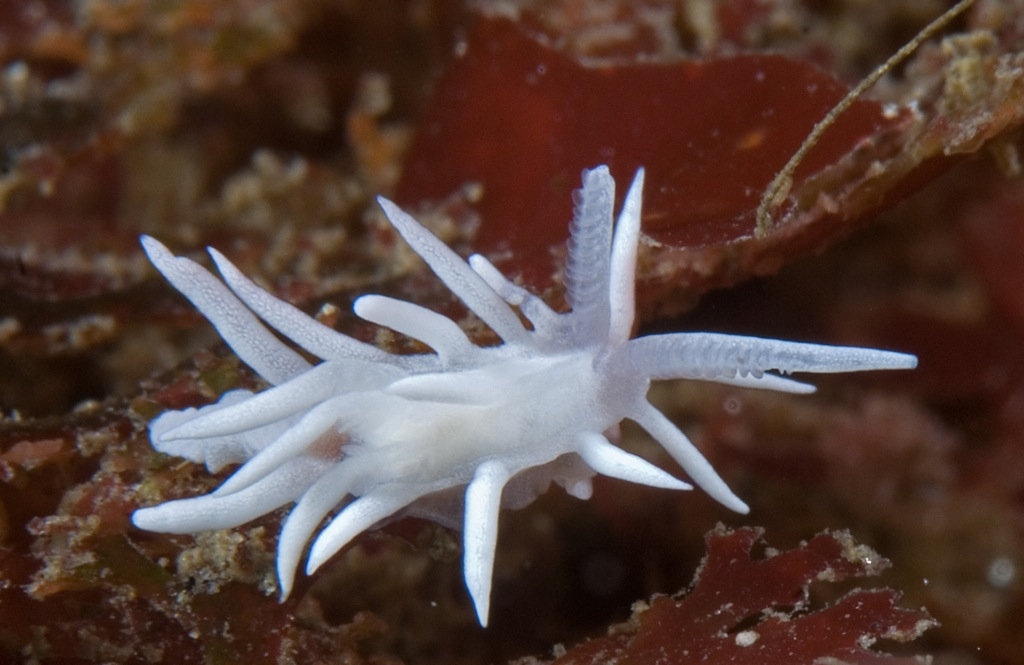

Scientific classification
- Kingdom: Animalia
- Phylum: Mollusca
- Class: Gastropoda
- Order: Nudibranchia
- Family: Goniodorididae
- Genus: Goniodoridella
- Species: G. felis

Binomial name
- Goniodoridella felis (Gosliner, 2010)

Synonyms
- Okenia felis Gosliner, 2010

= Goniodoridella felis =

Species of gastropod

Goniodoridella felis is a species of very small sea slug, specifically a dorid nudibranch, a marine gastropod mollusc in the subfamily Goniodoridinae in the family Goniodorididae. This species was first discovered in 2008 at Point Lobos State Reserve, in Monterey County, California, by local divers. It was named and described in 2010.

== Distribution ==
This species has so far been observed only in Carmel-by-the-Sea, California at 37–45 m depth.

== Description ==
This Goniodoridella is translucent white in color, with white flecks covering the body. The rhinophores are distinctive in that the ends are void of lamellae. The gill is made up of three branches. Reaching only about 7–8 mm in length, this deeper water species feeds on brown ctenostomatous bryozoans.
