= Goniodoridella miramarae =

Scientific classification
- Kingdom: Animalia
- Phylum: Mollusca
- Class: Gastropoda
- Order: Nudibranchia
- Family: Goniodorididae
- Genus: Goniodoridella
- Species: G. miramarae

Binomial name
- Goniodoridella miramarae (Ortea & Espinosa, 2000)

Synonyms
- Okenia miramarae Ortea & Espinosa, 2000

Species of gastropod

Goniodoridella miramarae is a species of sea slug, specifically a dorid nudibranch, a marine gastropod mollusc in the subfamily Goniodoridinae in the family Goniodorididae.

== Distribution ==
This species was described from Cuba, Caribbean Sea. It has been reported and illustrated with photographs from Gran Canaria, Canary Islands.

== Description ==
The maximum recorded body length is 5 mm.

== Habitat ==
Minimum recorded depth is 20 m. Maximum recorded depth is 20 m.
