= Cargoa cupella =

Scientific classification
- Kingdom: Animalia
- Phylum: Mollusca
- Class: Gastropoda
- Order: Nudibranchia
- Family: Goniodorididae
- Subfamily: Goniodoridinae
- Genus: Cargoa
- Species: C. cupella

Binomial name
- Cargoa cupella (Vogel & Schultz, 1970)

Synonyms
- Okenia cupella (Vogel & L. P. Schultz, 1970)

Species of gastropod

Cargoa cupella is a species of sea slug, specifically a dorid nudibranch, a marine gastropod mollusc in the subfamily Goniodoridinae in the family Goniodorididae.

It is the type species of Cargoa.

== Distribution ==
This species was described from Chesapeake Bay, United States.
