= Cargoa ghanensis =

Scientific classification
- Kingdom: Animalia
- Phylum: Mollusca
- Class: Gastropoda
- Order: Nudibranchia
- Family: Goniodorididae
- Subfamily: Goniodoridinae
- Genus: Cargoa
- Species: C. ghanensis

Binomial name
- Cargoa ghanensis Edmunds, 2009

Species of gastropod

Okenia ghanensis is a species of sea slug, specifically a dorid nudibranch, a marine gastropod mollusc in the subfamily Goniodoridinae in the family Goniodorididae.

== Distribution ==
This species was described from Ghana.
