= Bermudella evelinae =

Scientific classification
- Kingdom: Animalia
- Phylum: Mollusca
- Class: Gastropoda
- Order: Nudibranchia
- Family: Goniodorididae
- Subfamily: Goniodoridinae
- Genus: Bermudella
- Species: B. evelinae

Binomial name
- Bermudella evelinae Marcus, 1957

Synonyms
- Okenia evelinae Er. Marcus, 1957

Species of gastropod

Bermudella evelinae is a species of sea slug, specifically a dorid nudibranch, a marine gastropod mollusc in the subfamily Goniodoridinae in the family Goniodorididae.

== Distribution ==
This species was described from Ubatuba, Brazil. It has been reported from Brazil to Lake Worth Lagoon, Florida.

== Description ==
This Bermudella has a narrow body and six pairs of short lateral papillae. There are two papillae on the mid-line of the back and two more on either side of the papilla which is just in front of the gills. The body is translucent white with opaque white spots. The bases of the rhinophores are brown and this pigment may form an indistinct line down both sides of the back and tail.

The maximum recorded body length is 8 mm.

== Habitat ==
Minimum recorded depth is 0 m. Maximum recorded depth is 0 m.

== Feeding habits ==
The diet of this species is the ctenostome bryozoan, Amathia distans Busk, 1886.
