= Ceratodoris mellita =

Scientific classification
- Kingdom: Animalia
- Phylum: Mollusca
- Class: Gastropoda
- Order: Nudibranchia
- Family: Goniodorididae
- Genus: Ceratodoris
- Species: C. mellita

Binomial name
- Ceratodoris mellita (Rudman, 2004)

Species of gastropod

Ceratodoris mellita is a species of sea slug, specifically a dorid nudibranch, a marine gastropod mollusc in the subfamily Goniodoridinae in the family Goniodorididae.

== Distribution ==
This species was described from New South Wales, Australia. It is known only from eastern Australia.

== Description ==
This Ceratodoris has a narrow body and five lateral papillae on each side. The body is bright orange and the tips of the mantle processes and the rhinophores are black.

== Ecology ==
The diet of this species is unknown but is probably a bryozoan.
