= Ceratodoris africana =

Scientific classification
- Kingdom: Animalia
- Phylum: Mollusca
- Class: Gastropoda
- Order: Nudibranchia
- Family: Goniodorididae
- Genus: Ceratodoris
- Species: C. africana

Binomial name
- Ceratodoris africana (Edmunds, 2009)

Synonyms
- Okenia africana Edmunds, 2009

Species of gastropod

Ceratodoris africana is a species of sea slug, specifically a dorid nudibranch, a marine gastropod mollusc in the subfamily Goniodoridinae in the family Goniodorididae.

== Distribution ==
This species was described from Ghana.
