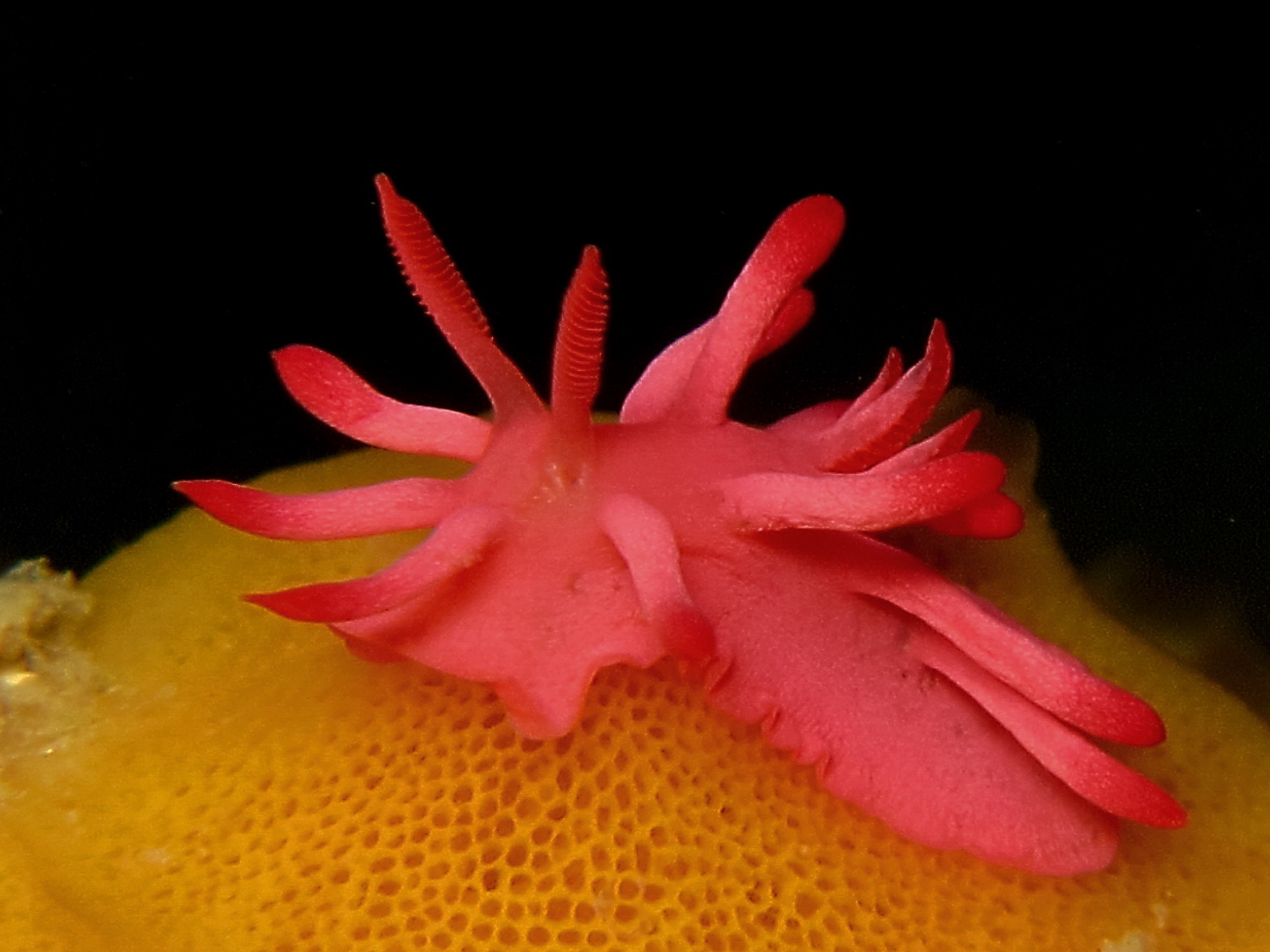
- Ceratodoris atkinsonorum, Nelson Bay NSW, head end towards the left

Scientific classification
- Kingdom: Animalia
- Phylum: Mollusca
- Class: Gastropoda
- Order: Nudibranchia
- Family: Goniodorididae
- Genus: Ceratodoris
- Species: C. atkinsonorum

Binomial name
- Ceratodoris atkinsonorum (Rudman, 2007)

Synonyms
- Okenia atkinsonorum Rudman, 2007

= Ceratodoris atkinsonorum =

Species of gastropod

Ceratodoris atkinsonorum is a species of colourful sea slug, specifically a dorid nudibranch, a marine gastropod mollusc in the family Goniodorididae.

C. atkinsonorum upon some sea squirts.

== Distribution ==
This species is known from New South Wales, southeastern Australia and probably also from Northern New Zealand.

== Description ==
This brightly coloured species is completely pink. Only the tips of the mantle projections, rhinophores and gills have a darker shade of the same color. It does not have a traditionally shaped mantle, but instead has up to seven lateral appendages or papillae that protrude from the main body.

== Ecology ==
This species feeds on the bryozoan Pleurotoichus clathratus.
