= Goniodoridella mexicorum =

Scientific classification
- Kingdom: Animalia
- Phylum: Mollusca
- Class: Gastropoda
- Order: Nudibranchia
- Family: Goniodorididae
- Genus: Goniodoridella
- Species: G. mexicorum

Binomial name
- Goniodoridella mexicorum (Gosliner & Bertsch, 2004)

Synonyms
- Okenia mexicorum Gosliner & Bertsch, 2004

Species of gastropod

Goniodoridella mexicorum is a species of sea slug, specifically a dorid nudibranch, a marine gastropod mollusc in the subfamily Goniodoridinae in the family Goniodorididae.

== Distribution ==
This species was described from Jalisco, Mexico, and it is known to occur further north, as far as Baja California Sur.

== Description ==
This Goniodoridella has a narrow body and eight to ten pairs of short lateral papillae. There is a median ridge on the back, from which a single papilla arises just in front of the gills. The body is translucent white and the mantle is covered with opaque white pigment. The papillae are red and there are red patches on the sides of the foot.

== Ecology ==
The diet of this species is not known.
