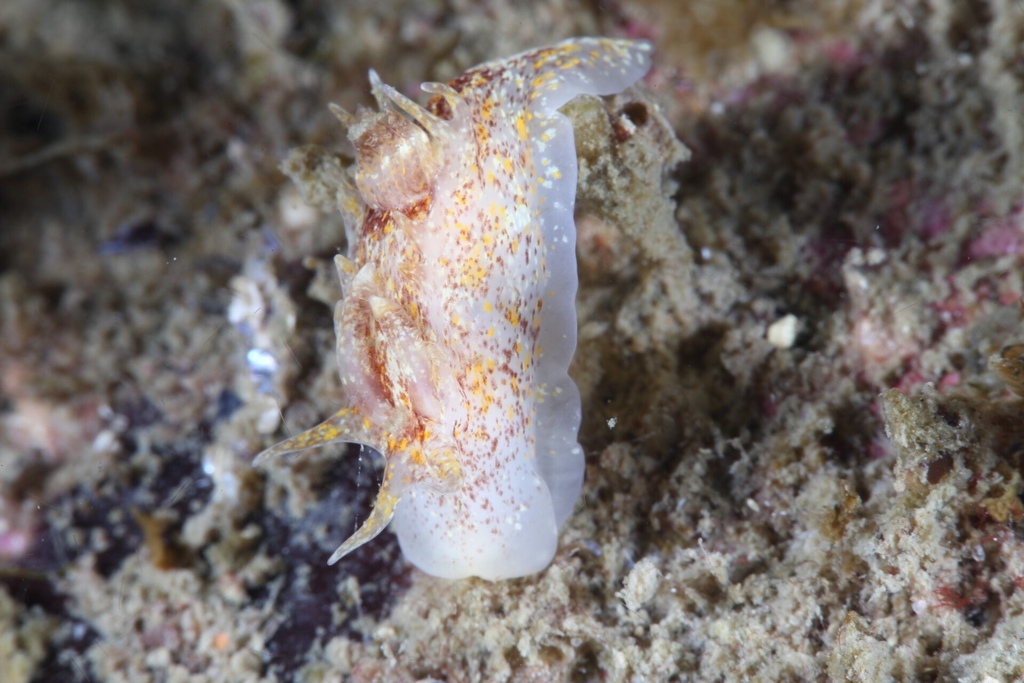

Scientific classification
- Kingdom: Animalia
- Phylum: Mollusca
- Class: Gastropoda
- Order: Nudibranchia
- Family: Goniodorididae
- Genus: Okenia
- Species: O. aspersa

Binomial name
- Okenia aspersa (Alder & Hancock, 1845)

Synonyms
- Doris quadricornis Montagu, 1813 (ICZN opinion 1014: suppressed under the plenary powers for the purpose of the Principle of Priority); Idalia aspersa Alder & Hancock, 1845 (original combination); Idalia caudata Orested, 1844; Idalia modesta Verrill, 1875; Idaliella modesta (A. E. Verrill, 1875); Okenia leachii var. quadricornis (Montagu, 1815); Okenia modesta (A. E. Verrill, 1875); Okenia quadricornis (Montagu, 1815) (suppressed under ICZN Opinion 1014)

= Okenia aspersa =

Species of gastropod

Okenia aspersa is a species of sea slug, a Dorid nudibranch, a marine gastropod mollusc in the family Goniodorididae.

== Distribution ==
This species was first described from Cullercoats, North Sea. It has subsequently been reported widely in Britain and Ireland and north to Norway and south to Arcachon Bay, France.

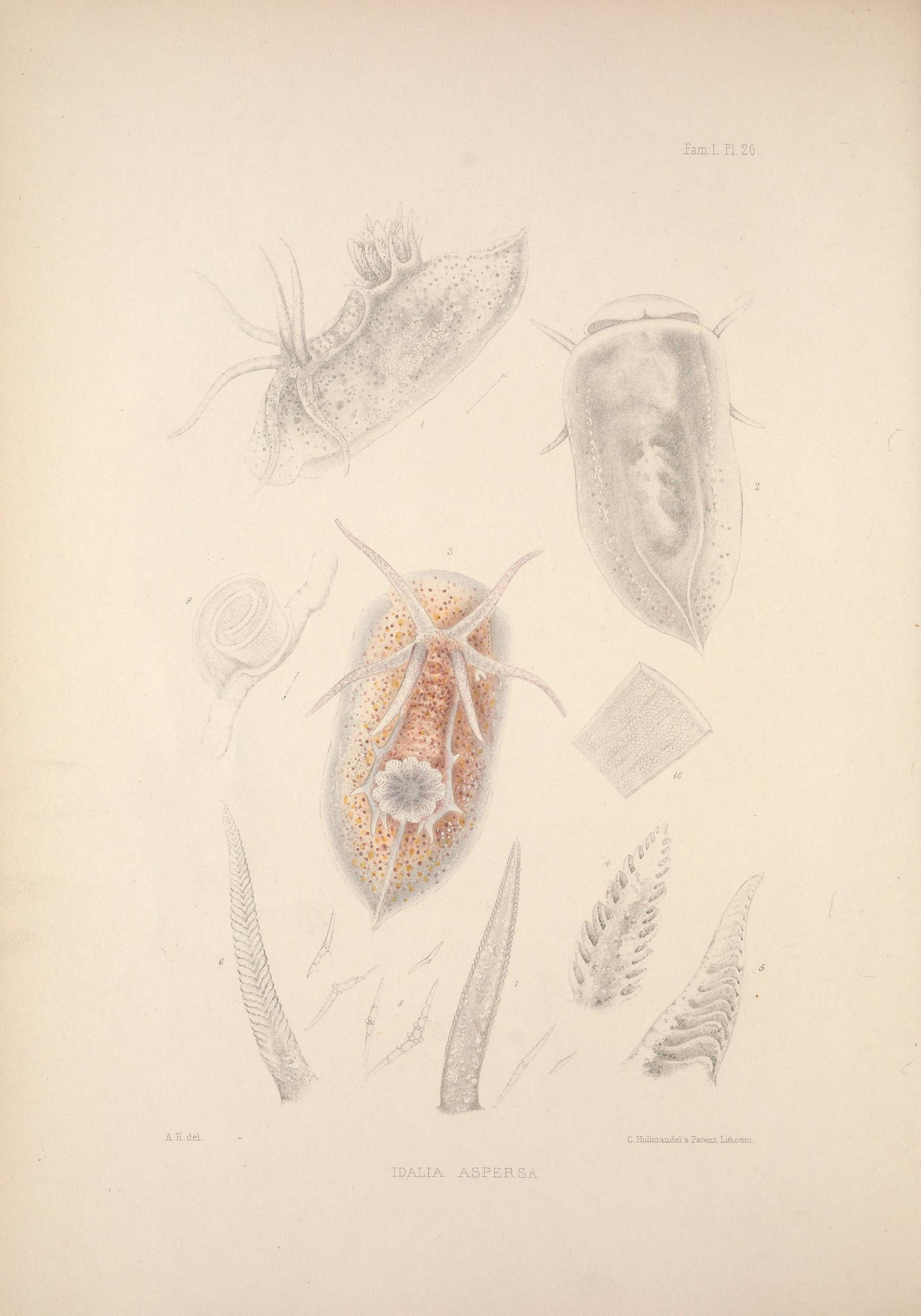
Okenia aspersa illustration accompanying the original description in A monograph of the British nudibranchiate Mollusca

== Description ==
This goniodorid nudibranch is translucent white in colour, with spots and blotches of red-brown and cream It shows marbling over the body, on the pallial tentacles, rhinophores and gills.

== Ecology ==
Okenia aspersa feeds on the tunicate Molgula occulta, family Molgulidae which lives buried in muddy sand seabeds.
