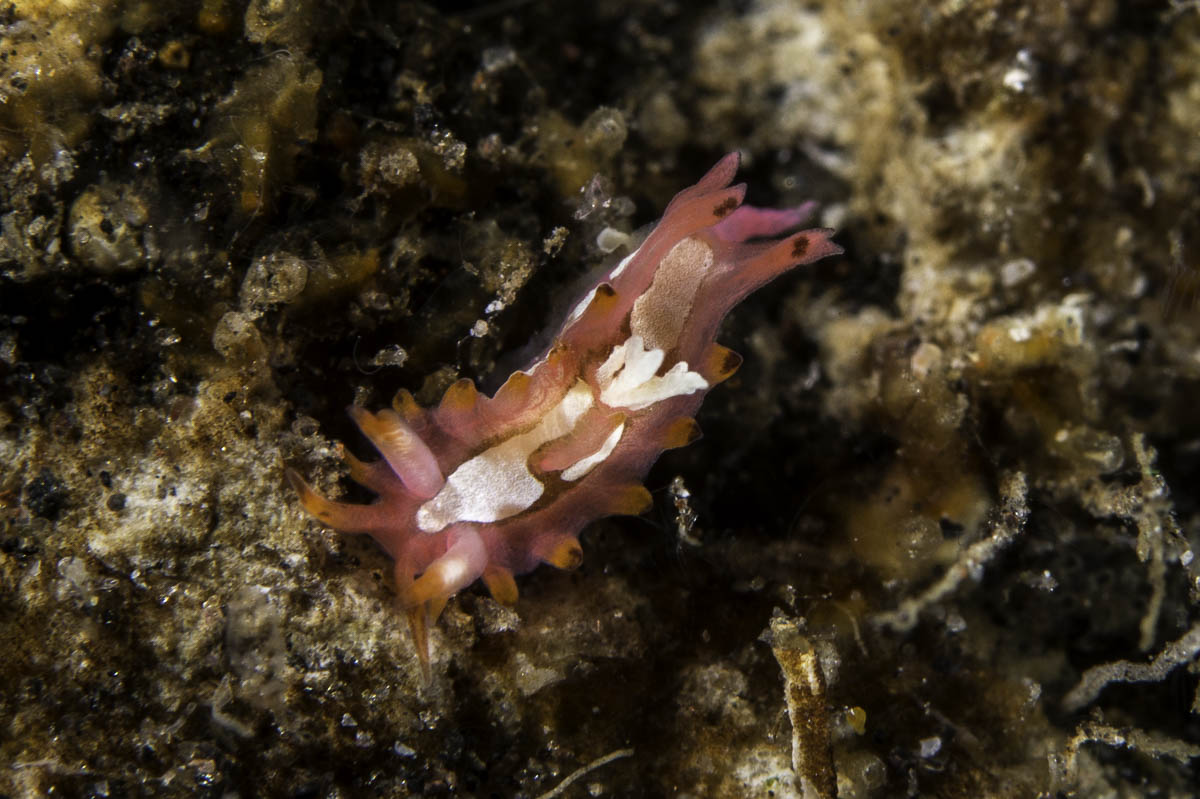
- The nudibranch Naisdoris liklik, The River, Tulamben, Bali.

Scientific classification
- Kingdom: Animalia
- Phylum: Mollusca
- Class: Gastropoda
- Order: Nudibranchia
- Family: Goniodorididae
- Subfamily: Goniodoridinae
- Genus: Naisdoris
- Species: N. liklik

Binomial name
- Naisdoris liklik (Gosliner, 2004)

Synonyms
- Okenia liklik Gosliner, 2004

= Naisdoris liklik =

Species of gastropod

Naisdoris liklik is a species of sea slug, specifically a dorid nudibranch, a marine gastropod mollusc in the subfamily Goniodoridinae in the family Goniodorididae.

== Distribution ==
This species was described from Luzon Island, Philippines and Papua New Guinea.

== Description ==
This Naisdoris has a broad body and eight or nine pairs of short lateral papillae. There is a crest composed of three or four short, partially fused, papillae on the back, in front of the gills. The body is translucent purple-pink and there is a broken white band which runs from between the rhinophores to the tail, encircling the back and gills. This band is broken and edged by brown patches and the dorsal crest is at its centre. There are two colour forms which may be different species. In the original description the papillae are orange with chocolate markings but in the other form they are tipped with white or pale yellow. The ridge of papillae in the middle of the back (dorsal crest) is pink in the original description, but white in the second colour form. The gills and rhinophores are also different in colour in the two forms.

== Ecology ==
The diet of this species is not known.
