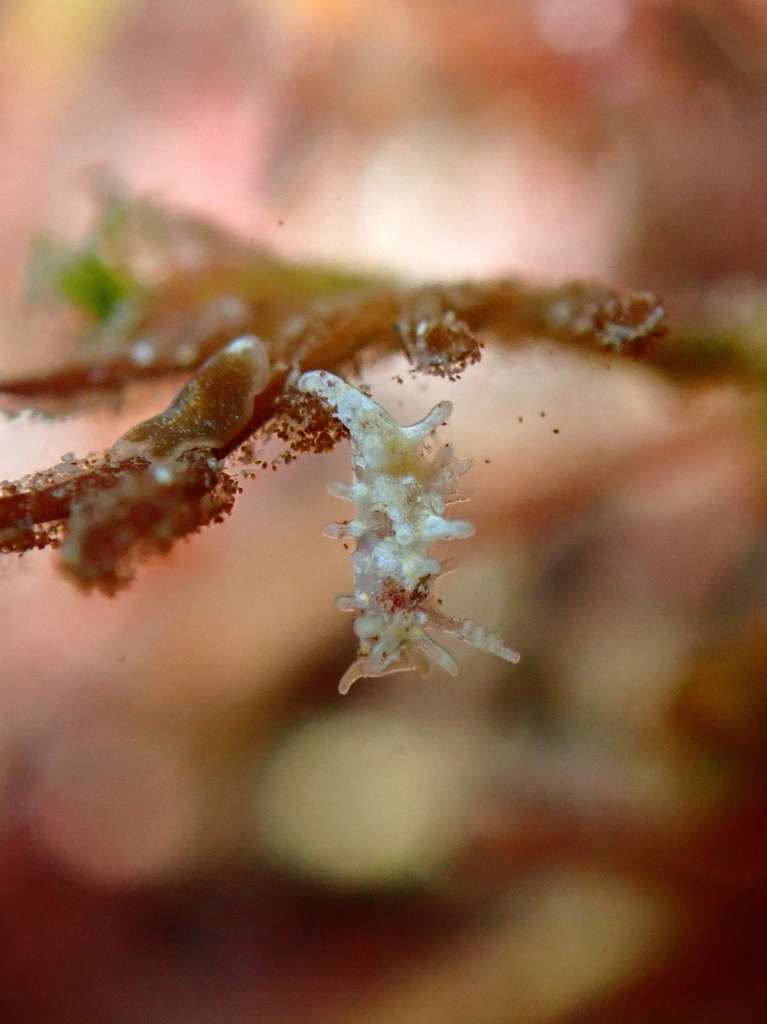

Scientific classification
- Kingdom: Animalia
- Phylum: Mollusca
- Class: Gastropoda
- Order: Nudibranchia
- Family: Goniodorididae
- Subfamily: Goniodoridinae
- Genus: Bermudella
- Species: B. mica

Binomial name
- Bermudella mica (Ortea & Moro, 2014)

Synonyms
- Okenia mica Burn, 1967

= Bermudella mica =

Species of gastropod

Bermudella mica is a species of sea slug, specifically a dorid nudibranch, a marine gastropod mollusc in the subfamily Goniodoridinae in the family Goniodorididae.

== Distribution ==
This species was described from the Canary Islands, Spain.
