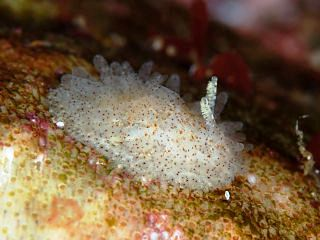

Scientific classification
- Kingdom: Animalia
- Phylum: Mollusca
- Class: Gastropoda
- Order: Nudibranchia
- Family: Goniodorididae
- Genus: Ceratodoris
- Species: C. pilosa

Binomial name
- Ceratodoris pilosa (Bouchet and Ortea, 1983)

Synonyms
- Hopkinsia pilosa Bouchet & Ortea, 1983; Okenia pilosa (Bouchet & Ortea, 1983)

= Ceratodoris pilosa =

Species of gastropod

Ceratodoris pilosa is a species of sea slug, specifically a dorid nudibranch, a marine gastropod mollusc in the subfamily Goniodoridinae in the family Goniodorididae.

== Distribution ==
This species was described from New Caledonia. It is known from Hong Kong, Papua New Guinea and Heron Island (Queensland), Australia.

== Description ==
This Ceratodoris has a broad body and many irregularly arranged papillae. The body is translucent and has some spots of dark brown surrounded by pale brown pigment.

== Ecology ==
The diet of this species is a bryozoan, Calpensia sp..
