= Goniodoridella cochimi =

Scientific classification
- Kingdom: Animalia
- Phylum: Mollusca
- Class: Gastropoda
- Order: Nudibranchia
- Family: Goniodorididae
- Genus: Goniodoridella
- Species: G. cochimi

Binomial name
- Goniodoridella cochimi (Gosliner & Bertsch, 2004)

Synonyms
- Okenia cochimi Gosliner & Bertsch, 2004

Species of gastropod

Goniodoridella cochimi is a species of sea slug, specifically a dorid nudibranch, a marine gastropod mollusc in the subfamily Goniodoridinae in the family Goniodorididae.

== Distribution ==
This species was described from Isla Espíritu Santo, Baja California Sur with an additional specimen from Isla Cedros on the Pacific Ocean coast of Baja California. It has subsequently been reported as far south as the Islas Revillagigedos.

== Description ==
This Goniodoridella has a narrow body and five to eight pairs of lateral papillae. The body is translucent yellow with more opaque yellow pigment on the papillae, rhinophores and gills.

== Ecology ==
The diet of this species is probably an encrusting bryozoan.
