= Ceratodoris lambat =

Scientific classification
- Kingdom: Animalia
- Phylum: Mollusca
- Class: Gastropoda
- Order: Nudibranchia
- Family: Goniodorididae
- Genus: Ceratodoris
- Species: C. lambat

Binomial name
- Ceratodoris lambat (Gosliner, 2004)

Synonyms
- Okenia lambat Gosliner, 2004

Species of gastropod

Ceratodoris lambat is a species of sea slug, specifically a dorid nudibranch, a marine gastropod mollusc in the subfamily Goniodoridinae in the family Goniodorididae.

== Distribution ==
This species was described from Luzon Island, Philippines.

== Description ==
This Ceratodoris has a broad body and eight pairs of long, pointed, lateral papillae. There is a single papilla on the back, in front of the gills. The body is opaque yellowish white and there is a broken brown band which runs from between the rhinophores to the tail, encircling the back and gills. This band is broken into a crazy paving pattern by thin white lines.

== Ecology ==
The diet of this species is not known.
