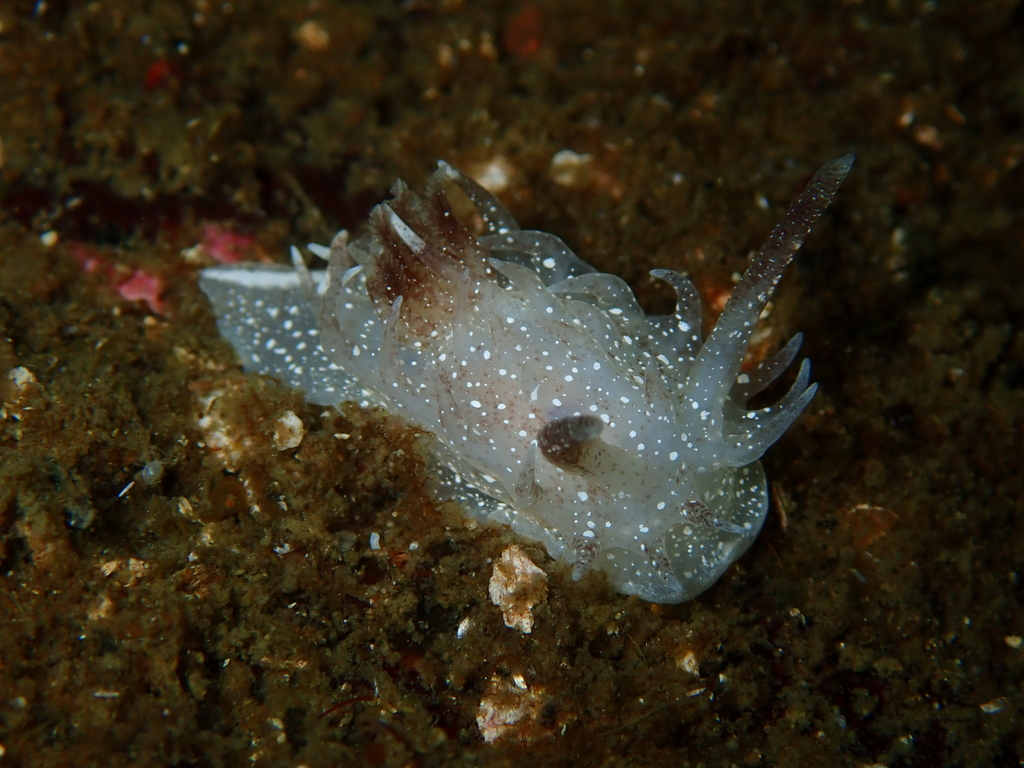

Scientific classification
- Kingdom: Animalia
- Phylum: Mollusca
- Class: Gastropoda
- Order: Nudibranchia
- Family: Goniodorididae
- Genus: Ceratodoris
- Species: C. vancouverensis

Binomial name
- Ceratodoris vancouverensis (O'Donoghue, 1921)

Synonyms
- Idalia vancouverensis O'Donoghue, 1921; Okenia vancouverensis (O'Donoghue, 1921)

= Ceratodoris vancouverensis =

Species of gastropod

Ceratodoris vancouverensis is a species of sea slug, specifically a dorid nudibranch, a marine gastropod mollusc in the subfamily Goniodoridinae in the family Goniodorididae.

== Distribution ==
This species was described from shallow water (20–30 m) at Rosespit at the north end of the Queen Charlotte Islands, Canada. It is known from British Columbia south to Washington state.

== Description ==
This Ceratodoris has an ovate body and nine to ten thin tapering lateral papillae on each side of the body. There are about twenty scattered papillae on the back. The body is translucent brown with scattered white spots and there is a broad white line which runs from the gills to the tip of the tail.

== Ecology ==
The diet of this species is not known.
