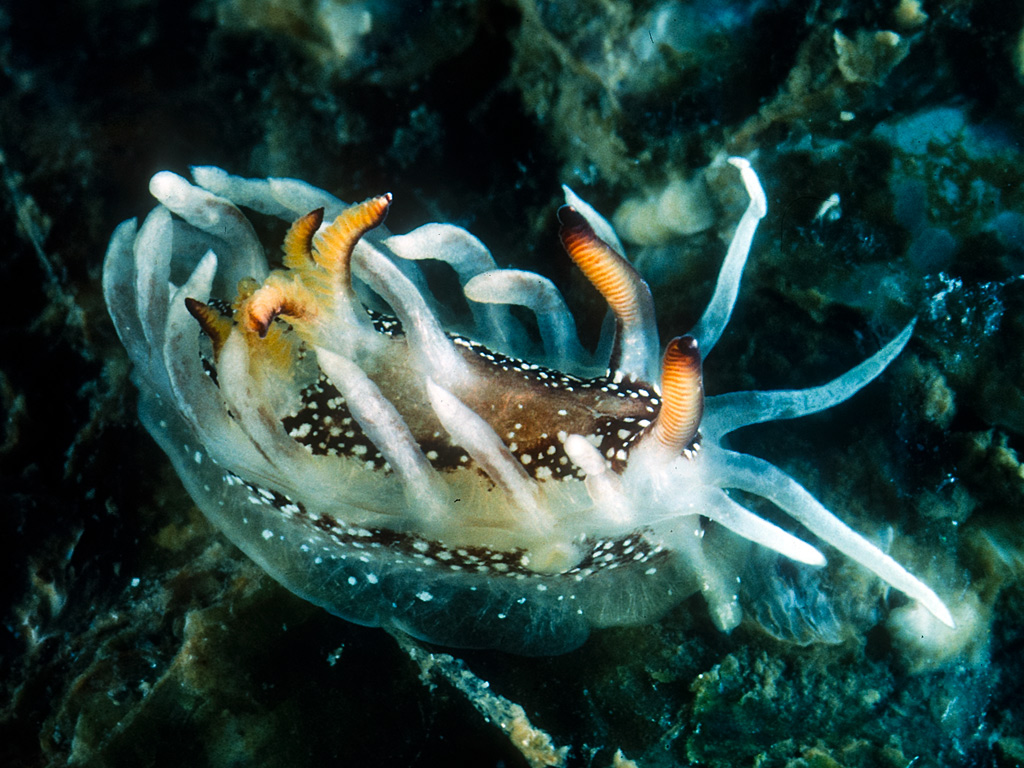
- The nudibranch Ceratodoris barnardi, Mirs Bay, Hong Kong.

Scientific classification
- Kingdom: Animalia
- Phylum: Mollusca
- Class: Gastropoda
- Order: Nudibranchia
- Family: Goniodorididae
- Genus: Ceratodoris
- Species: C. barnardi

Binomial name
- Ceratodoris barnardi (Baba, 1937)

Synonyms
- Okenia barnardi Baba, 1937

= Ceratodoris barnardi =

Species of gastropod

Ceratodoris barnardi is a species of sea slug, specifically a dorid nudibranch, a marine gastropod mollusc in the subfamily Goniodoridinae in the family Goniodorididae.

== Distribution ==
This species was described from Japan. It has also been reported from Hong Kong.

C. barnardi, Japan

== Description ==
This Ceratodoris has a narrow body and eight or nine pairs of curved lateral papillae. There is a single mid-dorsal papilla on the back, in front of the gills. The body is translucent and the back (mantle) is chestnut brown with white spots, the brown pigment becoming fainter in the middle of the back.

== Ecology ==
The diet of this species is a bryozoan, which lives in shallow water.

== Etymology ==
This species was named in honour of Keppel Harcourt Barnard who named a number of South African nudibranchs.
