= Ceratodoris eolida =

Scientific classification
- Kingdom: Animalia
- Phylum: Mollusca
- Class: Gastropoda
- Order: Nudibranchia
- Family: Goniodorididae
- Genus: Ceratodoris
- Species: C. eolida

Binomial name
- Ceratodoris eolida (Quoy & Gaimard, 1832)

Synonyms
- Doris eolida Quoy & Gaimard, 1832; Okenia eolida (Quoy & Gaimard, 1832)

Species of gastropod

Ceratodoris eolida is a species of sea slug, specifically a dorid nudibranch, a marine gastropod mollusc in the subfamily Goniodoridinae in the family Goniodorididae.

== Distribution ==
This species was described from the South China Sea. It has been found in many places in the western Pacific Ocean including Japan, Hong Kong, New Zealand, Australia and the Philippines.

== Description ==
This Ceratodoris has a broad body and five elongate lateral papillae on each side of the mantle. The colour is translucent white covered with brown patches which almost touch, leaving a pattern of lines between them.

== Ecology ==
The diet of this species is probably the bryozoans Membranipora membranacea, Cryptosula pallasiana and Jellyella tuberculata.
