= Bermudella purpurata =

Scientific classification
- Kingdom: Animalia
- Phylum: Mollusca
- Class: Gastropoda
- Order: Nudibranchia
- Family: Goniodorididae
- Subfamily: Goniodoridinae
- Genus: Bermudella
- Species: B. purpurata

Binomial name
- Bermudella purpurata (Rudman, 2004)

Synonyms
- Okenia purpurata Rudman, 2004

Species of gastropod

Okenia purpurata is a species of sea slug, specifically a dorid nudibranch, a marine gastropod mollusc in the subfamily Goniodoridinae in the family Goniodorididae.

== Distribution ==
This species was described from northern New South Wales, Australia. It is also known from Singapore.

== Description ==
This Bermudella has a narrow body and seven lateral papillae on each side and a single papilla in the middle of the back. The body is purple and the papillae are white. The rhinophores and gills are darker purple.

== Ecology ==
The diet of this species is the ctenostome bryozoan Amathia tortuosa. It shares this food preference with Okenia vena which is very similar in shape but completely different in coloration.
