= Bermudella vena =

Scientific classification
- Kingdom: Animalia
- Phylum: Mollusca
- Class: Gastropoda
- Order: Nudibranchia
- Family: Goniodorididae
- Subfamily: Goniodoridinae
- Genus: Bermudella
- Species: B. vena

Binomial name
- Bermudella vena (Rudman, 2004)

Synonyms
- Okenia vena Rudman, 2004

Species of gastropod

Bermudella vena is a species of sea slug, specifically a dorid nudibranch, a marine gastropod mollusc in the subfamily Goniodoridinae in the family Goniodorididae.

== Distribution ==
This species was described from northern New South Wales, Australia. It is known only from eastern Australia.

== Description ==
This Bermudella has a narrow body and seven to eight lateral papillae on each side and papillae in the middle of the back. The body is white and the rhinophores are brown. There is a pattern of broken brown lines on the back and tail.

== Ecology ==
The diet of this species is the ctenostome bryozoan Amathia tortuosa.
