= Ceratodoris sapelona =

Scientific classification
- Kingdom: Animalia
- Phylum: Mollusca
- Class: Gastropoda
- Order: Nudibranchia
- Family: Goniodorididae
- Genus: Ceratodoris
- Species: C. sapelona

Binomial name
- Ceratodoris sapelona (Ev. Marcus & Er. Marcus, 1967)

Synonyms
- Okenia sapelona Ev. Marcus & Er. Marcus, 1967

Species of gastropod

Ceratodoris sapelona is a species of sea slug, specifically a dorid nudibranch, a marine gastropod mollusc in the subfamily Goniodoridinae in the family Goniodorididae.

== Distribution ==
This species was described from Sapelo Island, Georgia, United States.
