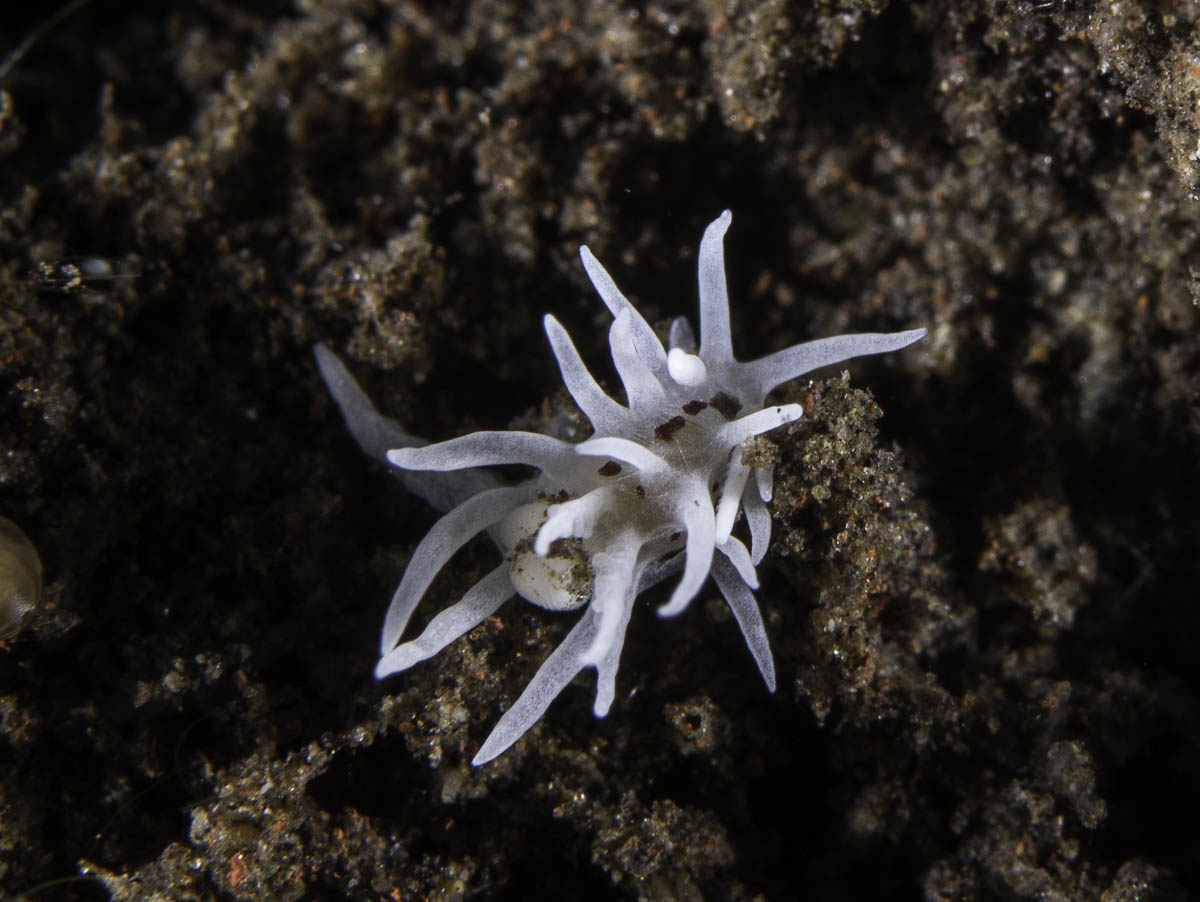
- The nudibranch Bermudella brunneomaculata, Batu Niti, Bali, Indonesia.

Scientific classification
- Kingdom: Animalia
- Phylum: Mollusca
- Class: Gastropoda
- Order: Nudibranchia
- Family: Goniodorididae
- Subfamily: Goniodoridinae
- Genus: Bermudella
- Species: B. brunneomaculata

Binomial name
- Bermudella brunneomaculata (Gosliner, 2004)

Synonyms
- Okenia brunneomaculata Gosliner, 2004

= Bermudella brunneomaculata =

Species of gastropod

Bermudella brunneomaculata is a species of sea slug, specifically a dorid nudibranch, a marine gastropod mollusc in the subfamily Goniodoridinae in the family Goniodorididae.

== Distribution ==
This species was described from Luzon Island, Philippines. It has also been reported from Timor, Sulawesi and Moreton Island, Queensland, Australia.

== Description ==
This Bermudella has a broad body and five or six pairs of long, pointed, lateral papillae. There are four to seven papillae on the back, in front of the gills. The body is translucent white and there are broken chocolate brown bands which run from between the rhinophores to the tail, encircling the back and gills. There are additional chocolate brown spots in the middle of the back and on the sides of the foot.

== Ecology ==
The diet of this species is a ctenostome bryozoan.
