= Bermudella purpureolineata =

Scientific classification
- Kingdom: Animalia
- Phylum: Mollusca
- Class: Gastropoda
- Order: Nudibranchia
- Family: Goniodorididae
- Subfamily: Goniodoridinae
- Genus: Bermudella
- Species: B. purpureolineata

Binomial name
- Bermudella purpureolineata (Gosliner, 2004)

Synonyms
- Okenia purpureolineata Gosliner, 2004

Species of gastropod

Bermudella purpureolineata is a species of sea slug, specifically a dorid nudibranch, a marine gastropod mollusc in the subfamily Goniodoridinae in the family Goniodorididae.

== Distribution ==
This species was described from Okinawa, Ryukyu Islands, Japan.

== Description ==
This Bermudella has a narrow body and seven pairs of long lateral papillae. There are two papillae on the mid-line of the back, in front of the gills. The body is translucent purple and there is a network of dark purple lines on the back running from in front of the rhinophores to behind the gills.

== Ecology ==
The diet of this species is the ctenostome bryozoan, Amathia sp.
