= Kendi (name) =

Kendi may refer to the following notable people:

Given or stage name

- Kendi (musician) (born 1989), Serbian singer
- Kendi Rosales (born 1990), Honduran sprinter

Surname

- Ibram X. Kendi (born 1982), American author and historian
- István Kendi (?–c.1628), Hungarian noble
- János Kendi (?–1677), Hungarian jurist
- Sándor Kendi (?–1594), Hungarian noble

== See also ==
- Kendis
