= Kendis =

Kendis may refer to the following notable people:

Given name

- Kendis Gibson (born 1972), American journalist
- Kendis Moore (born 1948), American swimmer

Surname

- J. D. Kendis (1886–1957), American film producer
- Sonny Kendis (1911–1974), American pianist, the star of The Sonny Kendis Show
- William Kendis (1916–1980), American actor

== See also ==
- Kendi (name)
