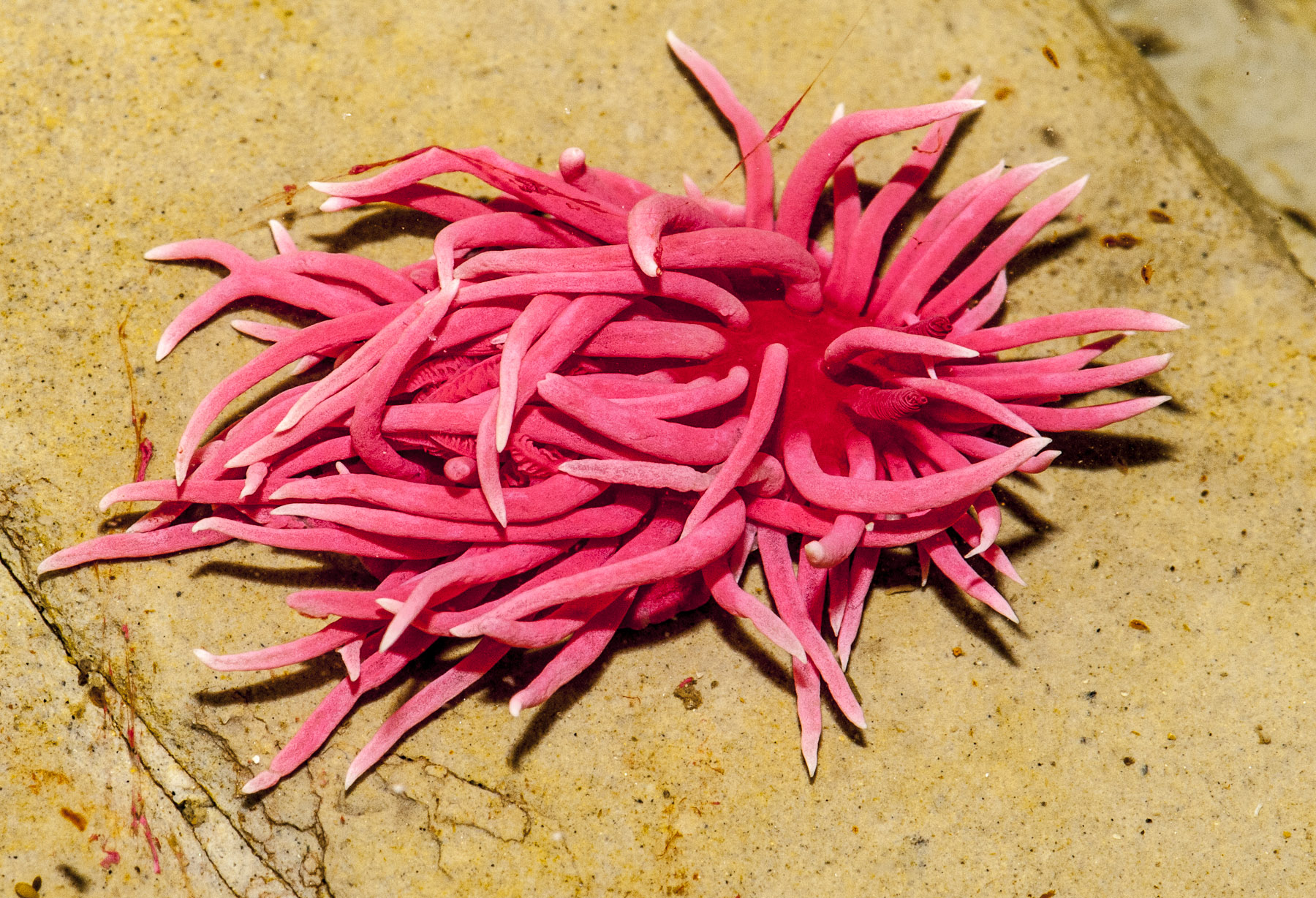

Scientific classification
- Kingdom: Animalia
- Phylum: Mollusca
- Class: Gastropoda
- Order: Nudibranchia
- Family: Goniodorididae
- Genus: Ceratodoris
- Species: C. rosacea

Binomial name
- Ceratodoris rosacea (MacFarland, 1905)

Synonyms
- Okenia rosacea Hopkinsia rosacea MacFarland, 1905

= Ceratodoris rosacea =

Species of gastropod

Hopkin's rose nudibranch is a species of sea slug, specifically a dorid nudibranch, a marine gastropod mollusc in the family Goniodorididae. Previously known as Okenia rosacea, this species was reclassified as Ceratodoris rosacea in 2024.

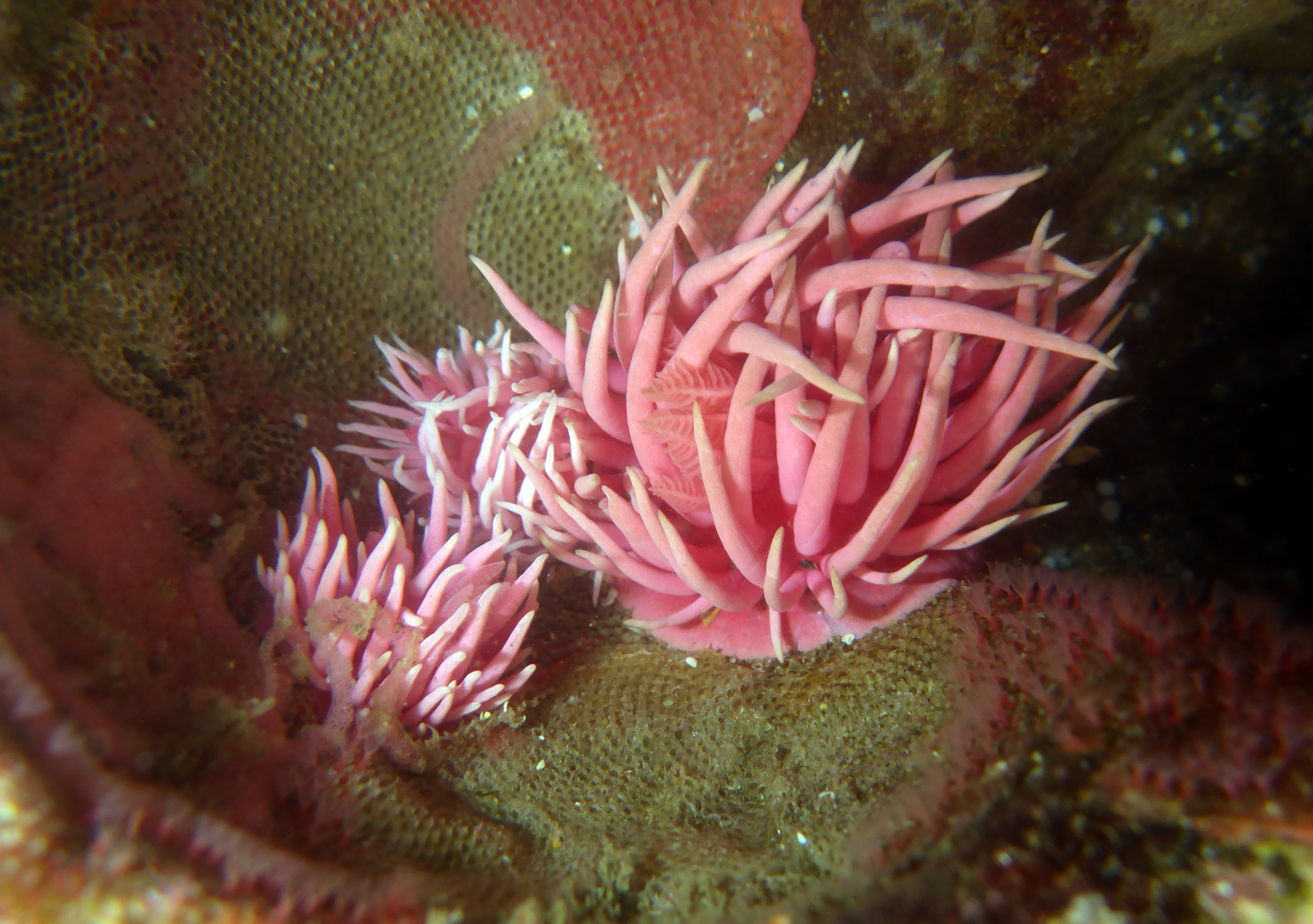
Three Ceratodoris rosacea (Hopkin's rose nudibranch) and egg spiral on bryozoan

== Distribution ==
This species was described from Monterey Bay, California. It can be found along the coast of western North America from Oregon to Baja California.

== Description ==
These pink sea slugs are characterized by numerous long papillae on their back, tapering into a round tip. These papillae are sometimes more or less white at their tips. This pink color is produced by the xanthophyllic pigment hopkinsiaxanthin, most likely obtained through feeding on the cheilostomatous bryozoan, Integripelta bilabiata.

The mantle, foot and the head are merged into one entity with a flattened profile. The oral tentacles are lacking. The 20 gills are situated around the anal papillae and are somewhat shorter.

The shape of the taenioglossan radula is unique in this family, as the middle tooth is large and elongate, ending in a hook-like tip. The lateral teeth are small and are actually reduced to a rudimentary plate.
