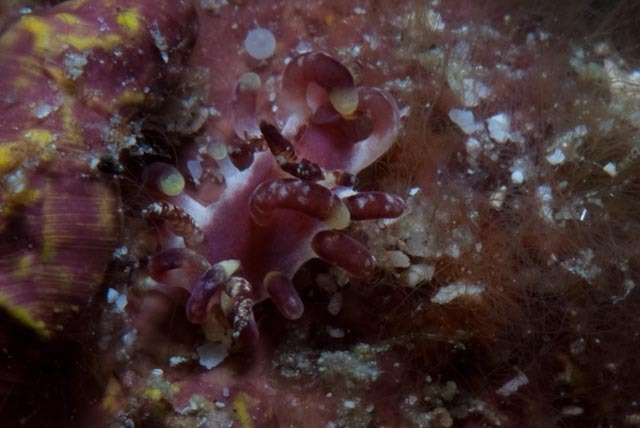

Scientific classification
- Kingdom: Animalia
- Phylum: Mollusca
- Class: Gastropoda
- Order: Nudibranchia
- Family: Goniodorididae
- Genus: Ceratodoris
- Species: C. kendi

Binomial name
- Ceratodoris kendi (Gosliner, 2004)

Synonyms
- Okenia kendi Gosliner, 2004

= Ceratodoris kendi =

Species of gastropod

Ceratodoris kendi is a species of sea slug, specifically a dorid nudibranch, a marine gastropod mollusc in the subfamily Goniodoridinae in the family Goniodorididae.

== Distribution ==
This species was described from Luzon Island, Philippines. It has also been reported from Timor and the Lembeh Strait, Sulawesi.

== Description ==
This Ceratodoris has a broad body and eight pairs of long lateral papillae. There is a single papilla on the back, in front of the gills. The body is translucent white and there is a broad brown band which runs from between the rhinophores to the tail, encircling the gills and running down the tail. There is a brown line on the side of the foot, just below the lateral papillae. The outer two thirds of the papillae are also brown, often with a purple iridescent hue at the tips.

== Ecology ==
The diet of this species is an encrusting bryozoan.
