= Ceratodoris digitata =

Scientific classification
- Kingdom: Animalia
- Phylum: Mollusca
- Class: Gastropoda
- Order: Nudibranchia
- Family: Goniodorididae
- Genus: Ceratodoris
- Species: C. digitata

Binomial name
- Ceratodoris digitata (Edmunds, 1966)

Synonyms
- Teshia digitata Edmunds, 1966; Okenia digitata (Edmunds, 1966)

Species of gastropod

Ceratodoris digitata is a species of sea slug, specifically a dorid nudibranch, a marine gastropod mollusc in the subfamily Goniodoridinae in the family Goniodorididae..

== Distribution ==
This species was described from Ghana. It has also been reported from Angola.
