= János Kendi =

- Born: 1600s Nagykend, Principality of Transylvania
- Died: 1677
- Noble family: Kendi de Nagykend
- Spouses: 1, Erzsébet Bakó; 2, Zsófia Móré
- Issue: unidentified children

János Kendi de Nagykend (Hungarian: nagykendi Kendi János; died 1677) was a Hungarian jurist, who served as assistant notary of Michael I Apafi, Prince of Transylvania from 1661 to 1677.

== Career ==
He was of serf origin (thus he was not related to the Kendi de Szarvaskend noble family). According to his last will and testament, Kendi liberated his parents himself from serfdom, when he was already notary. Based on his noble prefix, it is possible that he was born in the early 1600s in Nagykend (today Chendu, part of Bălăușeri commune in Romania). In 1623, he was a scribe at the Princely Court of Justice during the reign of Gabriel Bethlen. He was a scribe at the Lesser Chancellery between 1632 and 1638. He compiled the urbarium of Székelyudvarhely (present-day Odorheiu Secuiesc, Romania) and its surrounding areas in 1644. In the last years of Prince George II Rákóczi, Kendi served as notary of Marosszék, mentioned in this capacity in 1656. He became a judge of the Princely Court of Justice in the next year, becoming one of the few known lowborn members, who have reached that office. In the same time, he was appointed princely praefectus too and managed the financial affairs of the Alvinc lordship (today Vințu de Jos, Romania) in 1659. He was responsible for the collection of extraordinary (including Turkish) taxes in 1660, assisting the work of András Ugron, chief treasurer of the principality. During the trouble years of 1658–61, he constantly interchanged his loyalty between claimants George Rákóczi, John Kemény and Michael Apafi, similarly to the majority of the Transylvanian lords. For instance, he fled to the attackers' camp "in an unworthy way to his noble status", when John Kemény laid siege to Segesvár (Sighișoara, Romania), as Saxon historian Georg Krauss recorded. Contemporary works (including a mocking poem by scribe Lukács) connected his rapid ascension from the lowest social status with his alleged "miser and two-faced" personality.

Michael I Apafi, who ascended the throne in September 1661 appointed Kendi as assistant notary or "master of the judgement" (Hungarian: ítélőmester), an eminence he occupied as long as he lived. He participated in the upcoming diets and was involved in several lawsuits, for instance the case between the tanners and cobblers in Brassó (today Brașov, Romania) in 1665. According to the narration of Chancellor Miklós Bethlen's Memoires, Kendi died in the autumn of 1677.

== Personal life ==
János Kendi married a noblewoman Erzsébet Bakó, thus after that, he closely connected to the Transylvanian nobility as a consequence of several marriage alliances. For instance, his brother-in-law was captain-general István Bakó, who was executed by Gábor Barcsay, brother of Prince Ákos Barcsay in 1660. The marriage produced several unidentified children, but all of them predeceased their father Kendi, who adopted his late siblings' children towards the end of his life. Around 1664, he married for the second time to Zsófia Móré, widow of Rákóczi's former diplomat and envoy István Tisza de Borosjenő (died in 1663).

He increased his personal wealth on his well-devised marriages and certain juridical maneuvers unascertained by his contemporaries, through which he has also received considerable property. Towards the middle of the 1670s, he owned landholdings and estates in Küküllő and Torda counties as well as in the territories of Székely seats of Marosszék and Udvarhelyszék. He built his principal residence in Kelementelke (today Călimănești in Fântânele commune, Romania). Kendi made his last will in the mid-1670s. As he had no descendants, his second wife's family largely inherited his wealth, while other estates were donated to Calvinist academies and schools, in accordance with his will. A considerable part of his possessions returned into the Principality's fiscal property.

== Sources ==
- Csáki, Árpád (2012). "Kendi János, Apafi Mihály fejedelem ítélőmestere (1661–1667) [János Kendi, Prince Michael I Apafi's Assistant Notary]". In Pál-Antal, Sándor; Simon, Zsolt (eds.). A Maros megyei magyarság történtéből. III. kötet (in Hungarian). Mentor Kiadó. pp. 42–52. ISBN 978-973-599-570-6.
- Trócsányi, Zsolt (1980). Erdély központi kormányzata 1540–1690 [The Central Government of Transylvania, 1540–1690] (in Hungarian). Akadémiai Kiadó. ISBN 963-05-2327-2.
