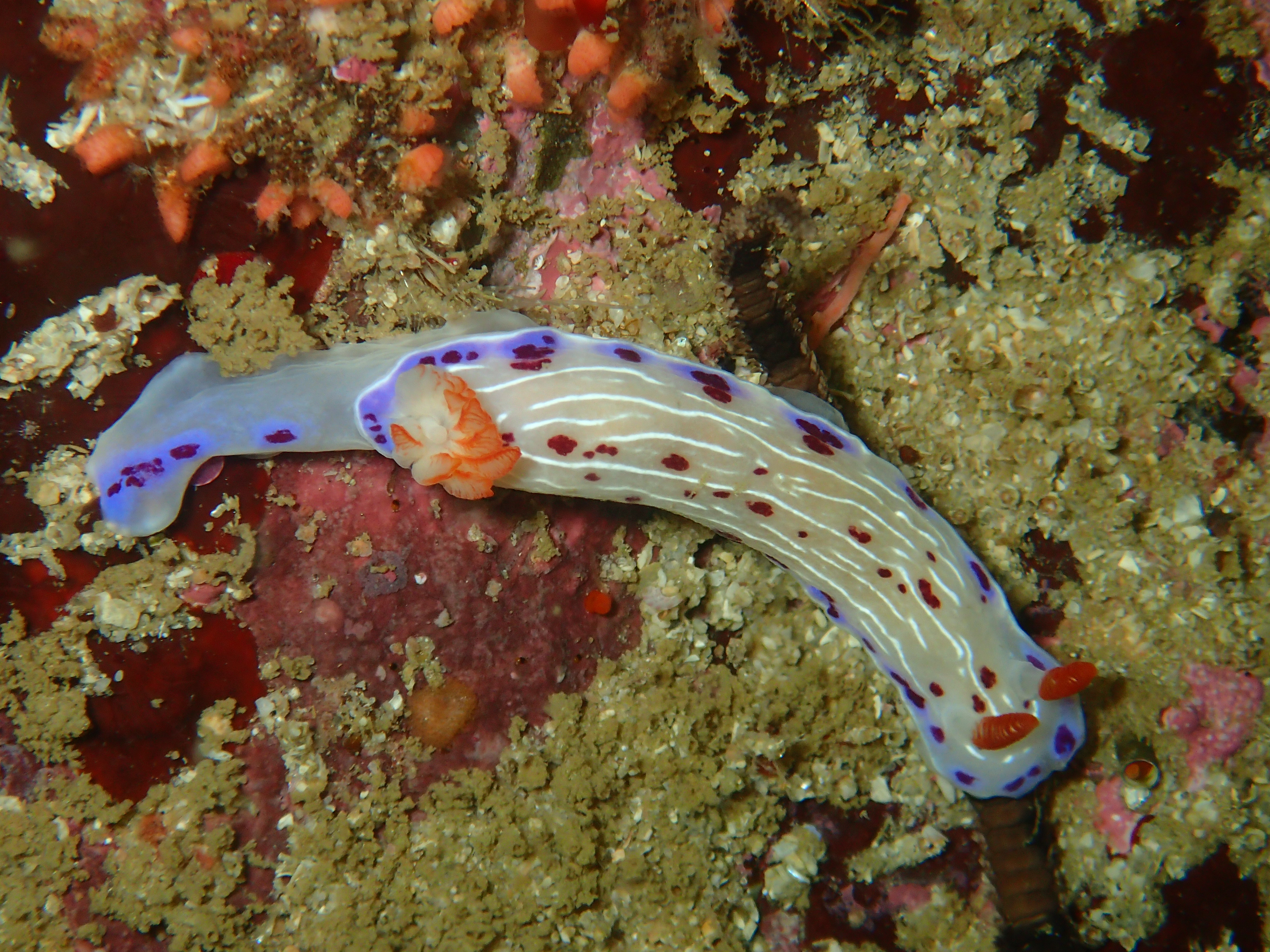
- Hypselodoris

Scientific classification
- Kingdom: Animalia
- Phylum: Mollusca
- Class: Gastropoda
- Order: Nudibranchia
- Suborder: Doridina
- Infraorder: Doridoidei

Superfamilies
- See text.

= Doridoidei =

Clade of gastropods

Doridoidei is an infraorder of dorid nudibranchs, shell-less marine gastropod mollusks.

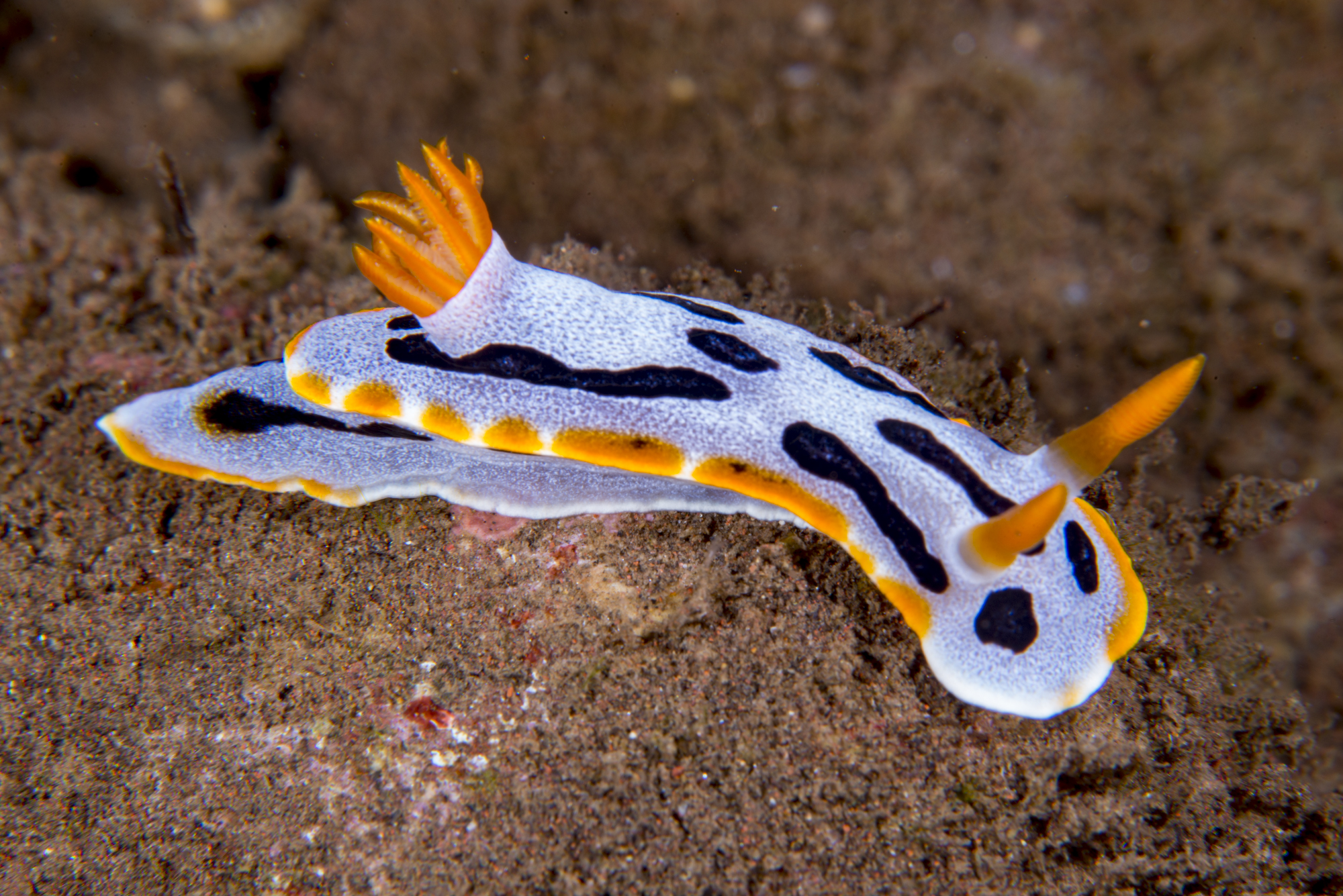
Chromodorididae

== Taxonomy ==
- Superfamily Chromodoridoidea
  - Family Actinocyclidae
  - Family Cadlinellidae
  - Family Cadlinidae
  - Family Chromodorididae
  - Family Hexabranchidae
  - Family Showajidaiidae

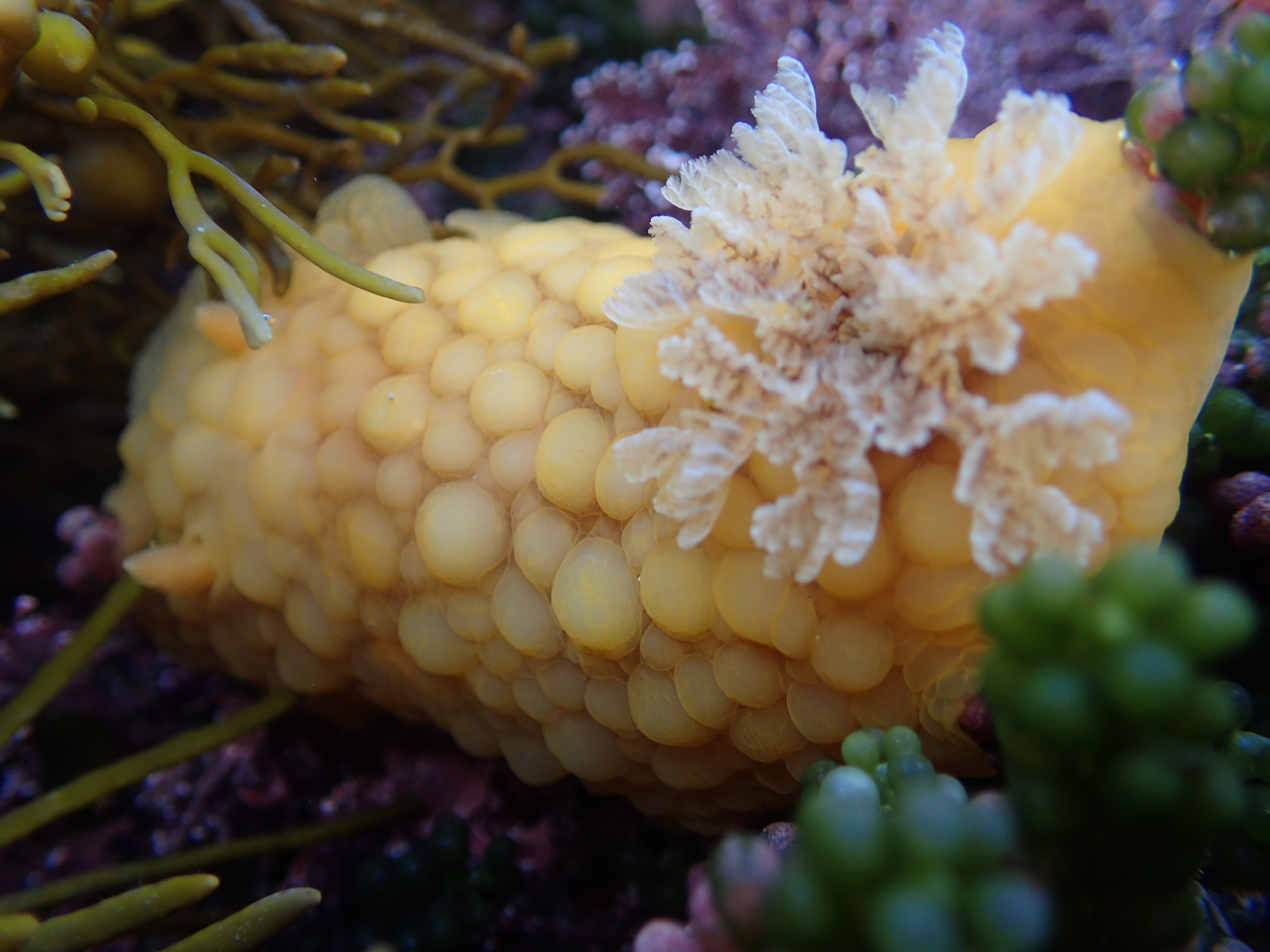
Dorididae

- Superfamily Doridoidea
  - Family Dorididae
  - Family Discodorididae

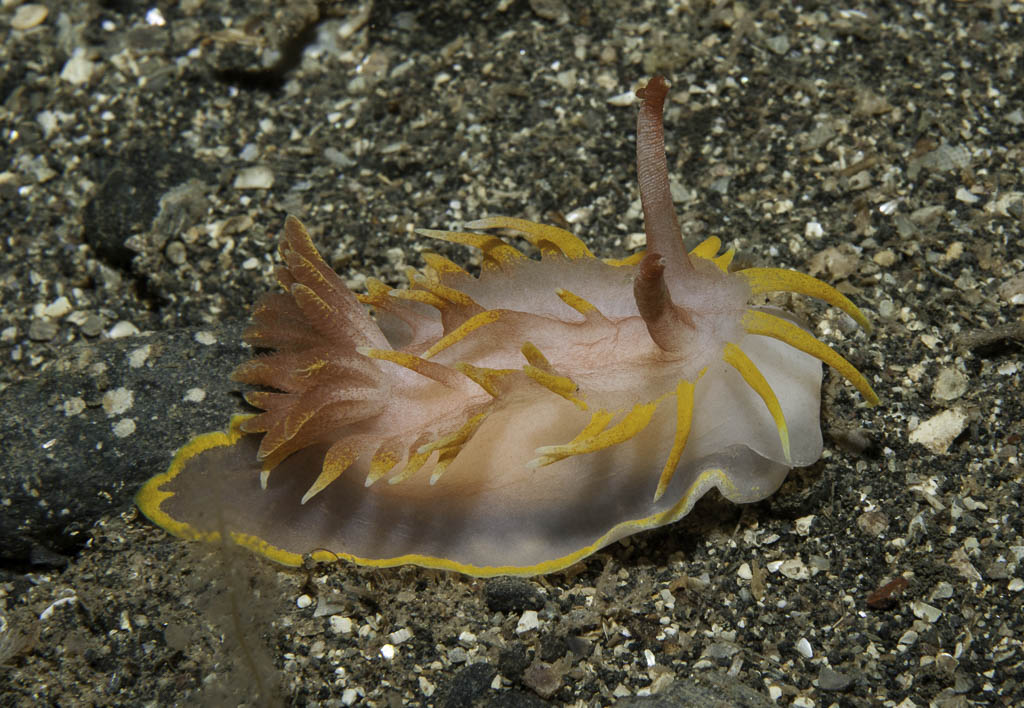
Goniodorididae

- Superfamily Onchidoridoidea
  - Family Acanthodorididae
  - Family Acanthomiridae
  - Family Aegiridae
  - Family Akiodorididae
  - Family Calycidorididae
  - Family Corambidae
  - Family Goniodorididae
  - Family Onchidorididae
  - Family Onchimiridae

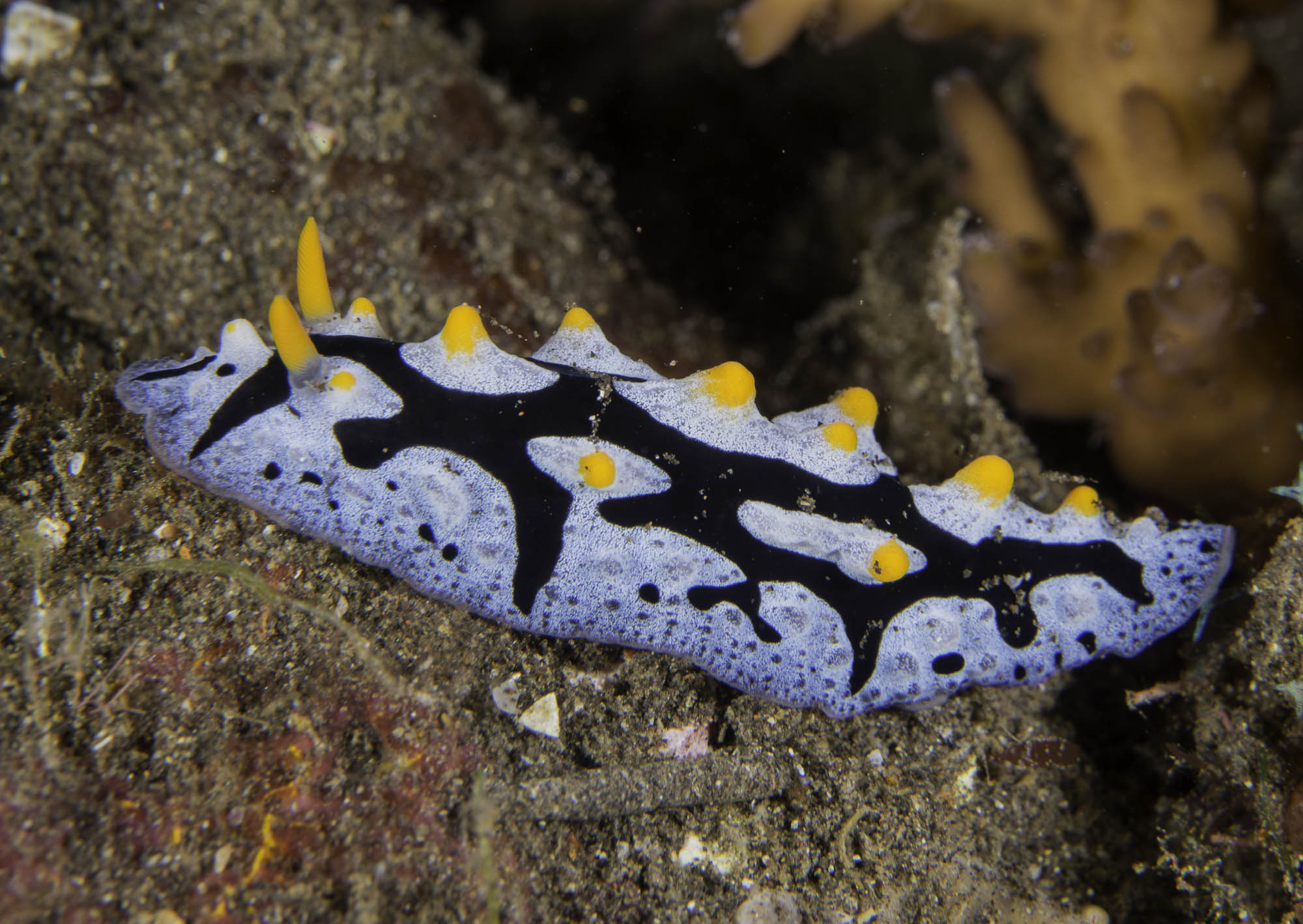
Phyllidiidae

- Superfamily Phyllidioidea
  - Family Dendrodorididae
  - Family Forjacellidae
  - Family Mandeliidae
  - Family Phyllidiidae

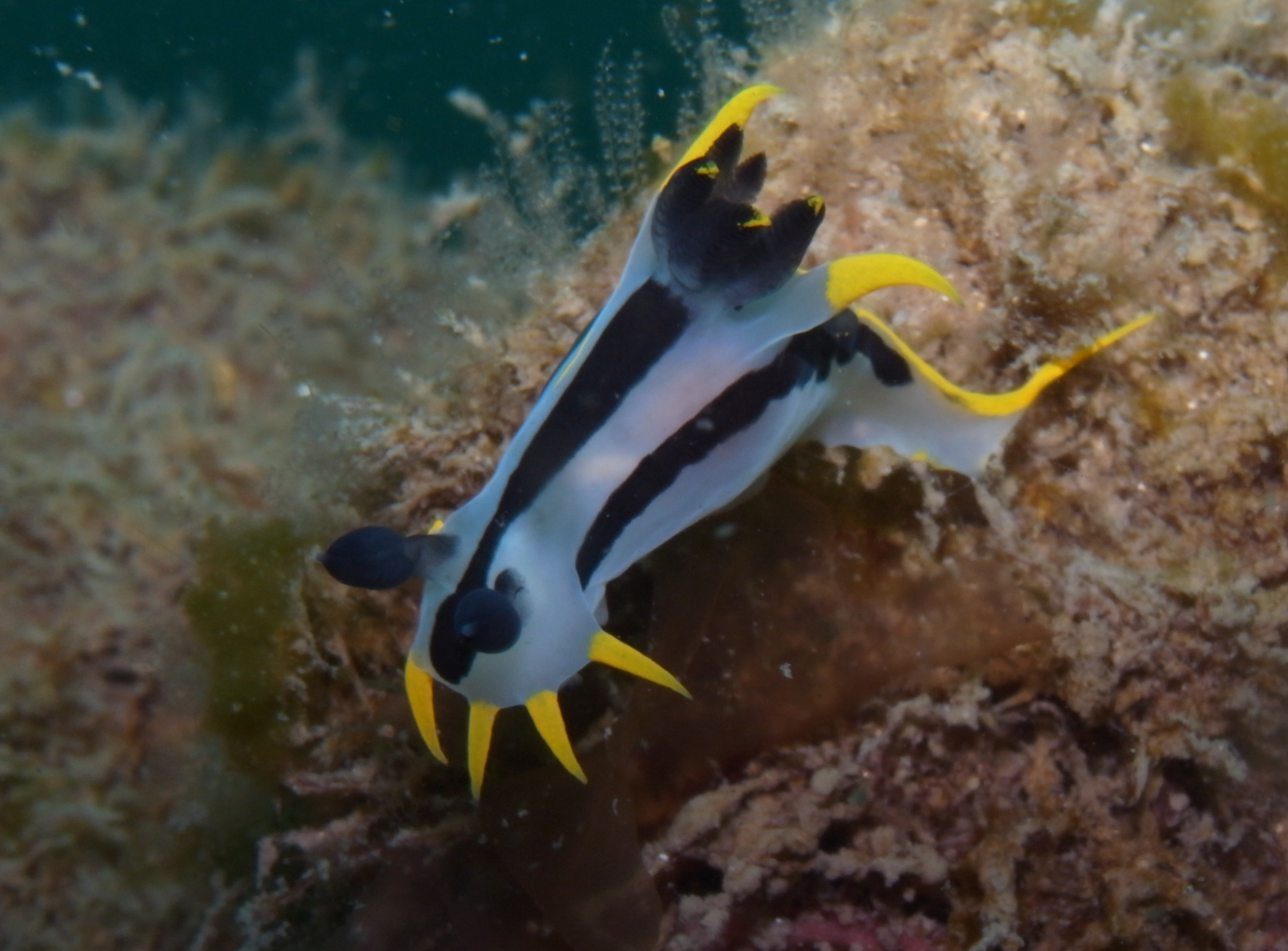
Polyceridae

- Superfamily Polyceroidea
  - Family Polyceridae

== Description ==
Nudibranchs in this grouping have a mantle which overlaps the sides of the foot, apart from the tail in some families. In the Superfamily Polyceroidea and the Family Goniodorididae this is often reduced to a ridge which may bear processes. There is usually a ring of external branched gills surrounding the anus towards the back of the body, but in some subgroups these gills can be located beneath the sides of the mantle (Family Phyllidiidae, Family Corambidae). Typically there are two rhinophores with lamellae which arise through the mantle towards the front of the animals.
