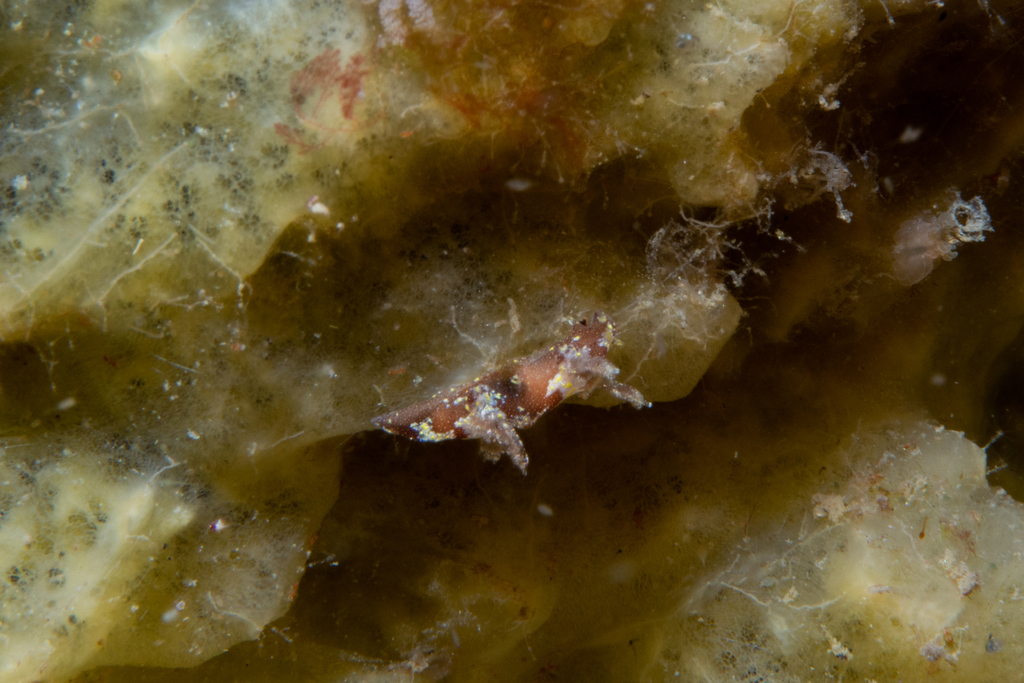

Scientific classification
- Kingdom: Animalia
- Phylum: Mollusca
- Class: Gastropoda
- Order: Nudibranchia
- Family: Goniodorididae
- Genus: Trapania
- Species: T. benni

Binomial name
- Trapania benni Rudman, 1987

= Trapania benni =

Species of gastropod

Trapania benni is a species of sea slug, a dorid nudibranch, a marine gastropod mollusc in the family Goniodorididae.

== Distribution ==
This species was described from New South Wales, Australia. It has also been reported from Victoria, Rapid Bay, South Australia and Fremantle, Western Australia.

== Description ==
This goniodorid nudibranch is translucent white with a meshwork pattern of pale brown forming irregular patches on the body. There are round yellow spots on the head, behind the rhinophores, behind the gills and on the rhinophores and gills, all within the white areas.

== Ecology ==
Trapania benni probably feeds on Entoprocta, which often grow on sponges and other living substrata.
