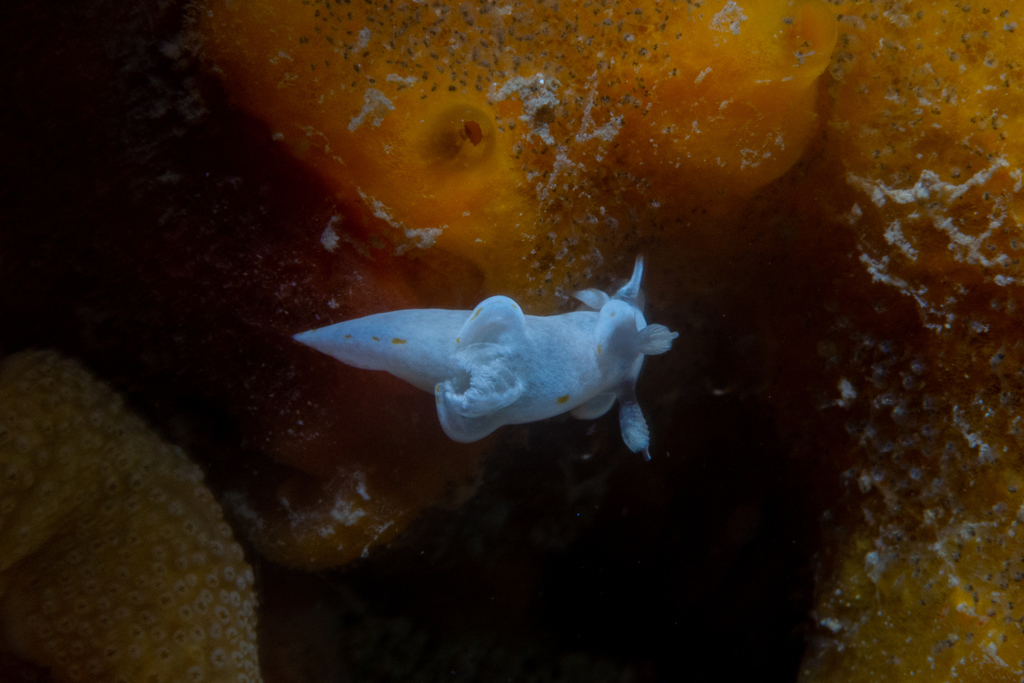

Scientific classification
- Kingdom: Animalia
- Phylum: Mollusca
- Class: Gastropoda
- Order: Nudibranchia
- Family: Goniodorididae
- Subfamily: Anculinae
- Genus: Trapania
- Species: T. aureopunctata

Binomial name
- Trapania aureopunctata Rudman, 1987

= Trapania aureopunctata =

Species of gastropod

Trapania aureopunctata is a species of sea slug, a dorid nudibranch, a marine gastropod mollusc in the family Goniodorididae.

== Distribution ==
This species was described from Sydney, New South Wales, Australia. It has also been reported from Tasmania and Victoria.

== Description ==
The body of this goniodorid nudibranch is opaque white. There are very fine orange spots and a few larger orange spots on the body and lateral papillae.

== Ecology ==
Trapania aureopunctata probably feeds on Entoprocta which often grow on sponges and other living substrata.
