= Trapania dalva =

Scientific classification
- Kingdom: Animalia
- Phylum: Mollusca
- Class: Gastropoda
- Order: Nudibranchia
- Family: Goniodorididae
- Subfamily: Anculinae
- Genus: Trapania
- Species: T. dalva

Binomial name
- Trapania dalva Marcus, 1972

Species of gastropod

Trapania dalva is a species of sea slug, a dorid nudibranch, a marine gastropod mollusc in the family Goniodorididae.

== Distribution ==
This species was first described from Miami, Florida. It has also been reported from the Bahamas.

== Description ==
This goniodorid nudibranch is cream with brown patches, with white bosses on the body. This appearance with raised tubercles is illustrated in one photograph from Florida. Larger animals have extensive brown patches reminiscent of Trapania brunnea and small raised tubercles.

The maximum recorded body length is 12 mm.

== Ecology ==
Minimum recorded depth is 0 m. Maximum recorded depth is 0 m.

Trapania dalva probably feeds on Entoprocta which often grow on sponges, sea squirts and other living substrata.
