= Trapania reticulata =

Scientific classification
- Kingdom: Animalia
- Phylum: Mollusca
- Class: Gastropoda
- Order: Nudibranchia
- Family: Goniodorididae
- Subfamily: Anculinae
- Genus: Trapania
- Species: T. reticulata

Binomial name
- Trapania reticulata Rudman, 1987

Species of gastropod

Trapania reticulata is a species of sea slug, a dorid nudibranch, a marine gastropod mollusc in the family Goniodorididae.

== Distribution ==
This species was described from the Great Barrier Reef. It has also been reported from the Andaman Sea and Milne Bay, Papua New Guinea which suggests a wide distribution in the central Indo-Pacific region. It has also been photographed in Bali, Indonesia.

== Description ==
This goniodorid nudibranch is translucent yellow with a reticulate pattern of brown pigment on the body, rhinophores, gills, oral tentacles and lateral papillae. The lateral papillae and the rhinophore clubs are unusually large in this species.

== Ecology ==
Trapania reticulata feeds on Entoprocta which often grow on sponges and other living substrata.
