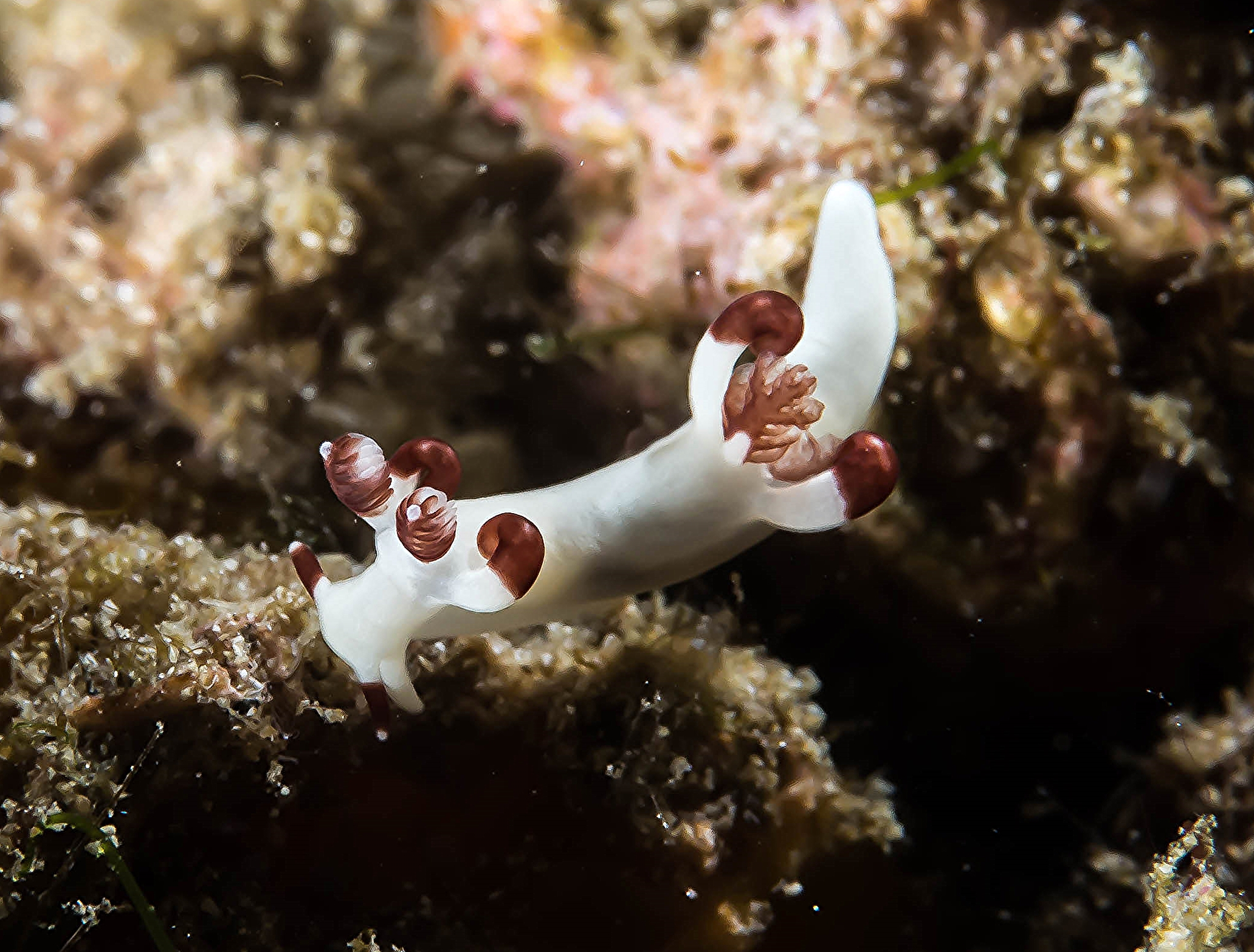

Scientific classification
- Kingdom: Animalia
- Phylum: Mollusca
- Class: Gastropoda
- Order: Nudibranchia
- Family: Goniodorididae
- Genus: Trapania
- Species: T. darvelli

Binomial name
- Trapania darvelli Rudman, 1987

= Trapania darvelli =

Species of gastropod

Trapania darvelli is a species of sea slug, a dorid nudibranch, a marine gastropod mollusc in the family Goniodorididae.

== Distribution ==
This species was described from Hong Kong. It has also been reported from Sabah, Malaysia and Honiara, Solomon Islands which suggests a wide distribution in the central Indo-Pacific region. This species has also been photographed in the Philippines and Taiwan.

== Description ==
This goniodorid nudibranch is translucent white frosted with opaque white pigment on the body. The rhinophores, gills, oral tentacles and lateral papillae are chocolate brown. The lateral papillae are unusually large in this species, with a swollen appearance.

== Ecology ==
Trapania darvelli probably feeds on Entoprocta which often grow on sponges and other living substrata.
