= Trapania bajamarensis =

Scientific classification
- Kingdom: Animalia
- Phylum: Mollusca
- Class: Gastropoda
- Order: Nudibranchia
- Family: Goniodorididae
- Genus: Trapania
- Species: T. bajamarensis

Binomial name
- Trapania bajamarensis Moro & Ortea, 2015

Species of gastropod

Trapania bajamarensis is a species of sea slug, a dorid nudibranch, a marine gastropod mollusc in the family Goniodorididae.

== Distribution ==
This species was described from the intertidal region at Bajamar, La Laguna Tenerife with additional specimens from Tenerife and Lanzarote. It was previously reported as Trapania luquei, a species from the Cape Verde Islands.

== Description ==
This goniodorid nudibranch is translucent white with an irregular pattern of pale brown forming patches on the body. There are yellow spots on the head, the body, the tail and on the rhinophores and gills. There is white opaque pigment on the head and tail and on the appendages.

== Ecology ==
Trapania bajamarensis probably feeds on Entoprocta, which often grow on sponges and other living substrata.
