= Trapania aurata =

Scientific classification
- Kingdom: Animalia
- Phylum: Mollusca
- Class: Gastropoda
- Order: Nudibranchia
- Family: Goniodorididae
- Subfamily: Anculinae
- Genus: Trapania
- Species: T. aurata

Binomial name
- Trapania aurata Rudman, 1987

Species of gastropod

Trapania aurata is a species of sea slug, a dorid nudibranch, a marine gastropod mollusc in the subfamily Anculinae in the family Goniodorididae.

== Distribution ==
This species was described from Hong Kong, China. It has also been reported from New Caledonia.

== Description ==
The body of this goniodorid nudibranch is opaque white. The oral tentacles are orange as well as the foot-corner tentacles. The rhinophores are white at their bases and lamellae, with orange tips with an orange stripe on the anterior face. The gills are translucent white except for a minor mark or very mild stripe of orange on the anterior face of each gill stalk, with much variation within the species The lateral processes always have an orange line from base to tip facing outwards. There is usually an orange line extending from the tip of the tail partway towards the gills.

The coloration is similar to Trapania vitta except in T. vitta the lateral processes are entirely white always, whereas T. aurata has orange stripes on each process always. Trapania gibbera is another species which is mainly white, but its gill leaves are well-lined with pigment.

== Ecology ==
Trapania aurata probably feeds on Entoprocta which often grow on sponges and other living substrata.
