= Trapania rudmani =

Scientific classification
- Kingdom: Animalia
- Phylum: Mollusca
- Class: Gastropoda
- Order: Nudibranchia
- Family: Goniodorididae
- Subfamily: Anculinae
- Genus: Trapania
- Species: T. rudmani

Binomial name
- Trapania rudmani Miller, 1981

Species of gastropod

Trapania rudmani is a species of sea slug, a dorid nudibranch, a marine gastropod mollusc in the family Goniodorididae.

== Distribution ==
This species was described from Otago, New Zealand. It is found throughout New Zealand but has not been reported elsewhere.

== Description ==
The body of this goniodorid nudibranch is translucent with a frosted white surface. The rhinophores, gills, oral tentacles and tail are slightly more heavily marked with white pigment. The lateral papillae are also white, but with an orange or yellow stripe on the outer sides. On occasion, there is mild yellow powdering on the back between the rhinophores and gills.

This species is very similar to Trapania aurata or Trapania vitta, but can be easily differentiated as T. rudmani has orange on lateral processes only; its oral tentacles, foot corners, and rhinophores are always only white.

== Ecology ==
Trapania rudmani feeds on Entoprocta which often grow on sponges and other living substrata.

== Gallery ==
Two individuals mating.

A specimen exhibiting some rare orange speckling on back.

Two individuals upon an Iophon minor sponge.

T. rudmani upon a grey sponge, anterior end towards right.

Head towards upper left, back facing camera somewhat.

An individual only 5mm long, sheltered in the valleys of a sponge's spiky surface
