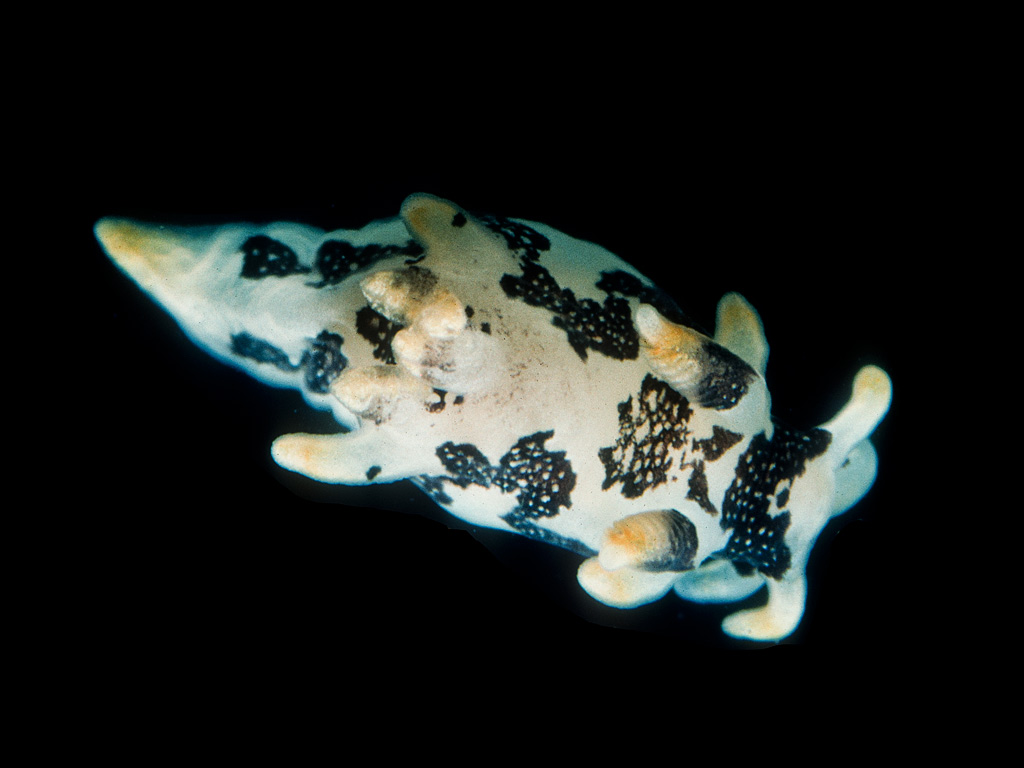
- The nudibranch, Trapania toddi, Tolo Channel, Hong Kong

Scientific classification
- Kingdom: Animalia
- Phylum: Mollusca
- Class: Gastropoda
- Order: Nudibranchia
- Family: Goniodorididae
- Genus: Trapania
- Species: T. toddi

Binomial name
- Trapania toddi Rudman, 1987

= Trapania toddi =

Species of gastropod

Trapania toddi is a species of sea slug, a dorid nudibranch, a marine gastropod mollusc in the family Goniodorididae.

== Distribution ==
This species was described from Loo Fu Fon, Tolo Channel, Hong Kong. The original description also includes a single specimen from Suakin, Sudan, Red Sea. It has also been reported from Heron Island (Queensland), Australia; Japan and Korea.

== Description ==
The body of this goniodorid nudibranch is white with brown or black patches containing white spots. The rhinophores, gills, oral tentacles, lateral papillae and tail are predominantly white with yellow patches below the tips. There is also a black or brown band on the front of the rhinophore, below the yellow patch.

== Ecology ==
Trapania toddi feeds on Entoprocta which often grow on sponges and other living substrata.
