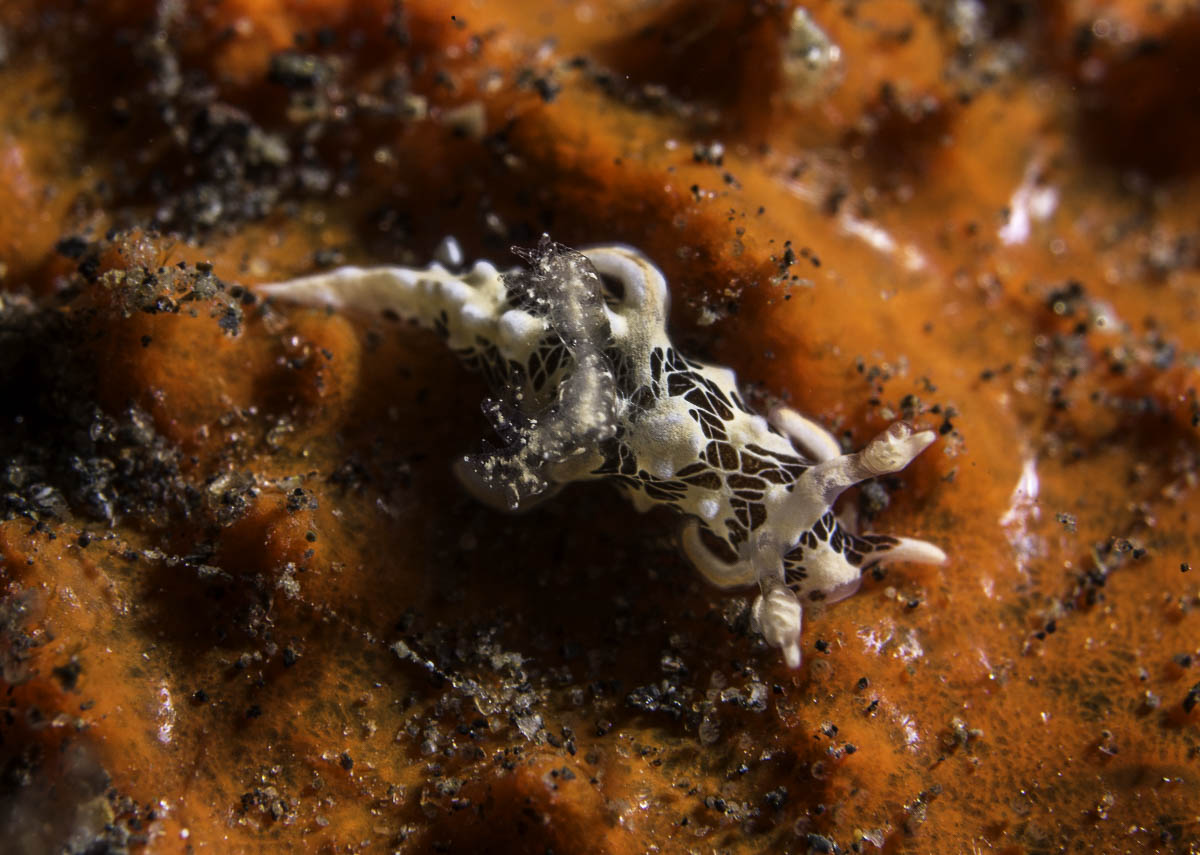
- The nudibranch Trapania tora, Tulamben, Bali, Indonesia.

Scientific classification
- Kingdom: Animalia
- Phylum: Mollusca
- Class: Gastropoda
- Order: Nudibranchia
- Family: Goniodorididae
- Genus: Trapania
- Species: T. tora

Binomial name
- Trapania tora Gosliner & Fahey, 2008

= Trapania tora =

Species of gastropod

Trapania tora is a species of sea slug, a dorid nudibranch, a marine gastropod mollusc in the family Goniodorididae.

== Distribution ==
This species was described from Bali, Indonesia. It has since been reported from Kwajalein in the Marshall Islands.

== Description ==
This goniodorid nudibranch is black or dark grey in colour, with a pattern of white patches and thin white lines forming a network on the body. There are raised, rounded tubercles on the back and behind the gills which are white. The gills, papillae and rhinophores are translucent with white superficial pigment. The oral tentacles have the body pattern at the base and white tips.

== Ecology ==
Trapania tora feeds on Entoprocta which often grow on sponges and other living substrata.
