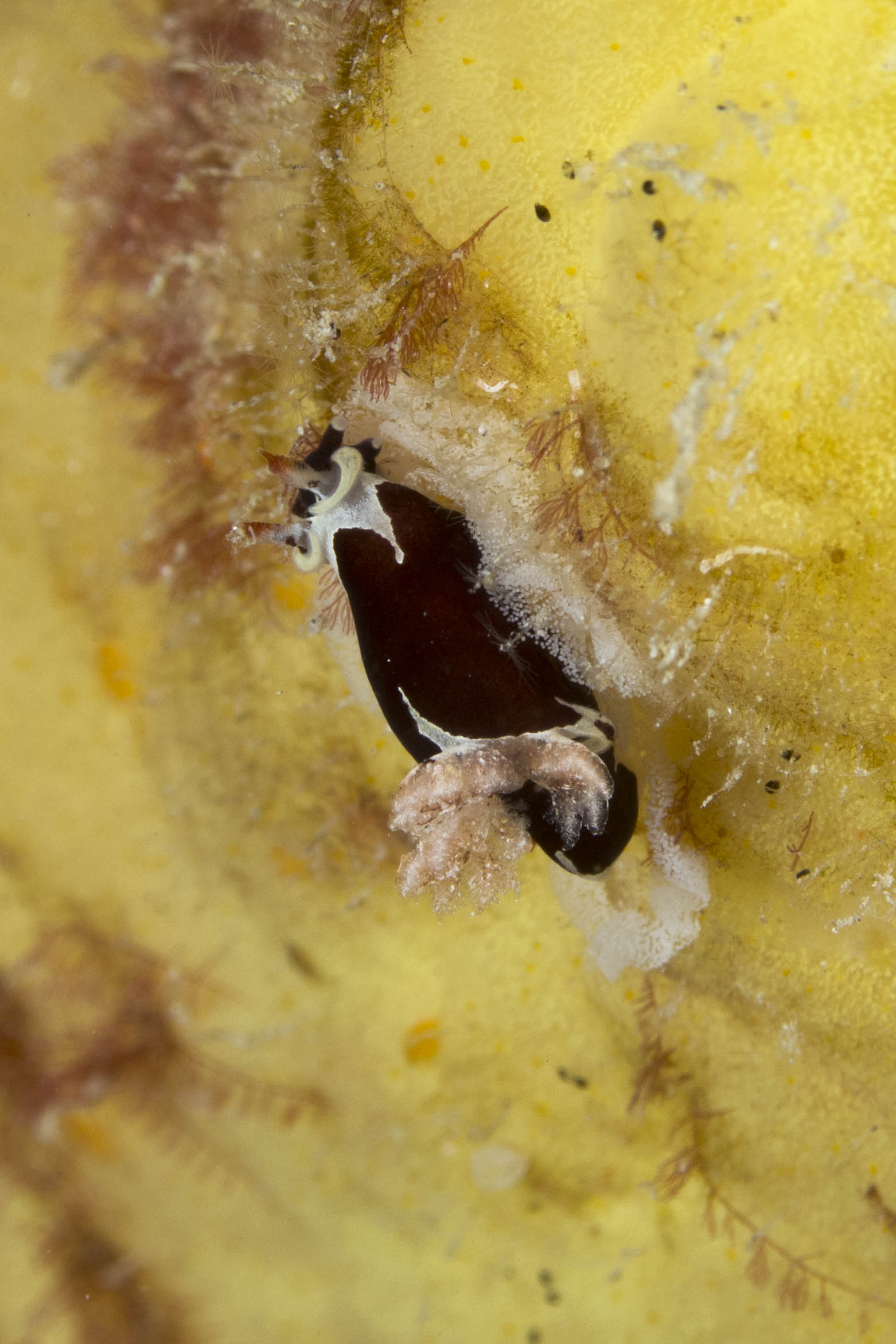

Scientific classification
- Kingdom: Animalia
- Phylum: Mollusca
- Class: Gastropoda
- Order: Nudibranchia
- Family: Goniodorididae
- Genus: Trapania
- Species: T. safracornia

Binomial name
- Trapania safracornia Fahey, 2004

= Trapania safracornia =

Species of gastropod

Trapania safracornia is a species of sea slug, a dorid nudibranch, a marine gastropod mollusc in the family Goniodorididae.

== Distribution ==
This species was described from Rottnest Island, Western Australia. It has been found at a number of sites in Western Australia.

== Description ==
The body of this goniodorid nudibranch is black or dark brown with white markings. The gills, oral tentacles and tail are tipped with white pigment. The lateral papillae are also white, sometimes with brown near the base and the body has patches of white at the base of the rhinophores and gills.

== Ecology ==
Trapania safracornia feeds on Entoprocta which often grow on sponges and other living substrata.
