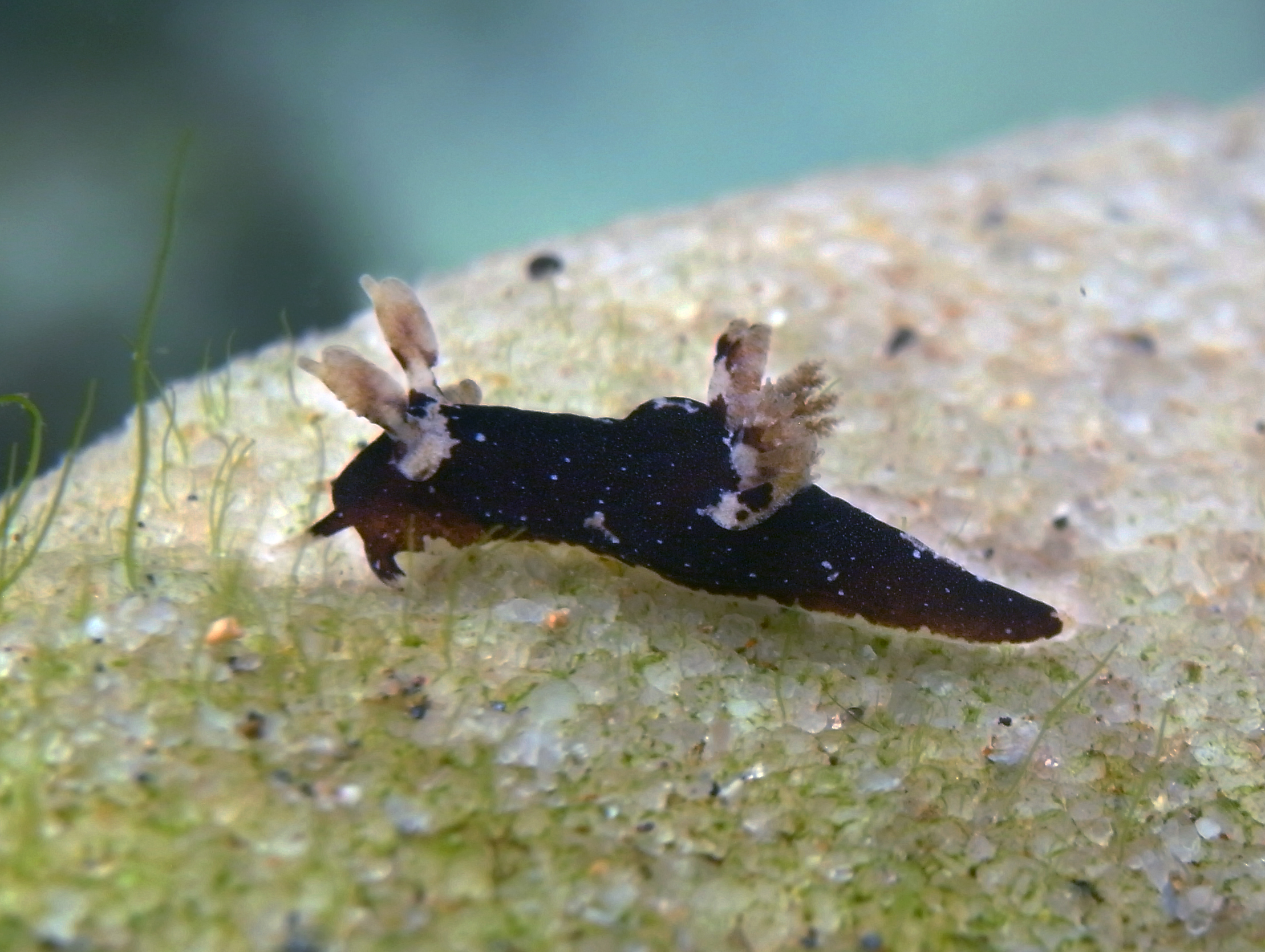

Scientific classification
- Kingdom: Animalia
- Phylum: Mollusca
- Class: Gastropoda
- Order: Nudibranchia
- Family: Goniodorididae
- Genus: Trapania
- Species: T. brunnea

Binomial name
- Trapania brunnea Rudman, 1987

= Trapania brunnea =

Species of gastropod

Trapania brunnea is a species of sea slug, a dorid nudibranch, a marine gastropod mollusc in the family Goniodorididae.

== Distribution ==
This species was described from New South Wales, Australia. It has also been reported from Victoria, Tasmania and New Zealand.

== Description ==
This goniodorid nudibranch is translucent pale brown with a meshwork pattern of darker brown covering most of the body apart from some irregular patches around the gills and rhinophores and along the midline of the back. The lateral papillae, gills and rhinophores are mostly translucent pale brown, with some brown markings.

== Ecology ==
Trapania brunnea feeds on Entoprocta which often grow on sponges and other living substrata.
