= Trapania hispalensis =

Scientific classification
- Kingdom: Animalia
- Phylum: Mollusca
- Class: Gastropoda
- Order: Nudibranchia
- Family: Goniodorididae
- Genus: Trapania
- Species: T. hispalensis

Binomial name
- Trapania hispalensis Cervera & Garcia-Gomez, 1989

Species of gastropod

Trapania hispalensis is a species of sea slug, a dorid nudibranch, a marine gastropod mollusc in the family Goniodorididae.

== Distribution ==
This species was first described from the Straits of Gibraltar. It is found from Ceuta, North Africa to Faro, Portugal.

== Description ==
This goniodorid nudibranch is translucent white in colour, with yellow markings. The rhinophores, gills and processes are covered with yellow pigment and there is a patch of yellow on the tail. It is very similar in colour to Trapania tartanella except that it has yellow markings with no tendency to become orange at the tips of the papillae, gills and rhinophores.

== Ecology ==
Trapania hispalensis feeds on Entoprocta of the genus Loxosomella which often grow on the sponges Dysidea and Sarcotragus.
