= Trapania vitta =

Scientific classification
- Kingdom: Animalia
- Phylum: Mollusca
- Class: Gastropoda
- Order: Nudibranchia
- Family: Goniodorididae
- Subfamily: Anculinae
- Genus: Trapania
- Species: T. vitta

Binomial name
- Trapania vitta Gosliner & Fahey, 2008

Species of gastropod

Trapania vitta is a species of sea slug, a dorid nudibranch, a marine gastropod mollusc in the subfamily Anculinae in the family Goniodorididae.

== Distribution ==
This species was described from Bali, Indonesia with additional material from Luzon, Philippines. It has also been reported from Queensland, East Timor and Vanuatu. Recently, they have been studied in New Caledonia as well.

T. vitta upon some coral, the Philippines.

== Description ==
The body of this goniodorid nudibranch is opaque white. The rhinophores have orange tips, and there is a stripe from the base to the tip on each of the three gill stalks. and the lateral papillae are entirely white. The oral tentacles are orange and there is usually an orange line extending from the tip of the tail partway towards the gills. Studies all describe the pro-podial tentacles ("foot corners") as purely white, though remarks within these studies reference possible variation where orange pigmentation may be present.

The coloration is highly similar to Trapania aurata except in T. aurata the lateral papillae are striped with orange, and in T. vitta they are entirely white. Trapania gibbera is another species which is mainly white, except its gill leaves are well-lined with pigment, and T. vitta only has a stripe on the stalks of each gill.

T. vitta in the Philippines.

== Ecology ==
Trapania vitta probably feeds on Entoprocta which often grow on sponges and other living substrata.
