= Trapania graeffei =

Scientific classification
- Kingdom: Animalia
- Phylum: Mollusca
- Class: Gastropoda
- Order: Nudibranchia
- Family: Goniodorididae
- Genus: Trapania
- Species: T. graeffei

Binomial name
- Trapania graeffei (Bergh, 1881)

Synonyms
- Drepania graeffei, Bergh, 1881

Species of sea slug

Trapania graeffei is a species of sea slug, a dorid nudibranch, a marine gastropod mollusc in the family Goniodorididae.

== Distribution ==
This species was described from Tergeste, Italy. It does not seem to have been seen since 1879.

== Description ==
This goniodorid nudibranch is translucent white with a rose-red tint and a scattering of brown spots all over the body. The rhinophores and gills are rose-red. "Color pellucide et clare rosaceus, supra punctis et maculis minutis fuscis ubique sparsis; appendices rhinophoriales et branchiales rosaceae."

== Ecology ==
Like other species in this genus Trapania graeffei probably feeds on Entoprocta, which often grow on sponges and other living substrata.
