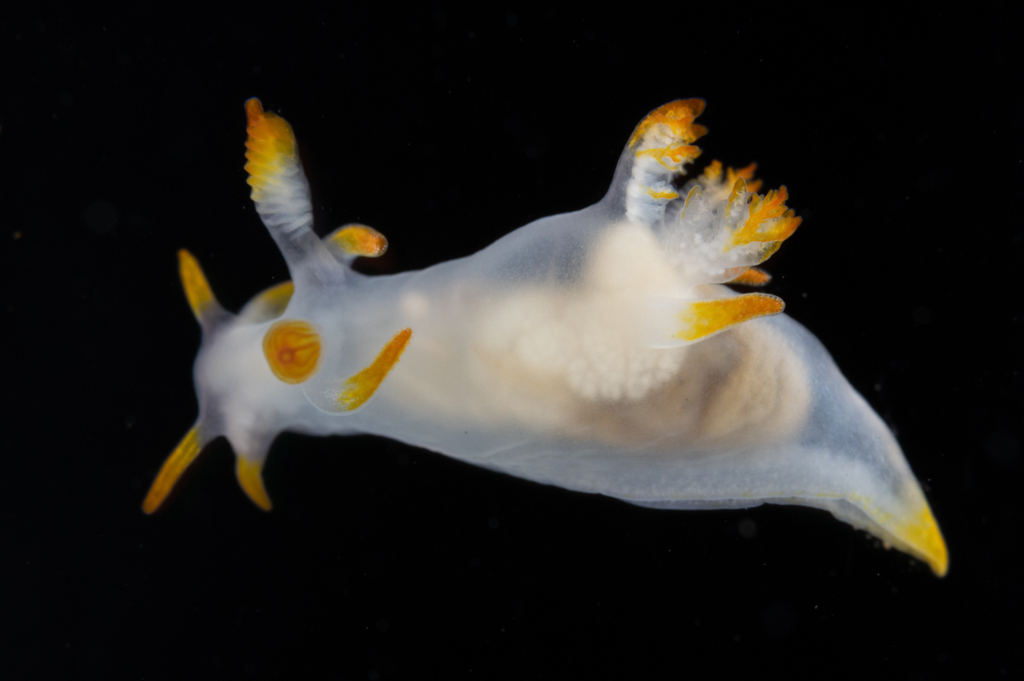

Scientific classification
- Kingdom: Animalia
- Phylum: Mollusca
- Class: Gastropoda
- Order: Nudibranchia
- Family: Goniodorididae
- Genus: Trapania
- Species: T. tartanella

Binomial name
- Trapania tartanella (H. von Ihering, 1886)

= Trapania tartanella =

Species of gastropod

Trapania tartanella is a species of sea slug, a dorid nudibranch, a marine gastropod mollusc in the family Goniodorididae.

== Distribution ==
This species was first described from the Mediterranean. It is found on the Atlantic coast from Portugal to Pembrokeshire in South Wales.

== Description ==
This goniodorid nudibranch is translucent white in colour, with yellow-orange markings. The rhinophores, gills and processes are tipped with yellow pigment which becomes orange at the extremities. It is very similar in colour to Trapania hispalensis except that in that species the yellow markings are uniform in colour.

== Ecology ==
Trapania tartanella feeds on Entoprocta which often grow on sponges.
