= Trapania orteai =

Scientific classification
- Kingdom: Animalia
- Phylum: Mollusca
- Class: Gastropoda
- Order: Nudibranchia
- Family: Goniodorididae
- Genus: Trapania
- Species: T. orteai

Binomial name
- Trapania orteai Garcia-Gomez & Cervera in Cervera & Garcia-Gomez, 1989

Species of gastropod

Trapania orteai is a species of sea slug, a dorid nudibranch, a marine gastropod mollusc in the family Goniodorididae.

== Distribution ==
This species was first described from the Straits of Gibraltar. It has also been reported from Sant'Agnello, Italy.

== Description ==
The body of this goniodorid nudibranch is translucent white in colour, with elongate orange spots. The rhinophores and gills are yellow-brown and there is a patch of orange grading to yellow on the tail. The oral tentacles and lateral papillae are yellow with white bases and a hint of orange at the base of the yellow.

== Ecology ==
Trapania orteai probably feeds on Entoprocta which often grow on sponges.
