= Trapania caerulea =

Scientific classification
- Kingdom: Animalia
- Phylum: Mollusca
- Class: Gastropoda
- Order: Nudibranchia
- Family: Goniodorididae
- Genus: Trapania
- Species: T. caerulea

Binomial name
- Trapania caerulea Gosliner & Fahey, 2008

Species of gastropod

Trapania caerulea is a species of sea slug, a dorid nudibranch, a marine gastropod mollusc in the family Goniodorididae.

== Distribution ==
This species was first described from Bali, Indonesia.

== Description ==
This goniodorid nudibranch is translucent blue in colour, mostly obscured by opaque white surface pigment. The gills and rhinophores are brown. There are two thin brown lines running from behind the rhinophores to the sides of the body where they follow the mantle edge and join behind the gills.

== Ecology ==
Trapania caerulea probably feeds on Entoprocta which often grow on sponges and other living substrata.
