= Trapania africana =

Scientific classification
- Kingdom: Animalia
- Phylum: Mollusca
- Class: Gastropoda
- Order: Nudibranchia
- Family: Goniodorididae
- Genus: Trapania
- Species: T. africana

Binomial name
- Trapania africana Edmunds, 2009

Species of gastropod

Trapania africana is a species of sea slug, a dorid nudibranch, a marine gastropod mollusc in the family Goniodorididae.

== Distribution ==
This species was first described from Kpone Bay, Ghana. It was collected by W. Pople during survey work in the Tema area, 35 km east of Accra.

== Description ==
This goniodorid nudibranch is translucent white in colour, with conspicuous yellow spots on the body and small freckles of white and maroon. The papillae beside the rhinophores and beside the gills are maroon. There are yellow spots at the bases of the papillae and the base of the oral tentacles is yellow.

== Ecology ==
Trapania africana probably feeds on Entoprocta which often grow on sponges and other living substrata.
