= Trapania circinata =

Scientific classification
- Kingdom: Animalia
- Phylum: Mollusca
- Class: Gastropoda
- Order: Nudibranchia
- Family: Goniodorididae
- Genus: Trapania
- Species: T. circinata

Binomial name
- Trapania circinata Gosliner & Fahey, 2008

Species of gastropod

Trapania circinata is a species of sea slug, a dorid nudibranch, a marine gastropod mollusc in the family Goniodorididae.

== Distribution ==
This species was first described on the Marshall Islands.

== Description ==
This goniodorid nudibranch is translucent white in colour. The oral tentacles and rhinophores are black and the lateral papillae and gills are translucent with black spots.

== Ecology ==
Trapania circinata probably feeds on Entoprocta which often grow on sponges and other living substrata.
