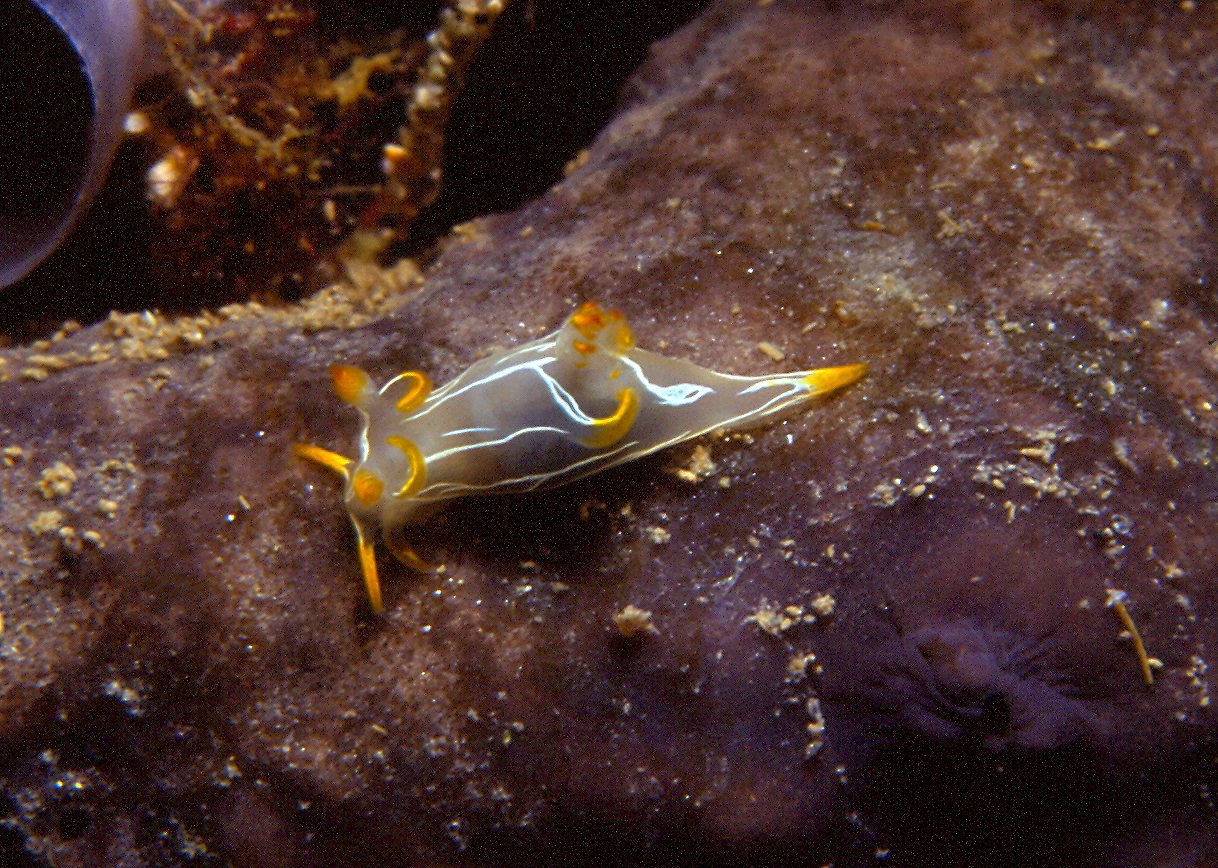
- Trapania lineata crawling across a sponge

Scientific classification
- Kingdom: Animalia
- Phylum: Mollusca
- Class: Gastropoda
- Order: Nudibranchia
- Family: Goniodorididae
- Genus: Trapania
- Species: T. lineata

Binomial name
- Trapania lineata Haefelfinger, 1960

= Trapania lineata =

Species of gastropod

Trapania lineata is a species of sea slug, a dorid nudibranch, a marine gastropod mollusc in the family Goniodorididae.

== Distribution ==
This species was first described from Villefranche-sur-Mer in the Mediterranean Sea. It is found from Antalya, Turkey to Spain.

== Description ==
The length of the body attains 15 mm. This goniodorid nudibranch is translucent white in colour, with a pattern of opaque white lines on the body and running into the lateral papillae. The oral tentacles, rhinophores, gills and lateral processes are tipped with yellow-orange pigment. There is a narrow white stripe along the tail which becomes an orange tip.

== Ecology ==
Trapania lineata feeds on Entoprocta which often grow on sponges.
