= Trapania goddardi =

Scientific classification
- Kingdom: Animalia
- Phylum: Mollusca
- Class: Gastropoda
- Order: Nudibranchia
- Family: Goniodorididae
- Genus: Trapania
- Species: T. goddardi

Binomial name
- Trapania goddardi Hermosillo & Valdes, 2004

Species of gastropod

Trapania goddardi is a species of sea slug, a dorid nudibranch, a marine gastropod mollusc in the family Goniodorididae.

== Distribution ==
This species was first described from Bahía de Banderas, Mexico.

== Description ==
The body of this goniodorid nudibranch attains 7 mm. It is translucent white in colour, with pale brown mottling and darker brown patches of surface pigment. The lateral papillae, oral tentacles, gills and rhinophores are mottled with light and dark brown like the body.

== Ecology ==
Trapania goddardi probably feeds on Entoprocta which often grow on sponges and other living substrata.
