= Trapania squama =

Scientific classification
- Kingdom: Animalia
- Phylum: Mollusca
- Class: Gastropoda
- Order: Nudibranchia
- Family: Goniodorididae
- Genus: Trapania
- Species: T. squama

Binomial name
- Trapania squama Gosliner & Fahey 2008

Species of gastropod

Trapania squama is a species of sea slug, a dorid nudibranch, a marine gastropod mollusc in the family Goniodorididae.

== Distribution ==
This species was described from Madang, Papua New Guinea. It has also been reported from the Marshall Islands.

== Description ==
The body of this goniodorid nudibranch has a pattern of white patches with thin lines of dark brown between them, giving a scaled appearance. The network of brown lines forms small square or diamond shapes where the lines intersect. The gills and rhinophores are transparent with white surface pigment and the lateral papillae are white. The oral tentacles are white or mottled white and brown in the holotype.

== Ecology ==
The animals from the Marshall Islands apparently feed on a species of bryozoan.
