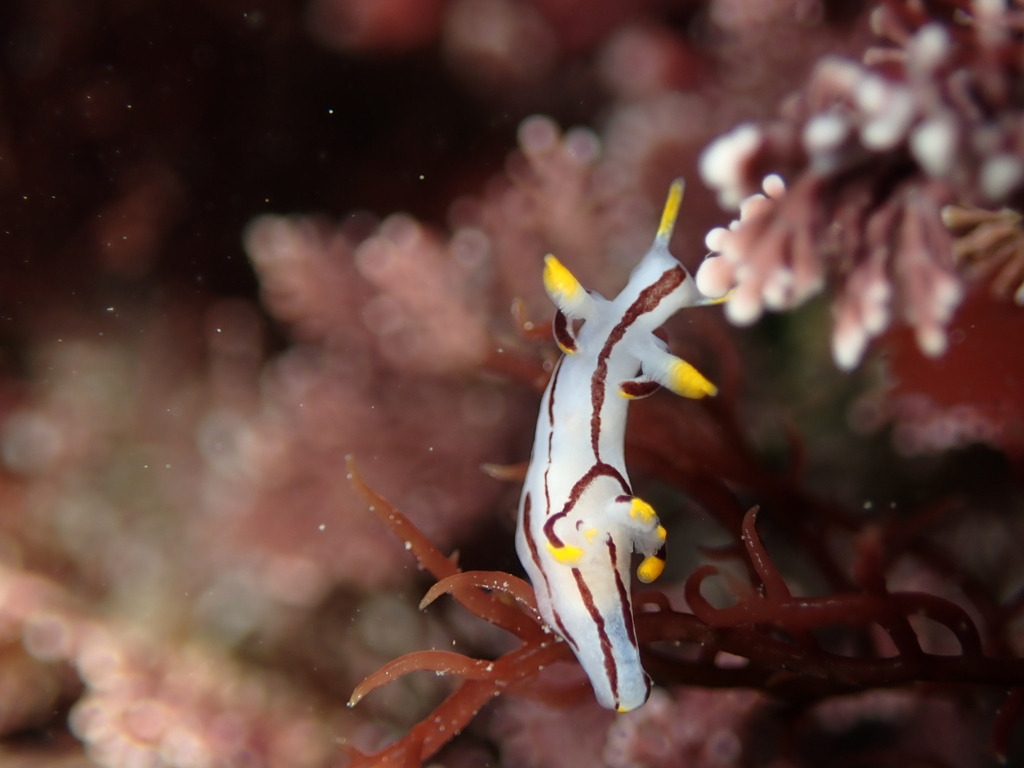

Scientific classification
- Kingdom: Animalia
- Phylum: Mollusca
- Class: Gastropoda
- Order: Nudibranchia
- Family: Goniodorididae
- Genus: Trapania
- Species: T. velox

Binomial name
- Trapania velox (Cockerell, 1901)

Synonyms
- Thecacera velox Cockerell, 1901 original combination

= Trapania velox =

Species of gastropod

Trapania velox is a species of sea slug, a dorid nudibranch, a marine gastropod mollusc in the family Goniodorididae.

== Distribution ==
This species was described from La Jolla, California. It has since been reported from California south to Bahia Tortugas, Baja California, Mexico.

== Description ==
This goniodorid nudibranch is translucent white in colour, with a pattern dark brown lines forming a loose network on the body. The tips of the rhinophores, oral tentacles, gills, tail and lateral papillae are tipped with yellow.

== Ecology ==
Trapania velox probably feeds on Entoprocta which often grow on sponges and other living substrata.
