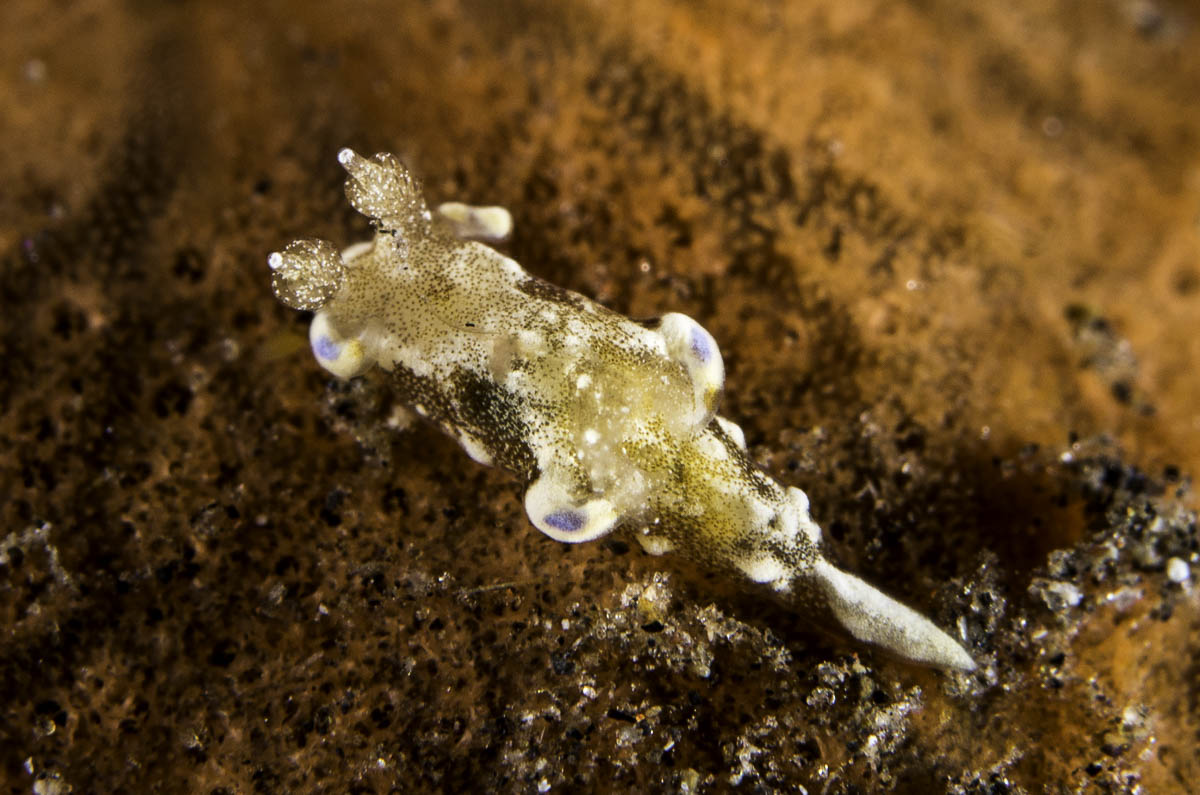
- The nudibranch Trapania palmula, Tulamben, Bali, Indonesia.

Scientific classification
- Kingdom: Animalia
- Phylum: Mollusca
- Class: Gastropoda
- Order: Nudibranchia
- Family: Goniodorididae
- Subfamily: Anculinae
- Genus: Trapania
- Species: T. palmula

Binomial name
- Trapania palmula Gosliner & Fahey, 2008

= Trapania palmula =

Species of gastropod

Trapania palmula is a species of sea slug, a dorid nudibranch, a marine gastropod mollusc in the family Goniodorididae.

== Distribution ==
This species was described from Luzon, Philippines. It is also found in Indonesia and southern Japan.

Three T. palmula. Leftmost of smallest size, facing away from camera. Middle of largest size, head at left end of body. Rightmost of middle size, head at left end of body.

== Description ==
This species of Trapania is unusual in having raised rounded tubercles all over the body. It is translucent white in colour with dense speckling of brown and some larger brown patches. While there can be variation in the density of patching and depth of pigmentation, the lateral papillae always have a patch of white surrounding a blue diagonal streak, and the oral tentacles are always tipped in dark yellow, with a dark brown band below.

T. palmula, head towards right

== Ecology ==
Trapania palmula feeds on Entoprocta which often grow on sponges and other living substrata.
