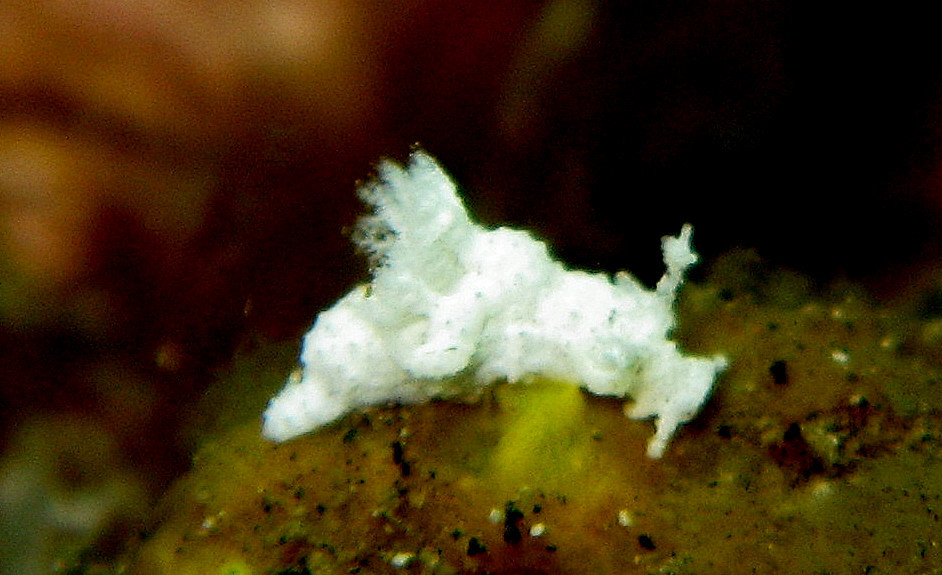

Scientific classification
- Kingdom: Animalia
- Phylum: Mollusca
- Class: Gastropoda
- Order: Nudibranchia
- Family: Goniodorididae
- Genus: Trapania
- Species: T. armilla

Binomial name
- Trapania armilla Gosliner & Fahey, 2008

= Trapania armilla =

Species of gastropod

Trapania armilla is a species of sea slug, a dorid nudibranch, a marine gastropod mollusc in the family Goniodorididae.

== Distribution ==
This species was first described from Bali, Indonesia.

== Description ==
This goniodorid nudibranch is opaque white in colour, with a thin brown ring halfway along the oral tentacles. The gills are unusually large for a Trapania and the body is covered with raised irregular bumps.

== Ecology ==
Trapania armilla probably feeds on Entoprocta, which often grow on sponges and other living substrata.
