= Trapania maringa =

Scientific classification
- Kingdom: Animalia
- Phylum: Mollusca
- Class: Gastropoda
- Order: Nudibranchia
- Family: Goniodorididae
- Genus: Trapania
- Species: T. maringa

Binomial name
- Trapania maringa Er. Marcus, 1957

Species of gastropod

Trapania maringa is a species of sea slug, a dorid nudibranch, a marine gastropod mollusc in the family Goniodorididae.

== Distribution ==
This species was first described from 14 km. west of Ubatuba, Sao Paulo, Brazil, where it was found amongst algae on the upper shore, in July and September 1955.

== Description ==
This goniodorid nudibranch is translucent white with an irregular network of dark brown pigment just beneath the skin.

The maximum recorded body length is ten mm.

== Ecology ==
Minimum recorded depth is 0 m. Maximum recorded depth is 0 m.

Trapania maringa probably feeds on Entoprocta which often grow on sponges and other living substrata.
