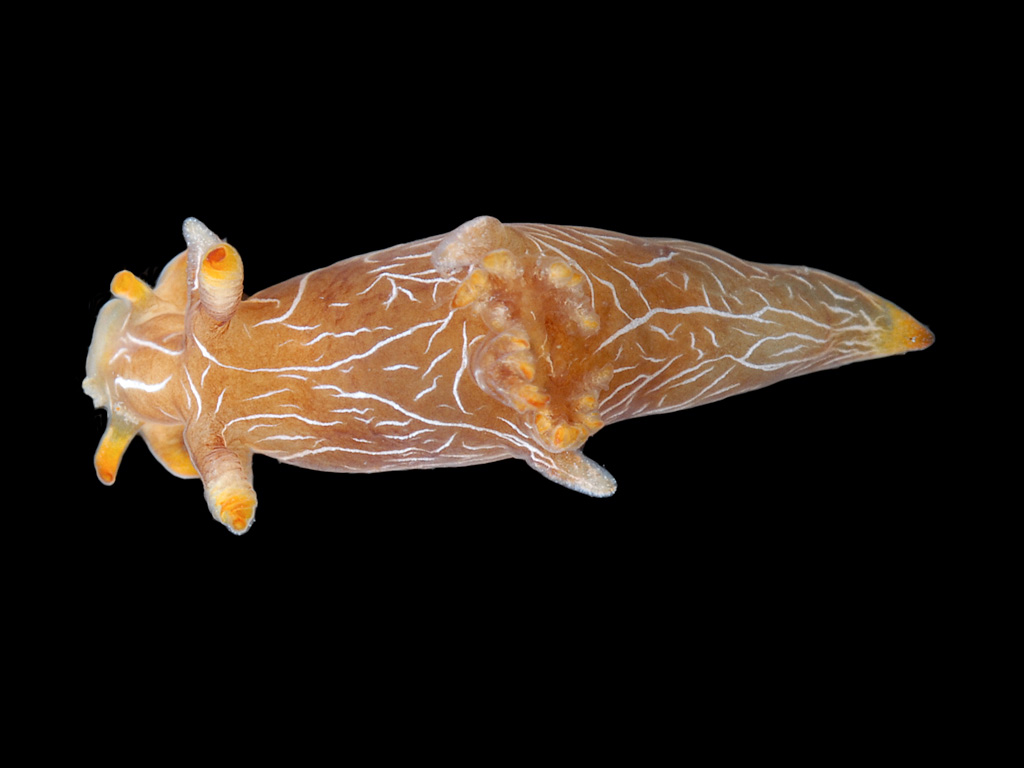
- The nudibranch Trapania cirrita, Mossel Bay, South Africa

Scientific classification
- Kingdom: Animalia
- Phylum: Mollusca
- Class: Gastropoda
- Order: Nudibranchia
- Family: Goniodorididae
- Subfamily: Anculinae
- Genus: Trapania
- Species: T. cirrita

Binomial name
- Trapania cirrita Gosliner & Fahey, 2008

= Trapania cirrita =

Species of gastropod

Trapania cirrita is a species of sea slug, a dorid nudibranch, a marine gastropod mollusc in the subfamily Anculinae in the family Goniodorididae.

== Distribution ==
This species was first described from South Africa.

== Description ==
This goniodorid nudibranch is translucent brown in colour, with an irregular network of short white lines on the body.

T. cirrita, South Africa

== Ecology ==
Trapania cirrita probably feeds on Entoprocta which often grow on sponges and other living substrata.
