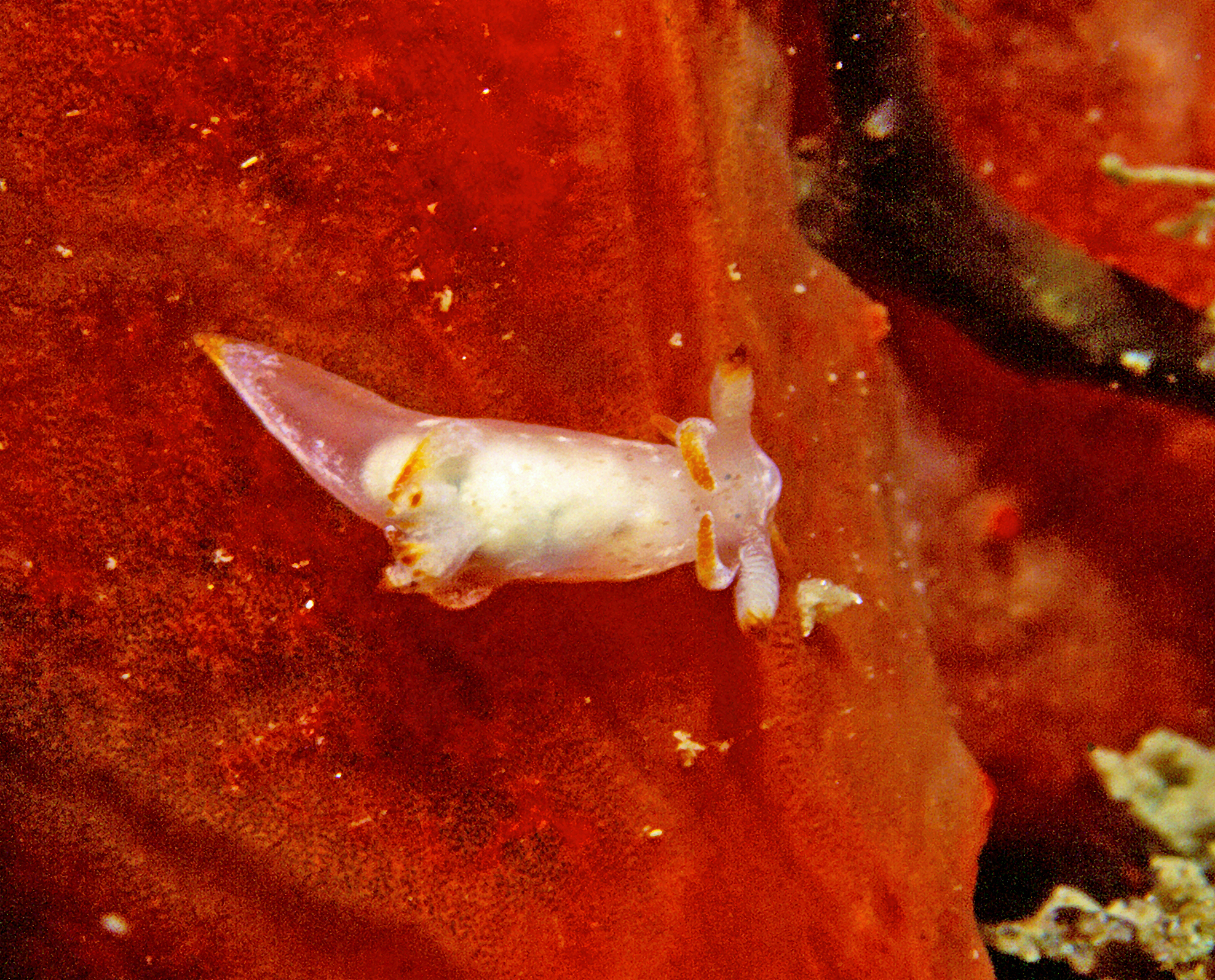

Scientific classification
- Kingdom: Animalia
- Phylum: Mollusca
- Class: Gastropoda
- Order: Nudibranchia
- Family: Goniodorididae
- Genus: Trapania
- Species: T. fusca

Binomial name
- Trapania fusca (Lafont, 1874)

Synonyms
- Drepania fusca, Lafont, 1874

= Trapania fusca =

Species of gastropod

Trapania fusca is a species of sea slug, a dorid nudibranch, a marine gastropod mollusc in the family Goniodorididae.

== Distribution ==
This species was described from the Bay of Arcachon, France where it was found commonly beneath oyster trestles. It has also been reported from the Mediterranean Sea.

== Description ==
This goniodorid nudibranch is translucent white with a pattern of brown spots forming regular patches on the body. The head, rhinophore lamellae and lateral papillae are mostly opaque white. There are yellow markings on the rhinophores and the oral tentacles and tail are yellow with a white tip.

== Ecology ==
Trapania fusca probably feeds on Entoprocta, which often grow on sponges and other living substrata.
