= Trapania nebula =

Scientific classification
- Kingdom: Animalia
- Phylum: Mollusca
- Class: Gastropoda
- Order: Nudibranchia
- Family: Goniodorididae
- Genus: Trapania
- Species: T. nebula

Binomial name
- Trapania nebula Gosliner & Fahey, 2008

Species of gastropod

Trapania nebula is a species of sea slug, a dorid nudibranch, a marine gastropod mollusc in the family Goniodorididae.

== Distribution ==
This species was described from Madang, Papua New Guinea.

== Description ==
This goniodorid nudibranch is translucent grey-brown with an irregular pattern of white covering most of the body. The rhinophores and gills are edged with yellow or orange.

== Ecology ==
Trapania nebula probably feeds on Entoprocta which often grow on sponges and other living substrata.
