= Trapania melaina =

Scientific classification
- Kingdom: Animalia
- Phylum: Mollusca
- Class: Gastropoda
- Order: Nudibranchia
- Family: Goniodorididae
- Genus: Trapania
- Species: T. melaina

Binomial name
- Trapania melaina Gosliner & Fahey, 2008

Species of gastropod

Trapania melaina is a species of sea slug, a dorid nudibranch, a marine gastropod mollusc in the family Goniodorididae.

== Distribution ==
This species was first described from Sodwana Bay, South Africa.

== Description ==
This goniodorid nudibranch is black in colour with a fine speckling of cream spots. The oral tentacles, lateral papillae, tail and rhinophores are tipped with orange and the gills are translucent with small yellow and black spots.

== Ecology ==
Trapania melaina probably feeds on Entoprocta which often grow on sponges and other living substrata.
