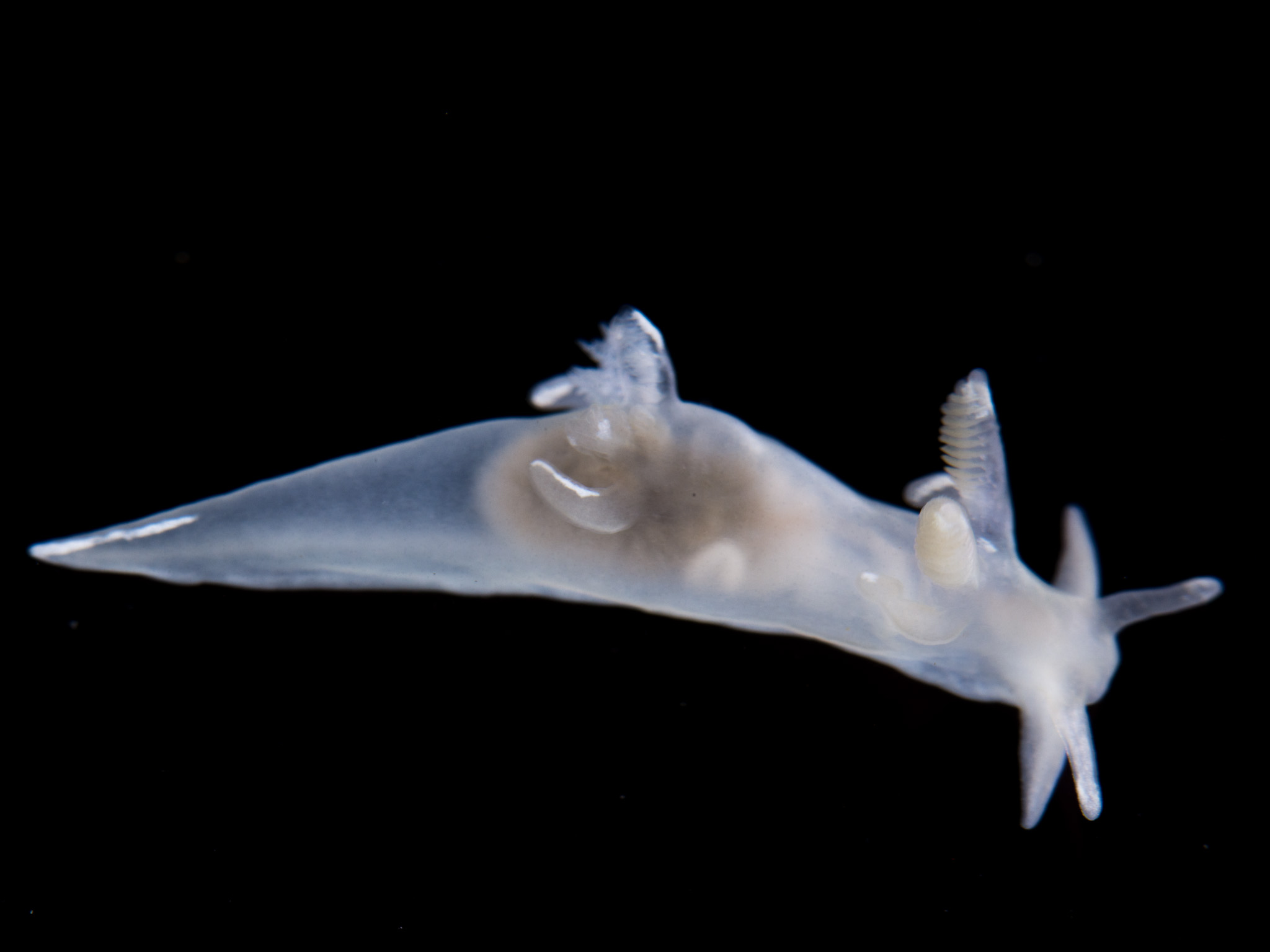
- The nudibranch Trapania pallida, Connemara, Ireland

Scientific classification
- Kingdom: Animalia
- Phylum: Mollusca
- Class: Gastropoda
- Order: Nudibranchia
- Family: Goniodorididae
- Genus: Trapania
- Species: T. pallida

Binomial name
- Trapania pallida Kress, 1968

= Trapania pallida =

Species of gastropod

Trapania pallida is a species of sea slug, a dorid nudibranch, a marine gastropod mollusc in the family Goniodorididae.

== Distribution ==
This species was first described from Plymouth, England and it is found as far north as western Scotland. It has subsequently been reported from Atlantic coasts as far south as Portugal and in the Mediterranean Sea as far east as Cagnes-sur-Mer.

== Description ==
This goniodorid nudibranch is translucent white in colour, with white markings. The rhinophores, gills and processes are covered with white pigment. There is a white stripe along the tail, starting somewhere behind the gills and running to the tip. In Mediterranean specimens there is more white, with some markings on the sides of the body.

== Ecology ==
Trapania pallida feeds on Entoprocta which often grow on sponges and other living substrata.
