= Trapania sanctipetrensis =

Scientific classification
- Kingdom: Animalia
- Phylum: Mollusca
- Class: Gastropoda
- Order: Nudibranchia
- Family: Goniodorididae
- Genus: Trapania
- Species: T. sanctipetrensis

Binomial name
- Trapania sanctipetrensis Cervera, Garcia-Gomez & Megina, 2000

Species of gastropod

Trapania Sanctipetrensis is a species of sea slug, a dorid nudibranch, a marine gastropod mollusc in the family Goniodorididae.

== Distribution ==
This species was described from Sancti-Petri, Chiclana de la Frontera, Bay of Cadiz, south west Spain.

== Description ==
The body of the Trapania Sanctipetrensis is translucent white with a network of brown markings on the surface. The gills, oral tentacles and tail are tipped with white pigment. It grows to at least 8mm.

== Ecology ==
Trapania sanctipetrensis probably feeds on Entoprocta which often grow on sponges and other living substrata but it was found on Bugula neritina.
