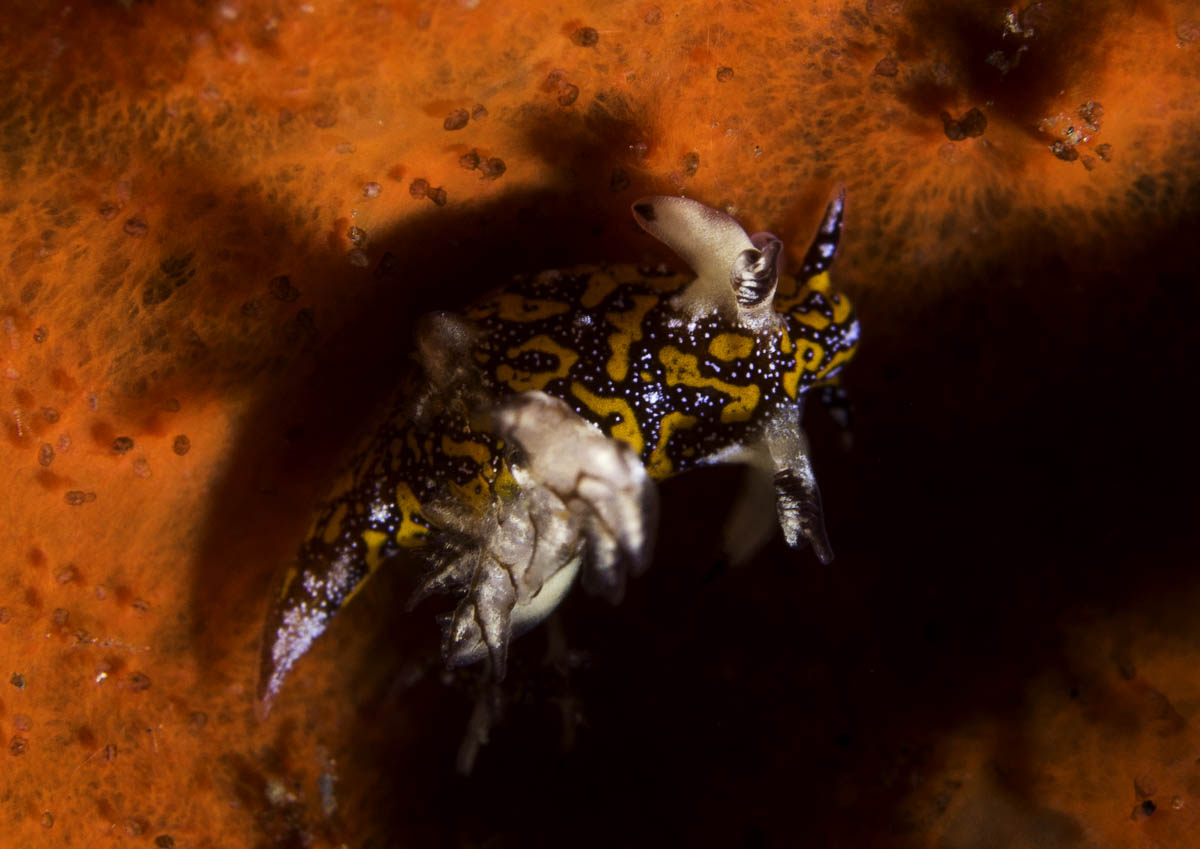
- The nudibranch Trapania miltabrancha, Tulamben, Bali, Indonesia.

Scientific classification
- Kingdom: Animalia
- Phylum: Mollusca
- Class: Gastropoda
- Order: Nudibranchia
- Family: Goniodorididae
- Genus: Trapania
- Species: T. miltabrancha

Binomial name
- Trapania miltabrancha Gosliner & Fahey, 2008

= Trapania miltabrancha =

Species of mollusc

Trapania miltabrancha is a species of sea slug, a dorid nudibranch, a marine gastropod mollusc in the family Goniodorididae.

== Distribution ==
This species was first described from Bali. It has subsequently been reported from the Philippines.

== Description ==
This goniodorid nudibranch has a complicated colour pattern. The body is a mosaic of brown patches which contain white spots, interspersed with orange. The rhinophores, lateral papillae and gills are cream with brown patches.

== Ecology ==
Trapania miltabrancha feeds on Entoprocta which often grow on sponges, algae and other living substrata.
