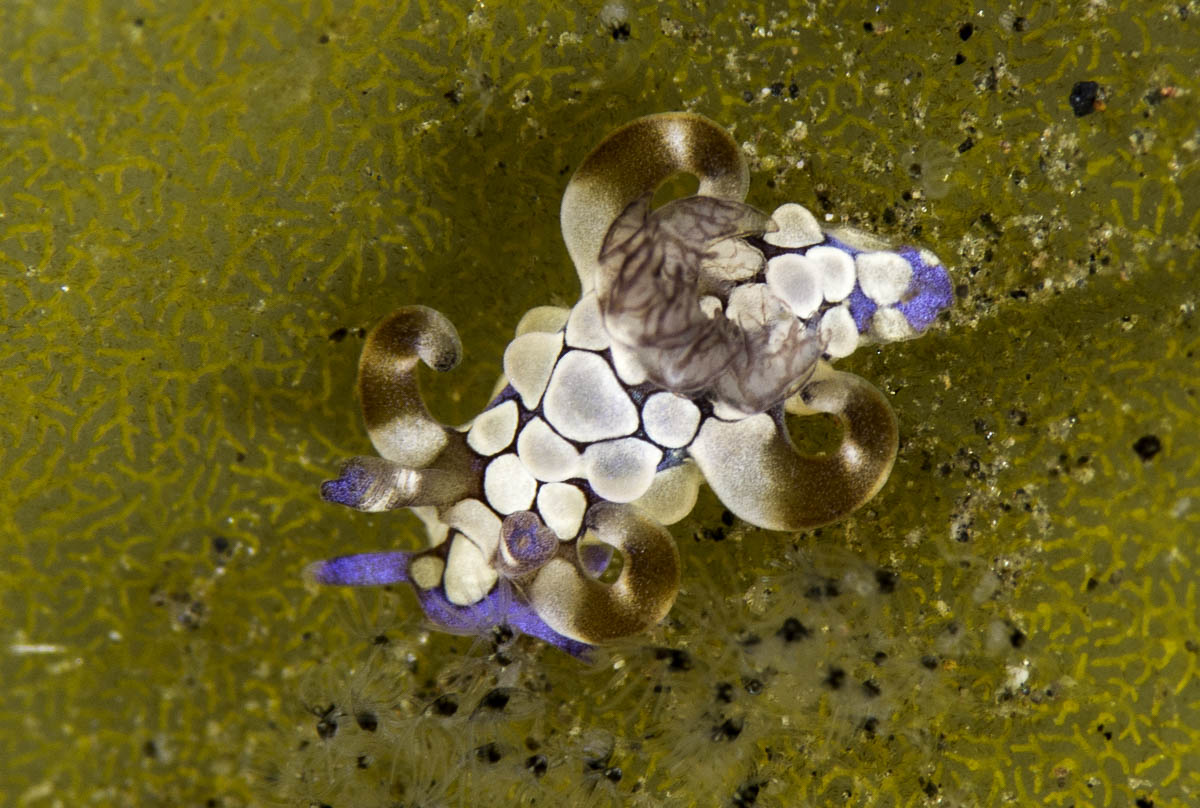
- The nudibranch Trapania scurra, Bontoh Village, Sangeang, Indonesia

Scientific classification
- Kingdom: Animalia
- Phylum: Mollusca
- Class: Gastropoda
- Order: Nudibranchia
- Family: Goniodorididae
- Genus: Trapania
- Species: T. scurra

Binomial name
- Trapania scurra Gosliner & Fahey, 2008

= Trapania scurra =

Species of gastropod

Trapania scurra is a species of sea slug, a dorid nudibranch, a marine gastropod mollusc in the family Goniodorididae.

== Distribution ==
This species was described from Luzon Island, Philippines. It has also been reported from Malaysia, Indonesia, the Marshall Islands and Japan.

== Description ==
This goniodorid nudibranch is pale purple, with a pattern of white patches with thin lines of purple between them on the body. The gills and rhinophores are purple and the large lateral papillae are white with brown bands. The oral tentacles and adjacent part of the head are blue. The single animal known from the Marshall Islands has larger white patches and orange lateral papillae.

== Ecology ==
Trapania scurra feeds on Entoprocta which often grow on sponges and other living substrata.
