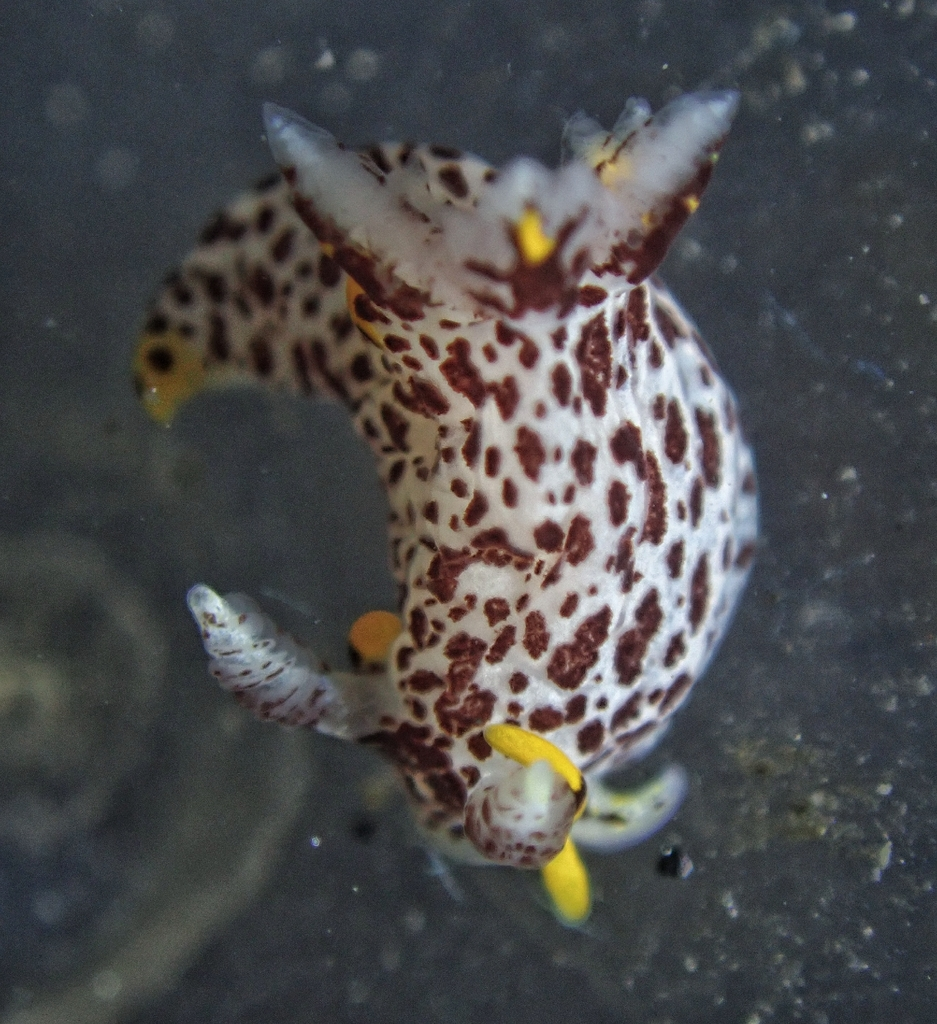

Scientific classification
- Kingdom: Animalia
- Phylum: Mollusca
- Class: Gastropoda
- Order: Nudibranchia
- Family: Goniodorididae
- Genus: Trapania
- Species: T. inbiotica

Binomial name
- Trapania inbiotica Camacho-Garcia & Ortea, 2000

= Trapania inbiotica =

Species of gastropod

Trapania inbiotica is a species of sea slug, a dorid nudibranch, a marine gastropod mollusc in the family Goniodorididae.

== Distribution ==
This species was described from Cabo Blanco, Puntarenas, Costa Rica and from Islas Secas, Panama.

== Description ==
The body of this goniodorid nudibranch is translucent white with red patches composed of small red dots partly coalesced into irregular shaped spots. The rhinophores and gills are white with a few smaller red spots. The oral tentacles, lateral papillae, gills, and tail have red spots at the base and yellow tips.

== Ecology ==
Like other species in this genus Trapania inbiotica probably feeds on Entoprocta, which often grow on sponges and other living substrata.
