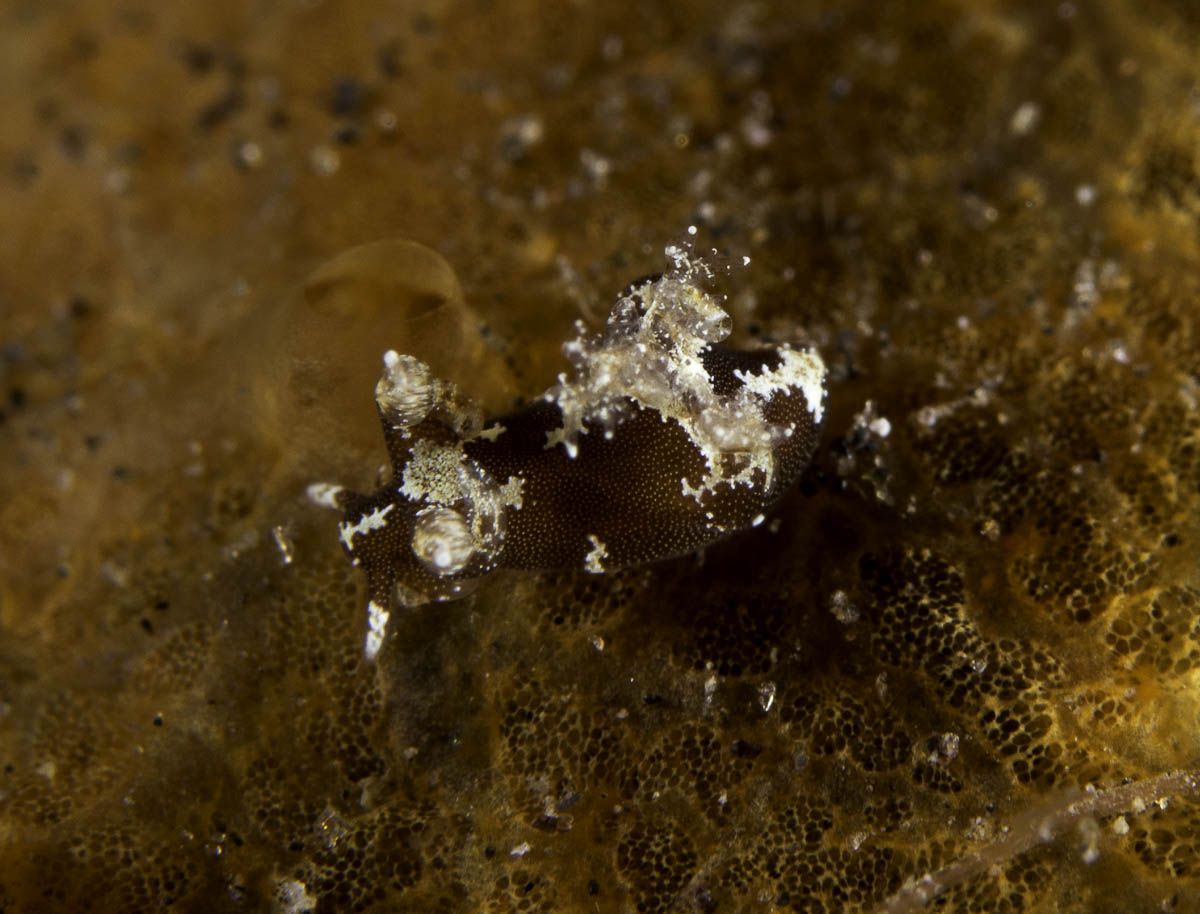
- The nudibranch Trapania euryeia, The River, Tulamben, Bali, Indonesia.

Scientific classification
- Kingdom: Animalia
- Phylum: Mollusca
- Class: Gastropoda
- Order: Nudibranchia
- Family: Goniodorididae
- Genus: Trapania
- Species: T. euryeia

Binomial name
- Trapania euryeia Gosliner & Fahey, 2008

= Trapania euryeia =

Species of gastropod

Trapania euryeia is a species of sea slug, a dorid nudibranch, a marine gastropod mollusc in the family Goniodorididae.

== Distribution ==
This species was described from Madang, Papua New Guinea. The original description included specimens from Réunion, Indonesia (Sulawesi and Bali), Okinawa, the Marshall Islands, Midway Atoll and Hawaii. It has subsequently been reported from places all across the Indian and Pacific Oceans, including Luzon, Philippines and South Africa.

== Description ==
This goniodorid nudibranch is white, cream or pale yellow in colour, with a pattern of brown patches with fractal-like edges on the body. The gills, papillae and rhinophores are white flecked with brown. The oral tentacles are either orange or white and brown. This species is quite variable across its wide range and may prove to be a species complex.

== Ecology ==
Trapania euryeia probably feeds on Entoprocta which often grow on sponges and other living substrata.
