= Trapania canaria =

Scientific classification
- Kingdom: Animalia
- Phylum: Mollusca
- Class: Gastropoda
- Order: Nudibranchia
- Family: Goniodorididae
- Genus: Trapania
- Species: T. canaria

Binomial name
- Trapania canaria Ortea & Moro, 2009

Species of gastropod

Trapania canaria is a species of sea slug, a dorid nudibranch, a marine gastropod mollusc in the family Goniodorididae.

== Distribution ==
This species was first described from Taliarte, Telde, Gran Canaria.

== Description ==
This goniodorid nudibranch is translucent white in colour, mostly covered by small spots of chestnut brown surface pigment. These spots coalesce into darker patches at the sides of the back, behind the rhinophores and in two patches on each side, behind the gills. There are opaque white spots on the head, sides of the body, lateral papillae, oral tentacles and rhinophores.

== Ecology ==
Trapania canaria probably feeds on Entoprocta which often grow on sponges and other living substrata.
