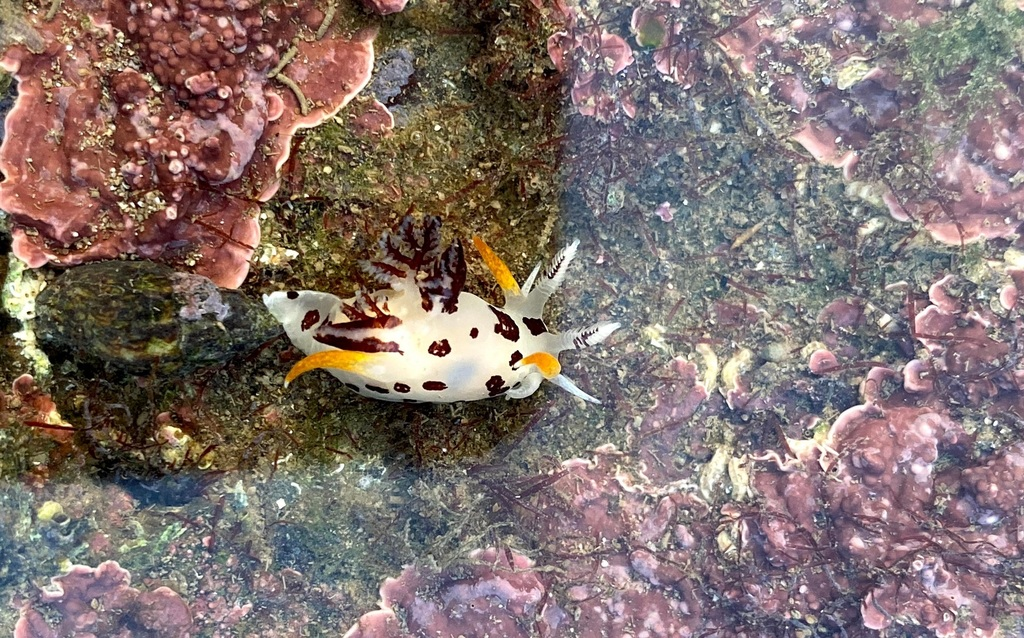

Scientific classification
- Kingdom: Animalia
- Phylum: Mollusca
- Class: Gastropoda
- Order: Nudibranchia
- Family: Goniodorididae
- Subfamily: Anculinae
- Genus: Trapania
- Species: T. japonica

Binomial name
- Trapania japonica Baba, 1935

Synonyms
- Drepania japonica Baba, 1935

= Trapania japonica =

Species of gastropod

Trapania japonica is a species of sea slug, a dorid nudibranch, a marine gastropod mollusc in the family Goniodorididae.

== Distribution ==
This species was first described from Japan. It is also known from Hong Kong, the Philippines, Indonesia and Queensland, Australia.

== Description ==
The length of body attains 10 mm. This goniodorid nudibranch is white in color, with a pattern of large dark brown spots on the body and long yellow lateral papillae. The oral tentacles are entirely dark brown and the rhinophores and gills are tipped with brown pigment.

== Ecology ==
Trapania japonica probably feeds on Entoprocta which often grow on sponges.
