= Trapania bonellenae =

Scientific classification
- Kingdom: Animalia
- Phylum: Mollusca
- Class: Gastropoda
- Order: Nudibranchia
- Family: Goniodorididae
- Genus: Trapania
- Species: T. bonellenae

Binomial name
- Trapania bonellenae Valdés, 2009

Species of gastropod

Trapania bonellenae is a species of sea slug, a dorid nudibranch, a marine gastropod mollusc in the family Goniodorididae.

== Distribution ==
This species was described from Bonaire.

== Description ==
The body of this goniodorid nudibranch is black with a tracery of fine interlinked white lines. The gills, rhinophores, lateral papillae and oral tentacles are translucent with black and white spots. There are white bands across the body between the rhinophores and in front of the gills.

== Ecology ==
Trapania bonellenae feeds on Entoprocta which often grow on sponges and other living substrata.
