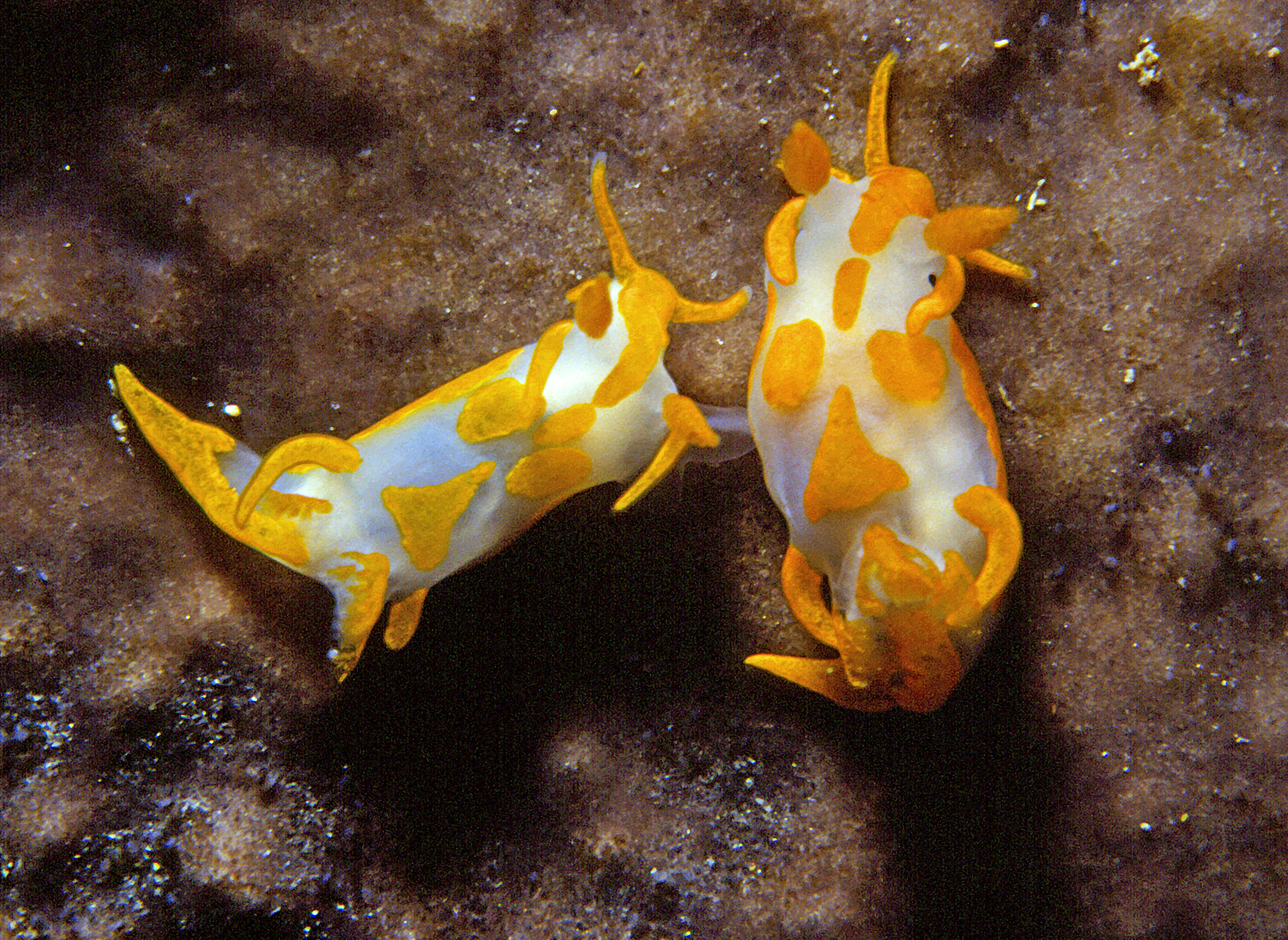
- Two Trapania maculata initiating copulation

Scientific classification
- Kingdom: Animalia
- Phylum: Mollusca
- Class: Gastropoda
- Order: Nudibranchia
- Family: Goniodorididae
- Genus: Trapania
- Species: T. maculata

Binomial name
- Trapania maculata Haefelfinger, 1960

= Trapania maculata =

Species of gastropod

Trapania maculata is a species of sea slug, a dorid nudibranch, a marine gastropod mollusc in the family Goniodorididae.

== Distribution ==
This species was first described from Villefranche-sur-Mer in the Mediterranean Sea. It is found from the Aegean Sea coast of Turkey to the Strait of Gibraltar. It has subsequently been reported from Atlantic coasts as far north as SW England and Wales, United Kingdom.

== Description ==
This goniodorid nudibranch is translucent white in colour, with yellow markings. The rhinophores, gills and processes are covered with yellow pigment and there is a triangular patch of yellow in the middle of the back. There is a broad yellow stripe along the tail, from behind the gills to the tip. In Mediterranean specimens there is more yellow, with patches on the head and sides of the body.

== Ecology ==
Trapania maculata feeds on Entoprocta of the genus Loxosomella which often grow on the sponges Dysidea and Sarcotragus.
