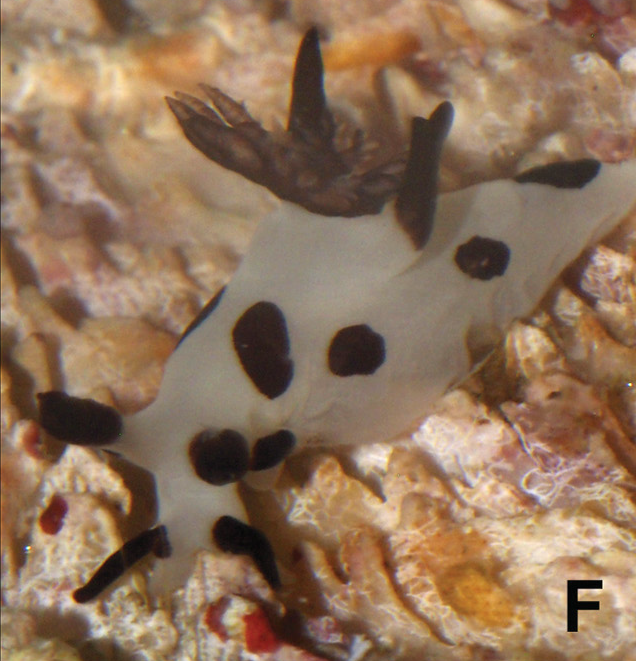

Scientific classification
- Kingdom: Animalia
- Phylum: Mollusca
- Class: Gastropoda
- Order: Nudibranchia
- Family: Goniodorididae
- Genus: Trapania
- Species: T. naeva

Binomial name
- Trapania naeva Gosliner & Fahey, 2008

= Trapania naeva =

Species of gastropod

Trapania naeva is a species of sea slug, a dorid nudibranch, a marine gastropod mollusc in the family Goniodorididae.

== Distribution ==
This species was described from Ryukyu, Japan. It is widespread in the Indo-Pacific region with records from the African coast (Tanzania, Kenya) through the Maldives, Indonesia and Western Australia to Fiji.

== Description ==
This goniodorid nudibranch is translucent white, with a pattern of large dark brown or black spots with smooth edges on the body. The gills, papillae, oral tentacles and rhinophores are dark brown or black.

== Ecology ==
Trapania naeva probably feeds on Entoprocta which often grow on sponges and other living substrata.
