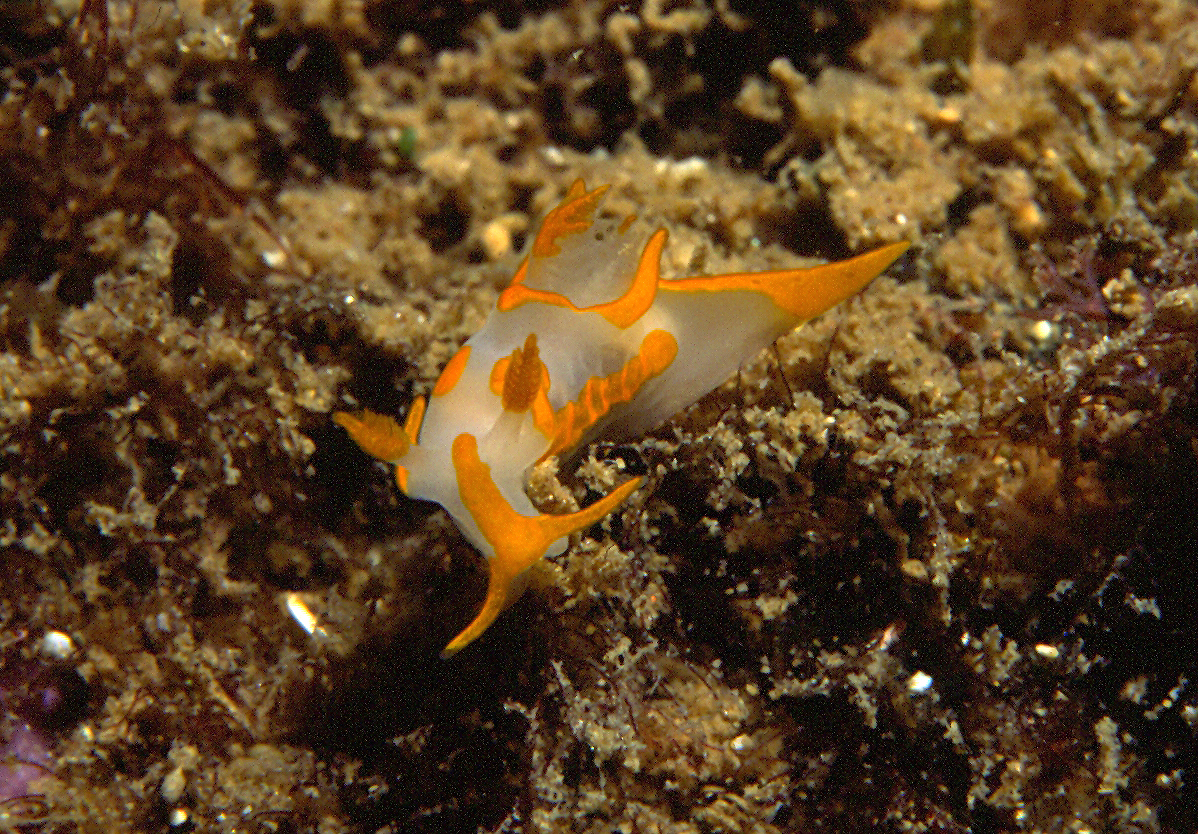
- A live individual of Trapania maculata, in situ, head towards the bottom of the image

Scientific classification
- Kingdom: Animalia
- Phylum: Mollusca
- Class: Gastropoda
- Order: Nudibranchia
- Family: Goniodorididae
- Subfamily: Anculinae
- Genus: Trapania; Pruvot-Fol, 1931

Synonyms
- Drepanida MacFarland, 1931

= Trapania =

Genus of gastropods

Trapania is a genus of sea slugs, specifically dorid nudibranchs, marine gastropod molluscs in the subfamily Anculinae in the family Goniodorididae.

== Description ==
The genus Trapania is distinguished from other goniodorid nudibranchs by the possession of two pairs of lateral papillae which arise from the remnant of the pallial margin and curve backwards parallel with the main body axis. One pair arises just outside the rhinophores and the other just outside the gill cluster. A pair of prominent oral tentacles are attached to the front of the head.

== Species ==
Species within the genus Trapania include:

- Trapania africana Edmunds, 2009
- Trapania armilla Gosliner & Fahey, 2008
- Trapania aurata Rudman, 1987
- Trapania aureopunctata Rudman, 1987
- Trapania bajamarensis Moro & Ortea, 2015
- Trapania benni Rudman, 1987
- Trapania bonellenae Valdés, 2009
- Trapania bourdili Lam & A. Valdés, 2026
- Trapania brunnea Rudman, 1987
- Trapania caerulea Gosliner & Fahey, 2008
- Trapania canaria Ortea & Moro, 2009
- Trapania circinata Gosliner & Fahey, 2008
- Trapania cirrita Gosliner & Fahey, 2008
- Trapania dalva Ev. Marcus, 1972
- Trapania darvelli Rudman, 1987
- Trapania darwini Gosliner & Fahey, 2008
- Trapania euryeia Gosliner & Fahey, 2008
- Trapania franae Paz-Sedano, Cobb, Gosliner & Pola, 2024
- Trapania fusca (Lafont, 1874) - type species, originally described as Drepania fusca Lafont, 1874
- Trapania gibbera Gosliner & Fahey, 2008
- Trapania goddardi Hermosillo & Valdés, 2004
- Trapania goslineri Millen & Bertsch, 2000
- Trapania graeffei (Bergh, 1881) - possibly a synonym of Trapania fusca
- Trapania huarmeyana R. Uribe, Mendivil, Pastor, Atoche-Suclupe, Aleman, Flores & F. Sepúlveda, 2025
- Trapania inbiotica Camacho-Garcia & Ortea, 2000
- Trapania japonica (Baba, 1935)
- Trapania joannotae Lam & A. Valdés, 2026
- Trapania kahel Smirnoff, Donohoo & Gosliner, 2022
- Trapania kamagong Smirnoff, Donohoo & Gosliner, 2022
- Trapania kanaloa Smirnoff, Donohoo & Gosliner, 2022
- Trapania lemnalioides Smirnoff, Donohoo & Gosliner, 2022
- Trapania lineata Haefelfinger, 1960
- Trapania luquei Ortea, 1989
- Trapania maculata Haefelfinger, 1960
- Trapania maringa Er. Marcus, 1957
- Trapania mechineaui Lam & A. Valdés, 2026
- Trapania melaina Gosliner & Fahey, 2008
- Trapania miltabrancha Gosliner & Fahey, 2008
- Trapania naeva Gosliner & Fahey, 2008
- Trapania nebula Gosliner & Fahey, 2008
- Trapania orteai Garcia-Gomez & Cervera in Cervera & Garcia-Gomez, 1989
- Trapania palmula Gosliner & Fahey, 2008
- Trapania reticulata Rudman, 1987
- Trapania rocheae Cetra & Roche, 2019
- Trapania rocherensis Lam & A. Valdés, 2026
- Trapania rollandi Lam & A. Valdés, 2026
- Trapania rudmani M. C. Miller, 1981
- Trapania safracornia Fahey, 2004
- Trapania sanctipetrensis Cervera, Garcia-Gomez & Megina, 2000
- Trapania scurra Gosliner & Fahey, 2008
- Trapania squama Gosliner & Fahey, 2008
- Trapania stegodon Smirnoff, Donohoo & Gosliner, 2022
- Trapania tamaraw Smirnoff, Donohoo & Gosliner, 2022
- Trapania tartanella (H. von Ihering, 1886)
- Trapania tigger Smirnoff, Donohoo & Gosliner, 2022
- Trapania toddi Rudman, 1987
- Trapania tora Gosliner & Fahey, 2008
- Trapania undulata Smirnoff, Donohoo & Gosliner, 2022
- Trapania velox (Cockerell, 1901)
- Trapania vitta Gosliner & Fahey, 2008

Species brought into synonymy include:

- Trapania hispalensis Cervera & García-Gómez, 1989: synonym of Trapania lineata Haefelfinger, 1960
- Trapania pallida Kress, 1968: synonym of Trapania lineata Haefelfinger, 1960
- Trapania rochei Cetra & Roche, 2019: synonym of Trapania rocheae Cetra & Roche, 2019 (wrong gender agreement of specific epithet)

== Gallery ==
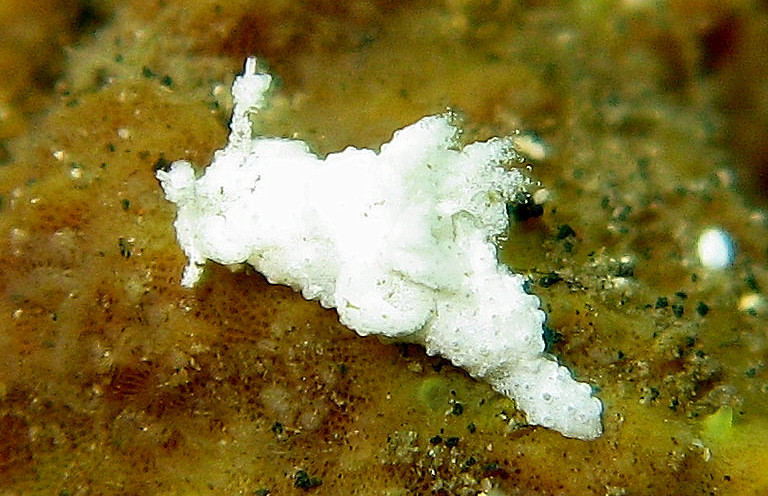
Trapania armilla

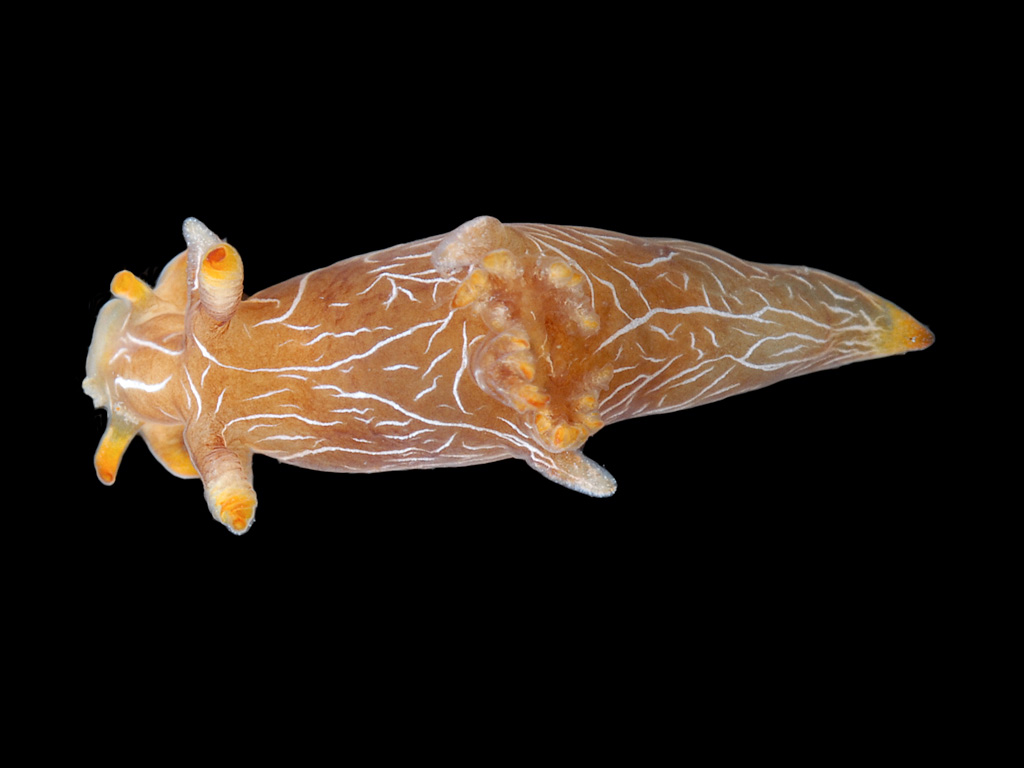
Trapania cirrita

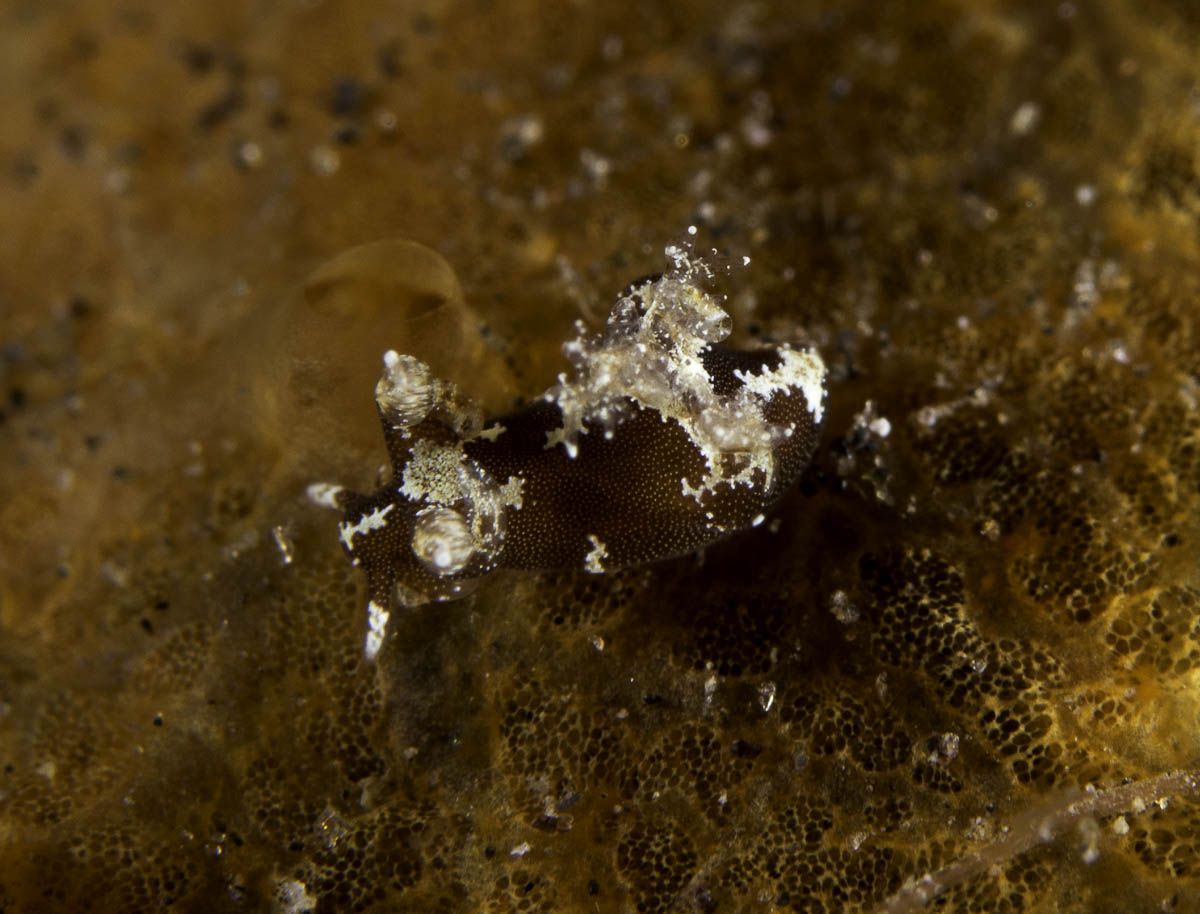
Trapania euryeia

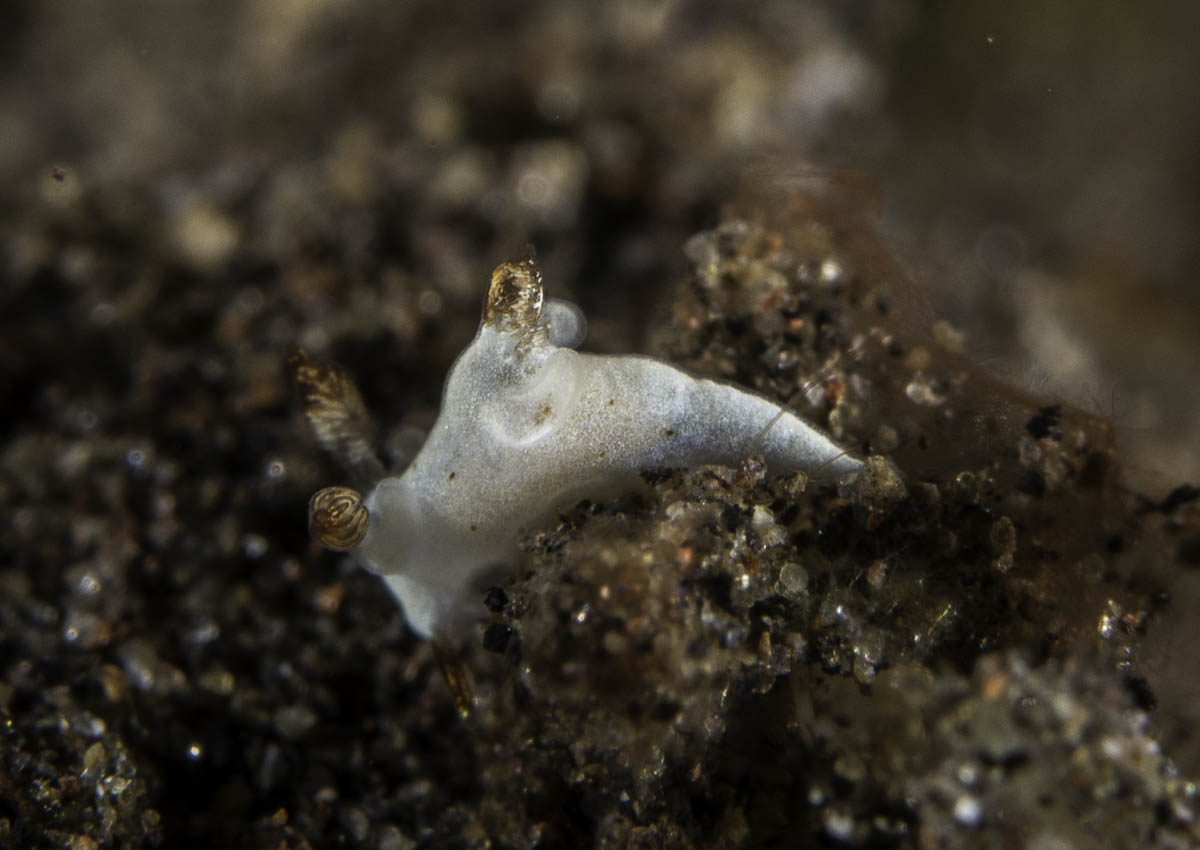
Trapania gibbera

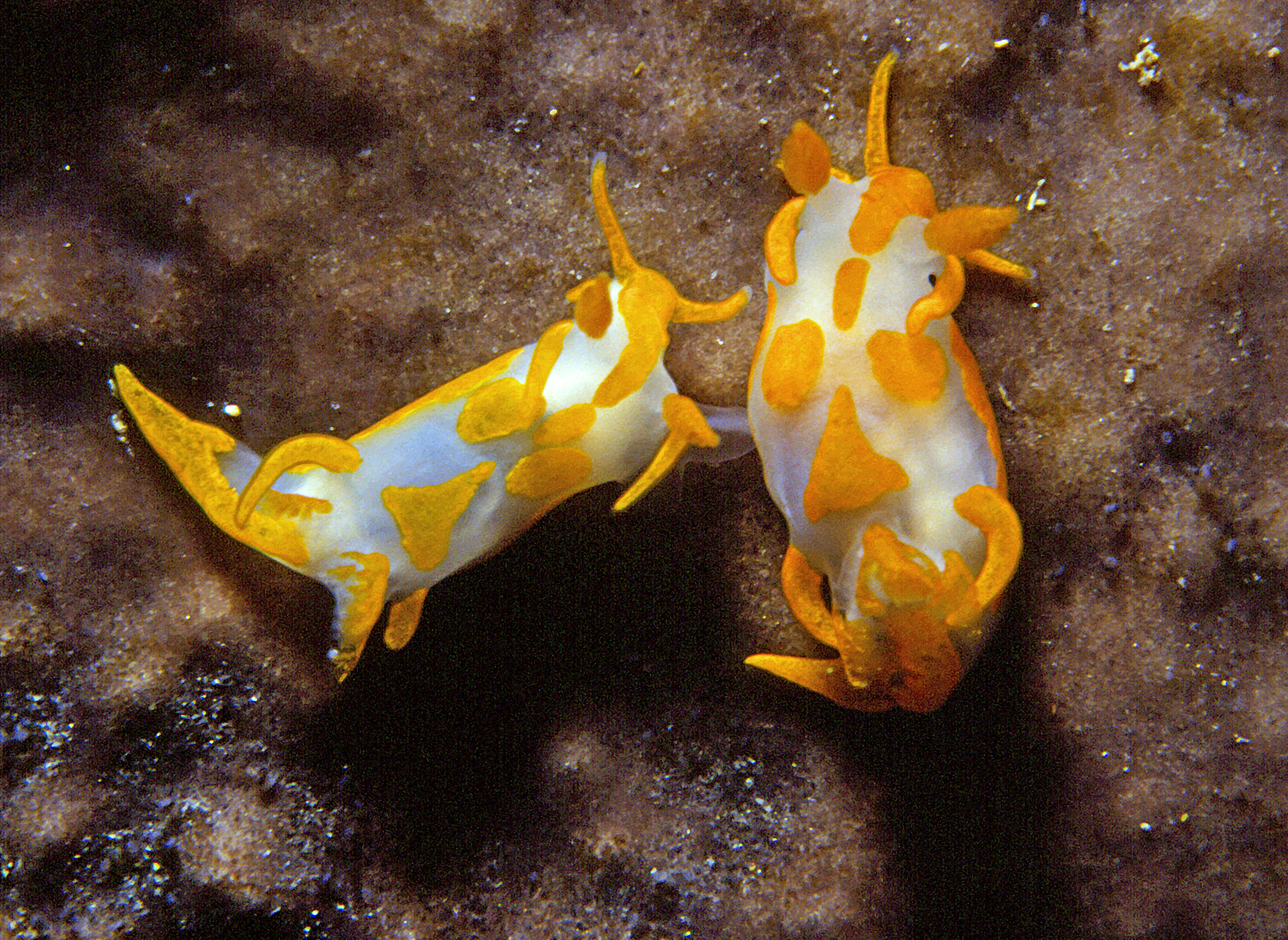
Trapania maculata

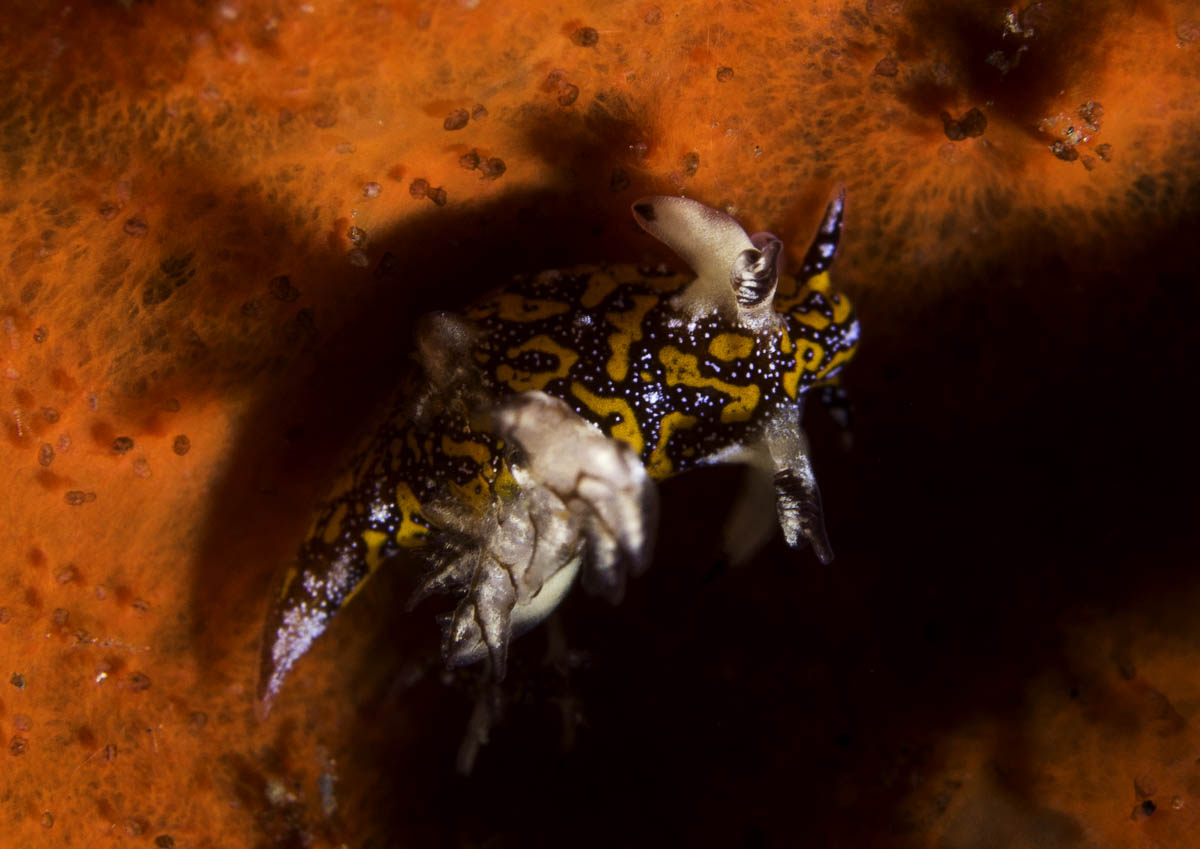
Trapania miltabrancha

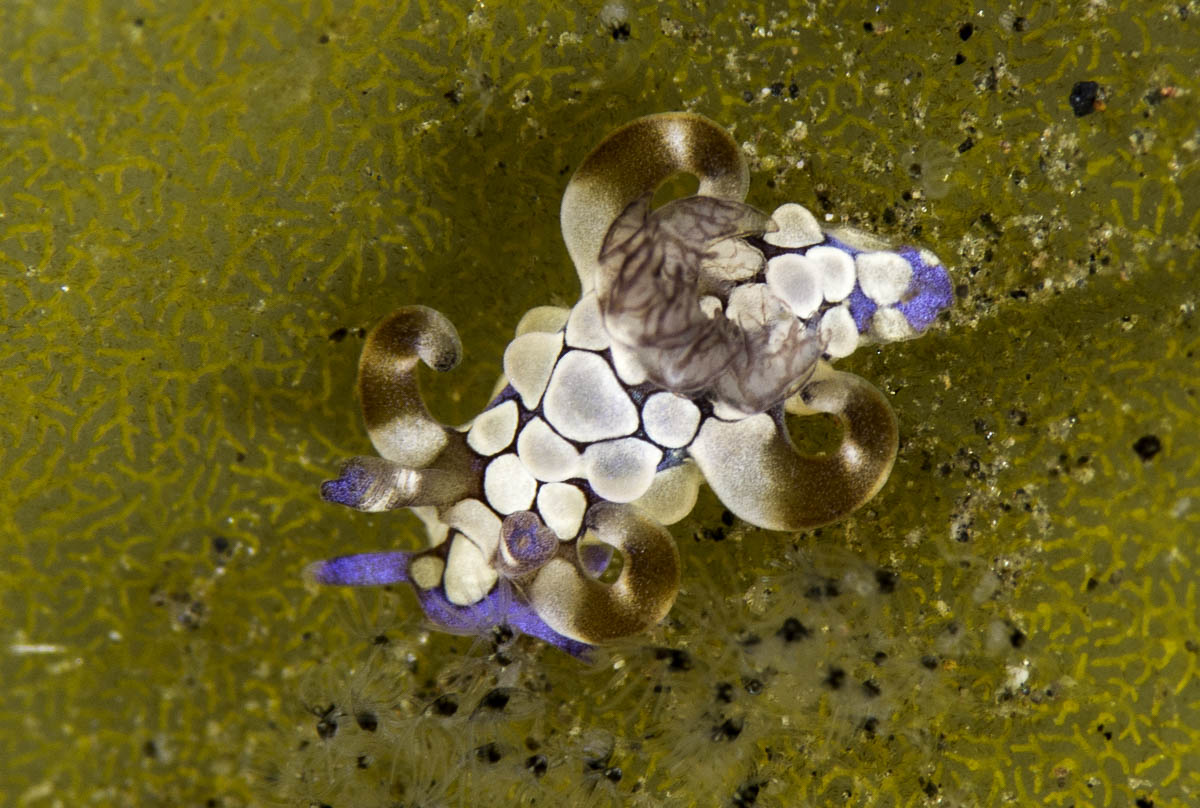
Trapania scurra

Trapania tigger

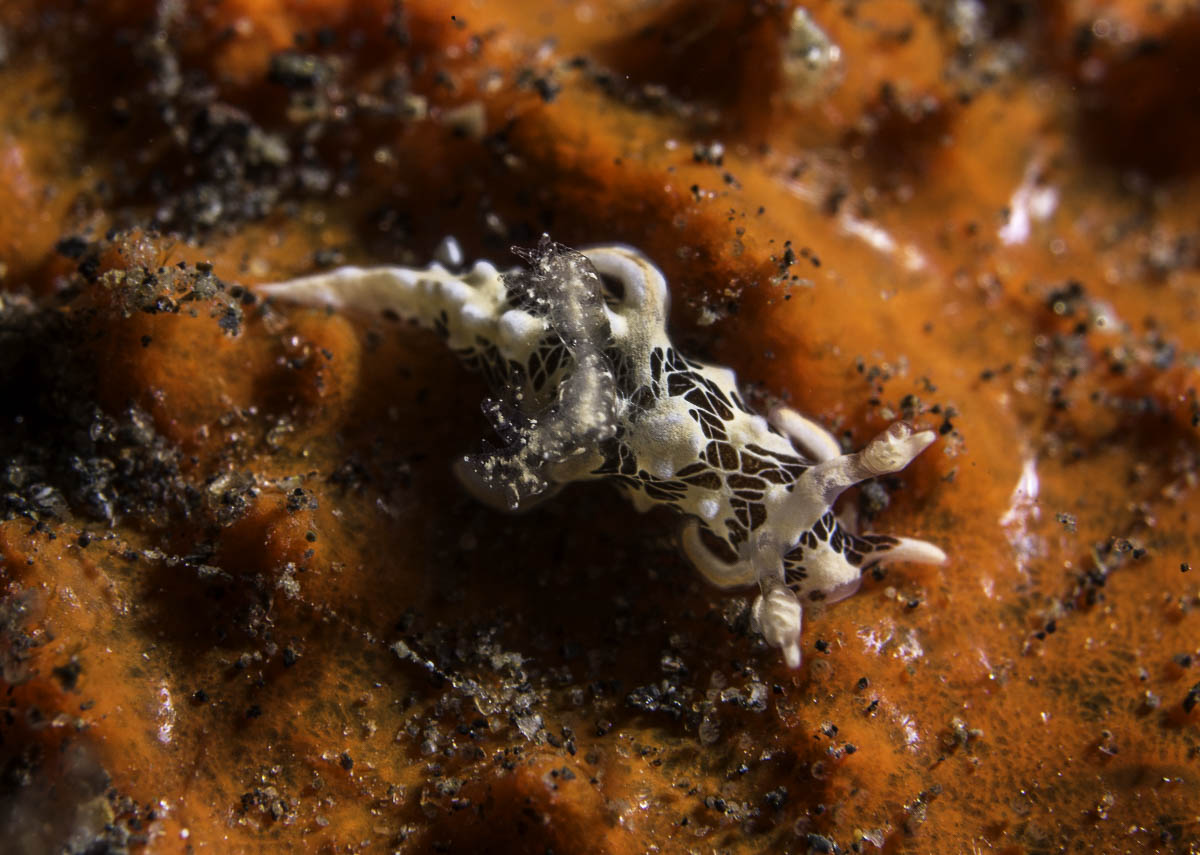
Trapania tora
