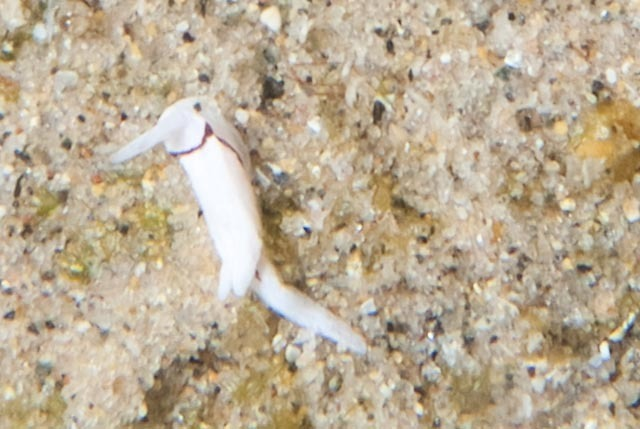
- Murphydoris cobbi

Scientific classification
- Kingdom: Animalia
- Phylum: Mollusca
- Class: Gastropoda
- Order: Nudibranchia
- Family: Goniodorididae
- Genus: Murphydoris; Sigurdsson, 1991

Type species
- Murphydoris singaporensis Sigurdsson, 1991

= Murphydoris =

Genus of gastropods

Murphydoris is a genus of sea slugs, specifically dorid nudibranchs, marine gastropod molluscs in the subfamily Goniodoridinae in the family Goniodorididae.

== Genus description ==
The generic name Murphydoris was created to honor the zoologist and ecologist D. H. Murphy, who is on the staff at the National University of Singapore.

The genus Murphydoris lacks peri-anal ctenidia (comb-like respiratory gills); its rhinophores are non-lamellate and its radula formula is n x 1.1.0.1.1. The lateral teeth are unicuspid (= with a single tapering point) with 12 denticles and the marginal teeth are bicuspid.

== Species ==
- Murphydoris adusta Paz-Sedano, Smirnoff, Candás, Gosliner & Pola, 2022
- Murphydoris cobbi Paz-Sedano, Smirnoff, Candás, Gosliner & Pola, 2022
- Murphydoris maracabranchia Paz-Sedano, Smirnoff, Candás, Gosliner & Pola, 2022
- Murphydoris polkadotsa Paz-Sedano, Cobb, Gosliner & Pola, 2024
- Murphydoris puncticulata Paz-Sedano, Smirnoff, Candás, Gosliner & Pola, 2022
- Murphydoris singaporensis Sigurdsson, 1991
M. adusta

M. adusta

M. adusta

M. cobbi
