= Trapania luquei =

Scientific classification
- Kingdom: Animalia
- Phylum: Mollusca
- Class: Gastropoda
- Order: Nudibranchia
- Family: Goniodorididae
- Genus: Trapania
- Species: T. luquei

Binomial name
- Trapania luquei Ortea, 1989

Species of gastropod

Trapania luquei is a species of sea slug, a dorid nudibranch, a marine gastropod mollusc in the family Goniodorididae.

== Description ==
The length of the body attains 12 mm. Its dorsum and tail are white, peppered with small, intense yellow spots in an irregular pattern, while the flanks are dark or nearly black with small unpigmented areas.

== Distribution ==
This species was first described from the Cape Verde Islands.

== Ecology ==
Trapania luquei probably feeds on Entoprocta which often grow on sponges and other living substrata.
