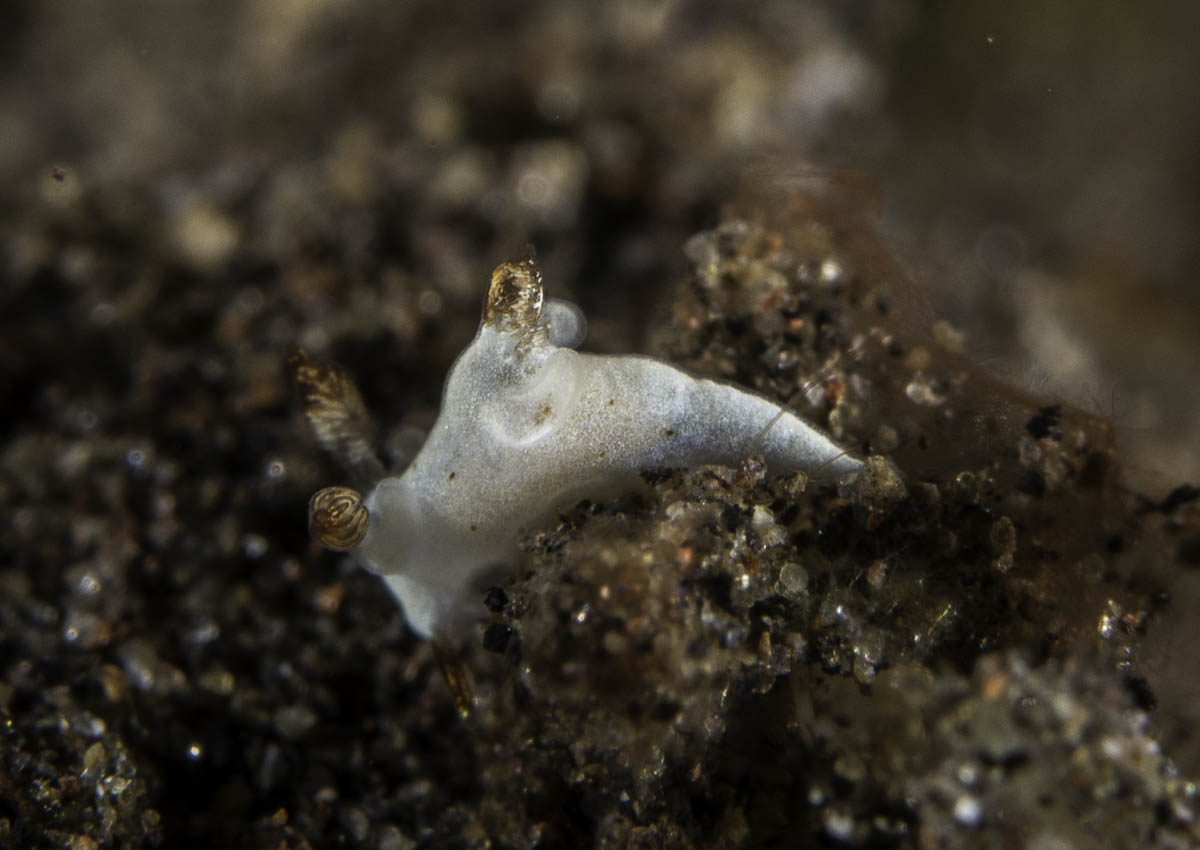
- The nudibranch Trapania gibbera, Tulamben, Bali, Indonesia

Scientific classification
- Kingdom: Animalia
- Phylum: Mollusca
- Class: Gastropoda
- Order: Nudibranchia
- Family: Goniodorididae
- Genus: Trapania
- Species: T. gibbera

Binomial name
- Trapania gibbera Gosliner & Fahey, 2008

= Trapania gibbera =

Species of gastropod

Trapania gibbera is a species of sea slug, a dorid nudibranch, a marine gastropod mollusc in the family Goniodorididae.

== Distribution ==
This species was first described from Nivani Island, Louisiade Archipelago, Papua New Guinea. The original description also includes specimens from Bali and Okinawa. A specimen from Lizard Island, Queensland is probably this species.

== Description ==
This goniodorid nudibranch is opaque white in colour. The oral tentacles are translucent orange and the rhinophores and gills are edged with the same colour. There is a dark brown bar across the front of the head between the oral tentacles.

== Ecology ==
Trapania gibbera probably feeds on Entoprocta which often grow on sponges and other living substrata.
