= Bill Rudman =

New Zealand-Australian malacologist

William B. "Bill" Rudman (born 1944) is a malacologist from New Zealand and Australia. In particular he studies sea slugs, opisthobranch gastropod molluscs, and has named many species of nudibranchs.

Rudman has a PhD from the University of Auckland, gained with a thesis on bullomorph opisthobranchs. Rudman ran the Sea Slug Forum, a website affiliated with the Australian Museum. In Rudman's words, the forum "aims to generate more interest in these fascinating animals by sharing information with a worldwide audience." Sea Slug Forum has information and numerous images of nudibranchs, bubble-snails, sea hares and other kinds of sea slugs. It was discontinued in 2010 after 14,523 messages had been posted. It is still online as a resource, but not accepting new messages.

== Taxa ==
Species named in honour of this malacologist include:

- Aplysia rudmani Bebbington, 1974
- Cadulus rudmani Lamprell & Healy, 1998
- Hypselodoris rudmani Gosliner & R. F. Johnson, 1999
- Phyllidiella rudmani Brunckhorst, 1993
- Phyllodesmium rudmani Burghardt & Gosliner, 2006
- Trapania rudmani M. C. Miller, 1981

The World Register of Marine Species (WoRMS) lists 186 marine species named by Rudman.

== Bibliography ==
Rudman's bibliography includes:

- Rudman, W. B. 1968 "Three new species of the opisthobranch family Aglajidae from New Zealand." Transactions of the Royal Society of New Zealand, Zoology 10(23): 211–216.
- Rudman, W. B. (1970). "A Revision of the Genus Philine in New Zealand with Descriptions of Two New Species (Gastropoda Opisthobranchia)". Journal of the Malacological Society of Australia. 2: 23–34. doi:10.1080/00852988.1970.10673837.
- Rudman, W. B. (1971). "On a New Genus for "Tornatina" Murdoch! Suter, 1913 (Retusidae, Opisthobranchia)". Journal of the Malacological Society of Australia. 2 (2): 187–193. doi:10.1080/00852988.1971.10673851.
- Rudman, W. B. (1971). "The Family Acteonidae (Opisthobranchia, Gastropoda) in New Zealand". Journal of the Malacological Society of Australia. 2 (2): 205–214. doi:10.1080/00852988.1971.10673853.
- Rudman, W. B. (1971). "The Genus Bullina (Opisthobranchia, Gastropoda) in New Zealand". Journal of the Malacological Society of Australia. 2 (2): 195–203. doi:10.1080/00852988.1971.10673852.
- Rudman, W. B. (1980). "Aeolid opisthobranch molluscs (Glaucidae) from the Indian Ocean and the south-west Pacific". Zoological Journal of the Linnean Society. 68 (2): 139–172. doi:10.1111/j.1096-3642.1980.tb01923.x.
- Rudman, W. B. (1982). "The Chromodorididae (Opisthobranchia: Mollusca) of the Indo-West Pacific: Chromodoris quadricolor, C. Lineolata and Hypselodoris nigrolineata colour groups". Zoological Journal of the Linnean Society. 76 (3): 183–241. doi:10.1111/j.1096-3642.1982.tb02182.x.
- Rudman, W. B. (1982). "The taxonomy and biology of further aeolidacean and arminacean nudibranch molluscs with symbiotic zooxanthellae". Zoological Journal of the Linnean Society. 74 (2): 147–196. doi:10.1111/j.1096-3642.1982.tb01146.x.
- Rudman, W. B. (1984). "The Chromodorididae (Opisthobranchia: Mollusca) of the Indo-West Pacific: A review of the genera". Zoological Journal of the Linnean Society. 81 (2–3): 115–273. doi:10.1111/j.1096-3642.1984.tb01174.x.
- Rudman, W. B. (1985). "The Chromodorididae (Opisthobranchia: Mollusca) of the Indo-West Pacific: Chromodoris aureomarginata, C. Verrieri and C. Fidelis colour groups". Zoological Journal of the Linnean Society. 83 (3): 241–299. doi:10.1111/j.1096-3642.1985.tb00875.x.
- Rudman, W.B. (1987). "The Genus Trapania (Nudibranchia: Goniodorididae) in the Indo-West Pacific". Journal of Molluscan Studies. 53 (2): 189–212. doi:10.1093/mollus/53.2.189.
- Rudman, W. B. (1988). "The Chromodorididae (Opisthobranchia: Mollusca) of the Indo-West Pacific: The genus Ceratosoma J. E. Gray". Zoological Journal of the Linnean Society. 93 (2): 133–185. doi:10.1111/j.1096-3642.1988.tb01531.x.
- Rudman, W. B. (1990). "The Chromodorididae (Opisthobranchia: Mollusca) of the Indo-West Pacific: Further species of Glossodoris, Thorunna and the Chromodoris aureomarginata colour group". Zoological Journal of the Linnean Society. 100 (3): 263–326. doi:10.1111/j.1096-3642.1990.tb01864.x.
- Rudman, W.B. (1995). "The Chromodorididae (Opisthobranchia: Mollusca) of the Indo-West Pacific: Further species from New Caledonia and the Noumea romeri colour group". Molluscan Research. 16: 1–43. doi:10.1080/13235818.1995.10673663.
- Rudman, W. B. (2004). "Further species of the opisthobranch genus Okenia (Nudibranchia: Goniodorididae) from the Indo-West Pacific". Zootaxa. 695: 1. doi:10.11646/zootaxa.695.1.1. S2CID 89226554.
- Rudman, William B. (2007). "Two new species of Okenia (Gastropoda: Nudibranchia: Goniodorididae) from eastern Australia and Tanzania". Zootaxa. 1657: 57–67. doi:10.11646/zootaxa.1657.1.4. S2CID 92483221.
- Gordon, D. P.; Rudman, W. B. (2006). "Integripelta acanthus n. sp. (Bryozoa: Eurystomellidae) — a tropical prey species of Okenia hiroi (Nudibranchia)". Zootaxa. 1229: 41. doi:10.11646/zootaxa.1229.1.3. S2CID 86265256.

== See also ==
- Category:Taxa named by William B. Rudman
