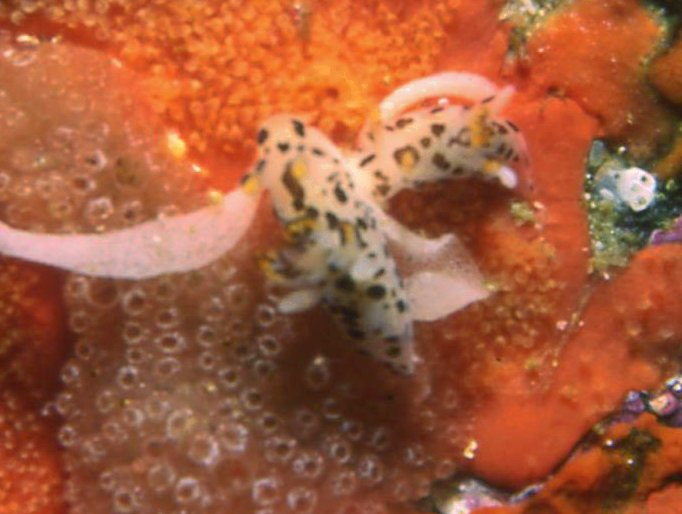
- Two giraffe spot nudibranchs, Ancula sp., with their egg ribbon

Scientific classification
- Kingdom: Animalia
- Phylum: Mollusca
- Class: Gastropoda
- Order: Nudibranchia
- Superfamily: Onchidoridoidea
- Family: Goniodorididae; H. Adams & A. Adams, 1854

Synonyms
- Hopkinsiinae Odhner, 1968; Okeniidae Iredale & O'Donoghue, 1923

= Goniodorididae =

Family of gastropods

Goniodorididae is a taxonomic family of sea slugs, specifically dorid nudibranchs, marine gastropod molluscs in the superfamily Onchidoridoidea.

== Taxonomy ==
There are two subfamilies within Goniodorididae, with associated genera:

- Anculinae
  - Ancula Lovén, 1846
  - Trapania Pruvot-Fol, 1931
- Goniodoridinae
  - Bermudella Odhner, 1941
  - Cargoa Vogel & L. P. Schultz, 1970
  - Ceratodoris J. E. Gray, 1850
  - Goniodoridella Pruvot-Fol, 1933
  - Lophodoris G. O. Sars, 1878
  - Murphydoris Sigurdsson, 1991
  - Naisdoris Paz-Sedano, Moles, Smirnoff, Gosliner & Pola, 2024
  - Okenia Menke, 1830
  - Pelagella J. E. Gray, 1850
  - Spahria Risbec, 1928
