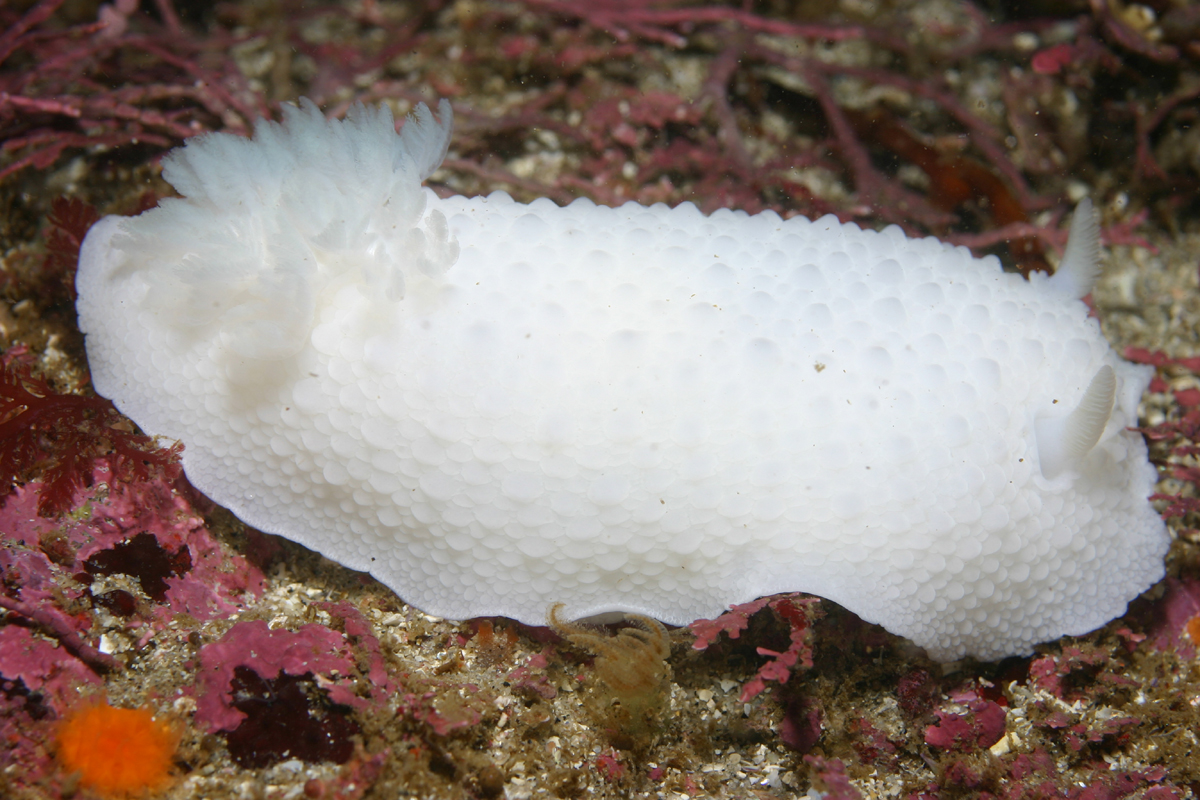
- Doris odhneri

Scientific classification
- Kingdom: Animalia
- Phylum: Mollusca
- Class: Gastropoda
- Order: Nudibranchia
- Infraorder: Doridoidei
- Superfamily: Doridoidea; Rafinesque, 1815

Families
- See text.

Synonyms
- Cryptobranchia; Eudoridoidea; Labiostomata

= Doridoidea =

Superfamily of gastropods

Doridoidea, commonly known as dorid nudibranchs (and previously known as the taxon Cryptobranchia), are a taxonomic superfamily of medium to large, shell-less sea slugs, marine gastropod mollusks in the clade Doridacea, included in the clade Nudibranchia.

== Etymology ==
The word "Doridoidea" comes from the generic name Doris, which was in turn copied from the name of the sea nymph, Doris, in Greek mythology.

== Families ==
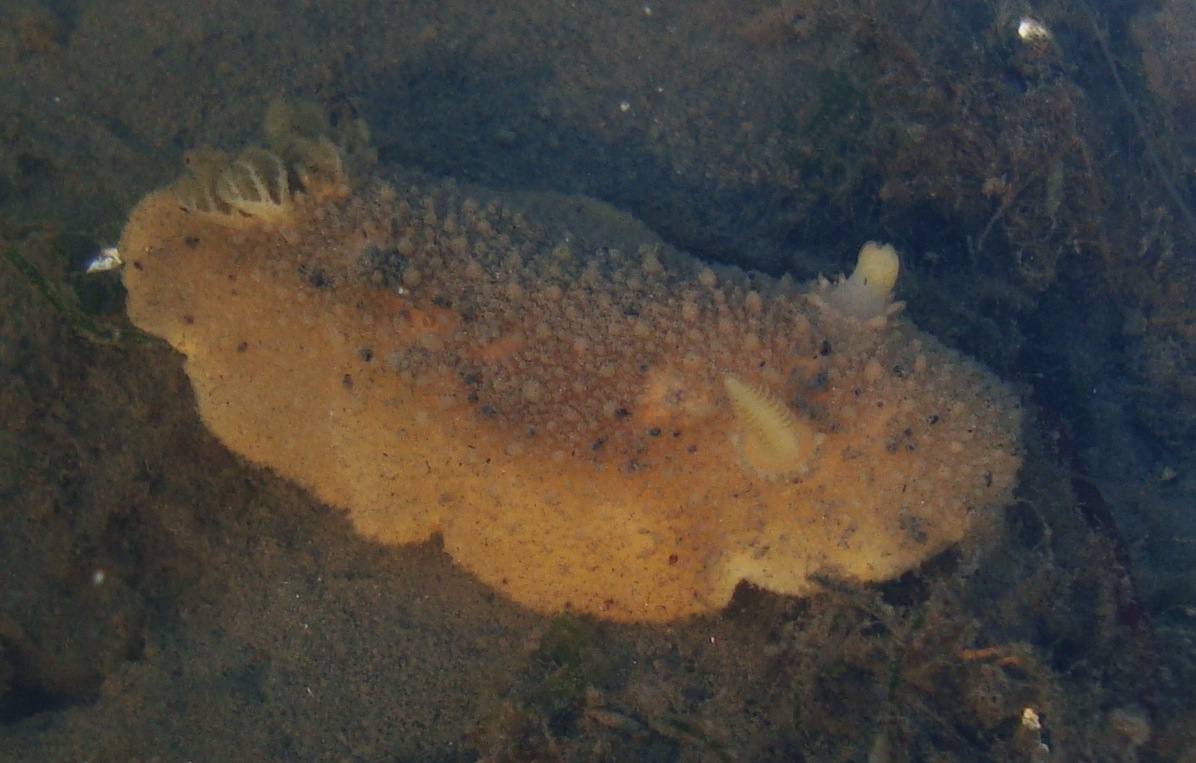
Peltodoris nobilis from Yaquina Bay

According to the Taxonomy of the Gastropoda (Bouchet & Rocroi, 2005), families within the superfamily Doridoidea include:

- Actinocyclidae O'Donoghue, 1929
- Chromodorididae Bergh, 1891
- Discodorididae Bergh, 1891
- Dorididae Rafinesque, 1815

=== Changes later than 2005 ===
The family Cadlinidae Bergh, 1891 was considered a synonym of the Chromodorididae. Research by R.F. Johnson in 2011 has shown that Cadlina does not belong to the family Chromodorididae. She has therefore brought back the name Cadlinidae from synonymy with Chromodorididae. The chromodorid nudibranchs without Cadlina are now monophyletic and turn out to be a possible sister to the Actinocyclidae

=== Currently recognized families ===
- Actinocyclidae O'Donoghue, 1929
- Cadlinidae Bergh, 1891
- Chromodorididae Bergh, 1891
- Discodorididae Bergh, 1891
- Dorididae Rafinesque, 1815
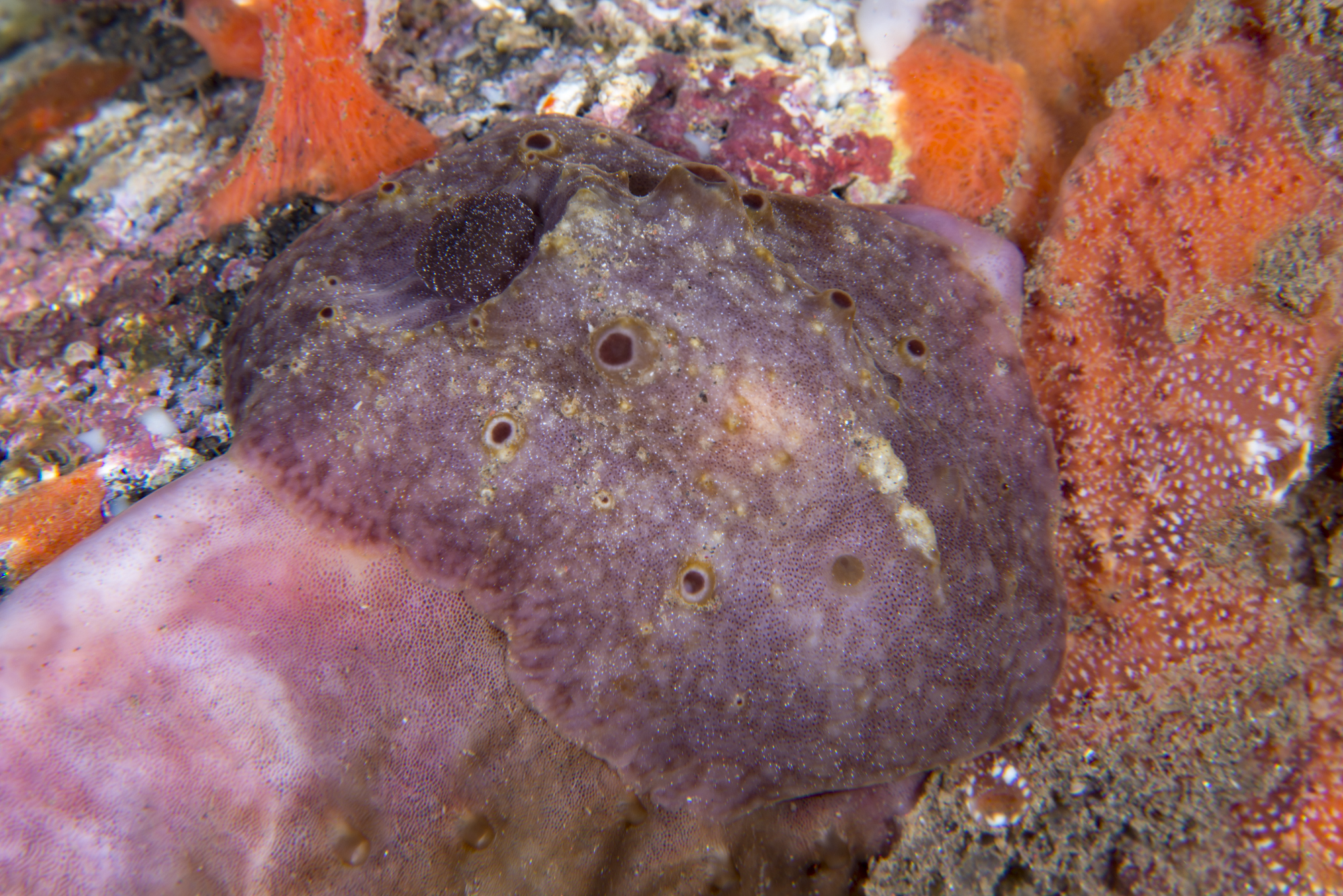
Actinocyclus verrucosus of Actinocyclidae

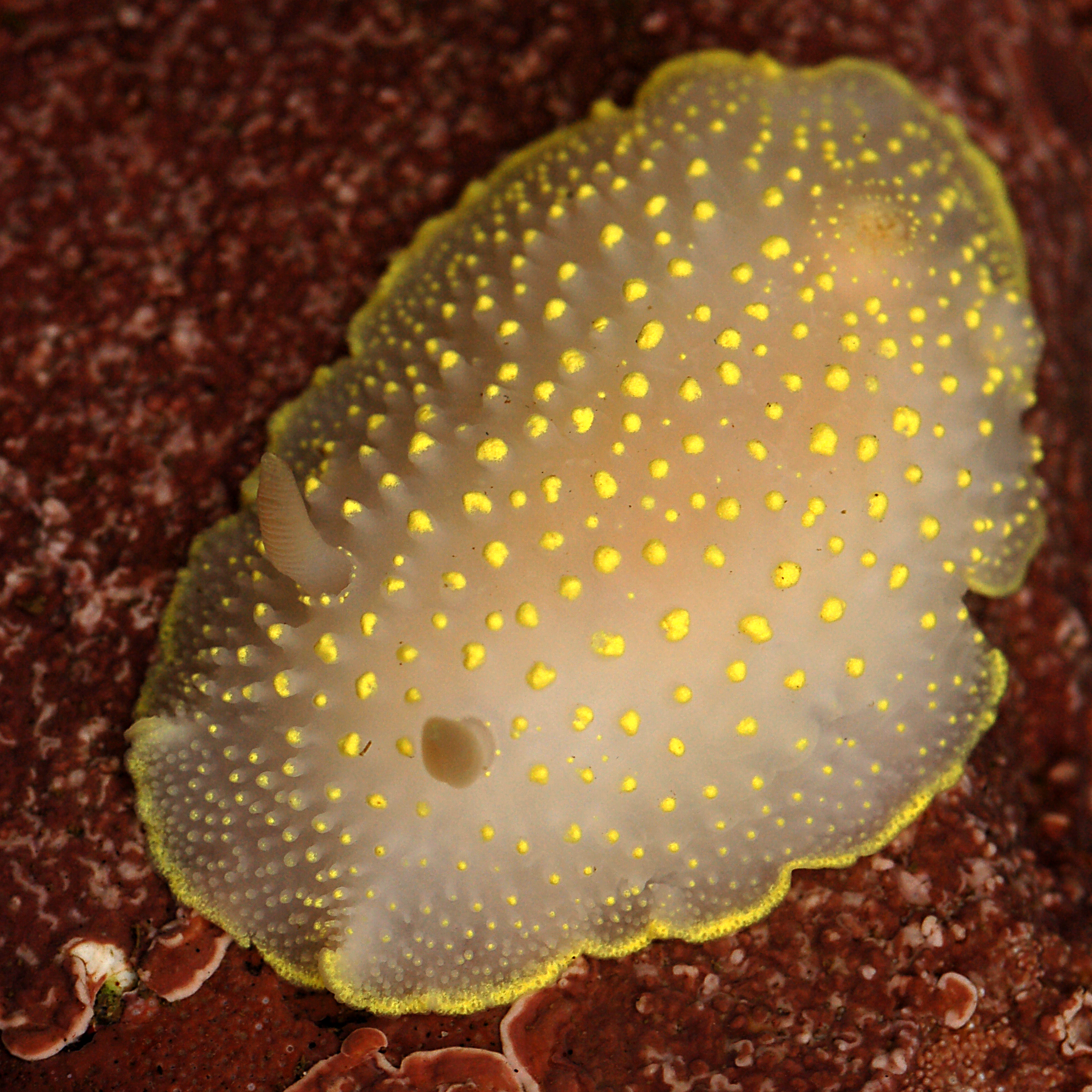
Cadlina luteomarginata of Cadlinidae

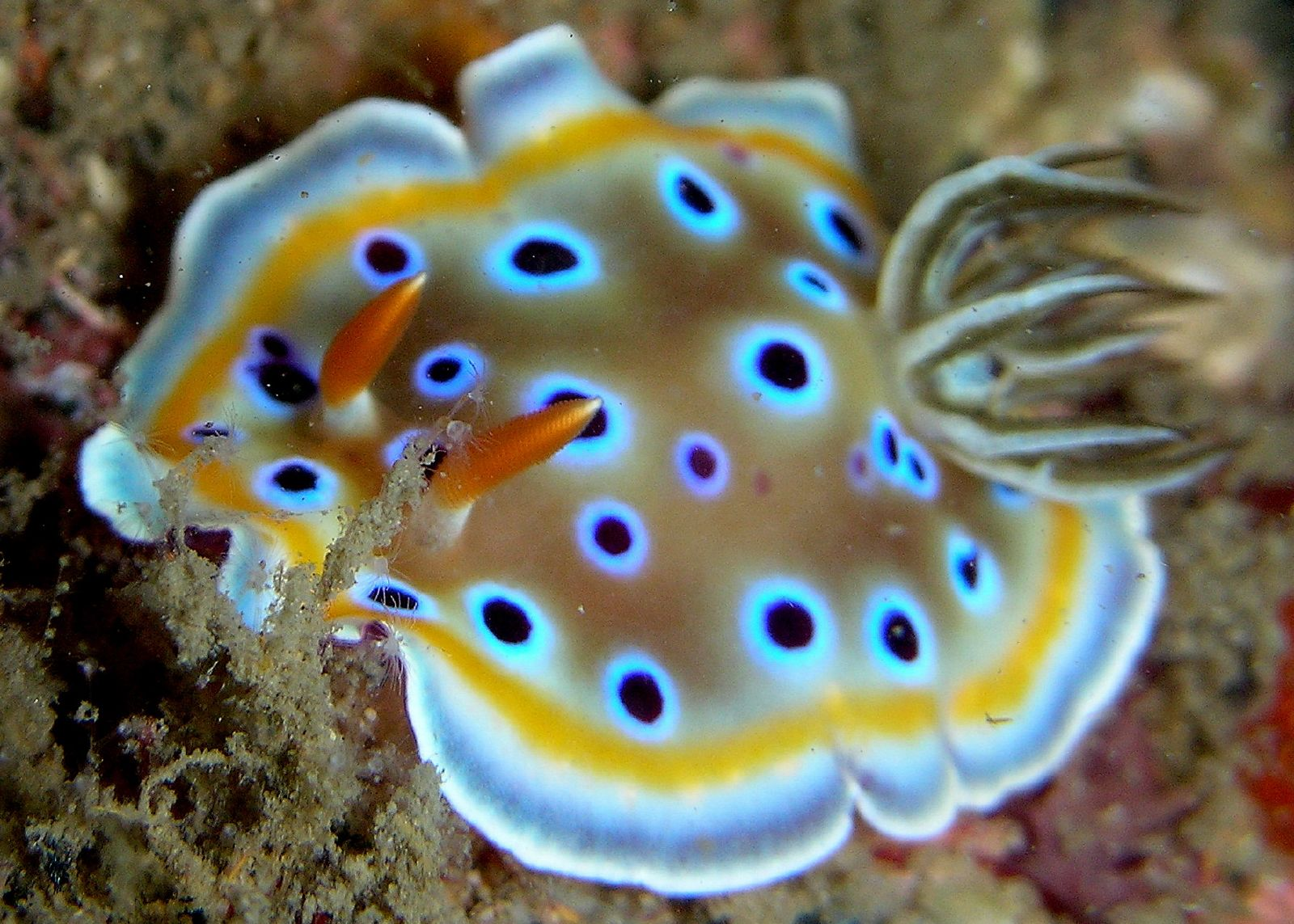
Goniobranchus geminus of Chromodorididae

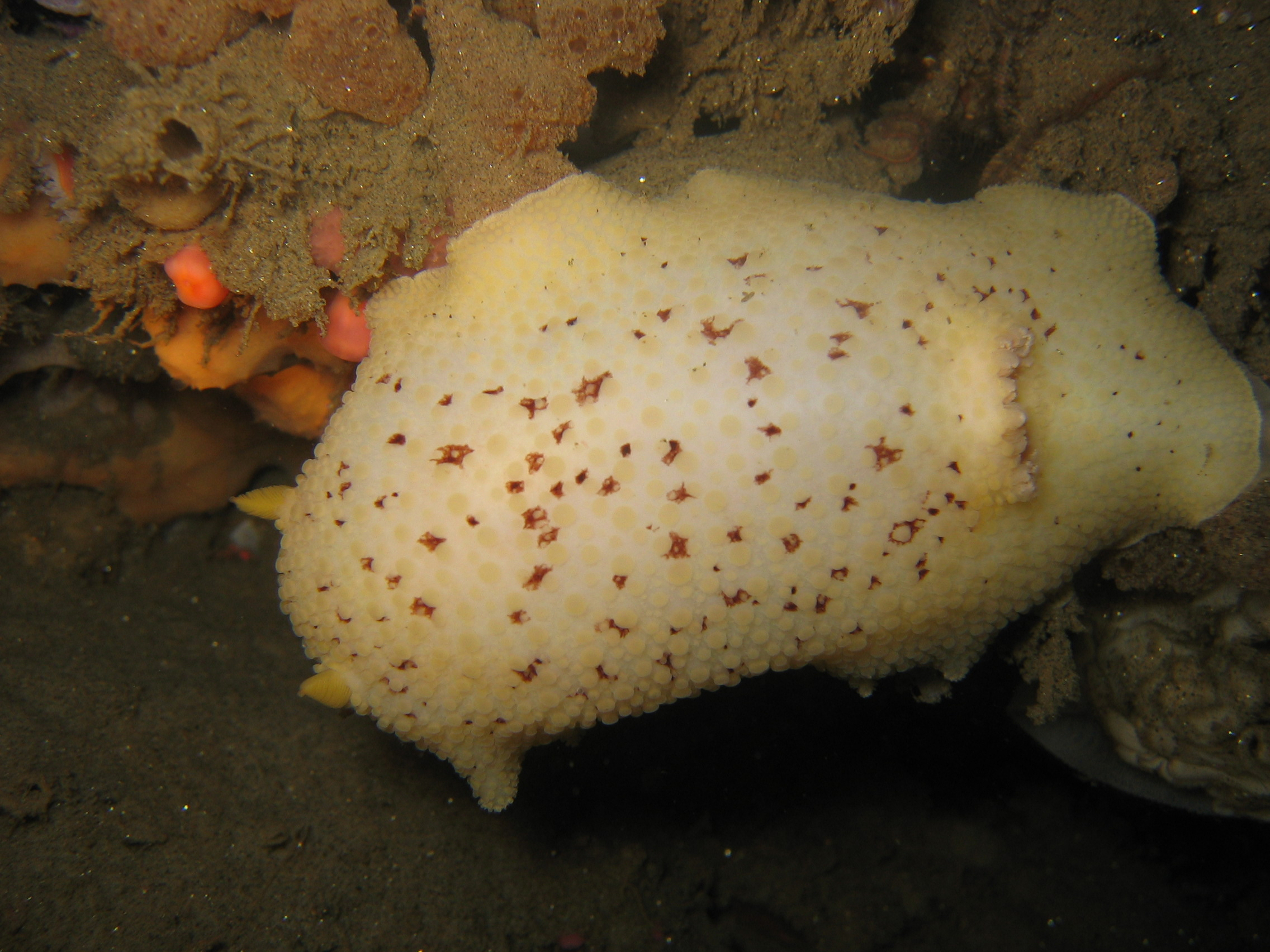
Diaulula nobilis of Discodorididae

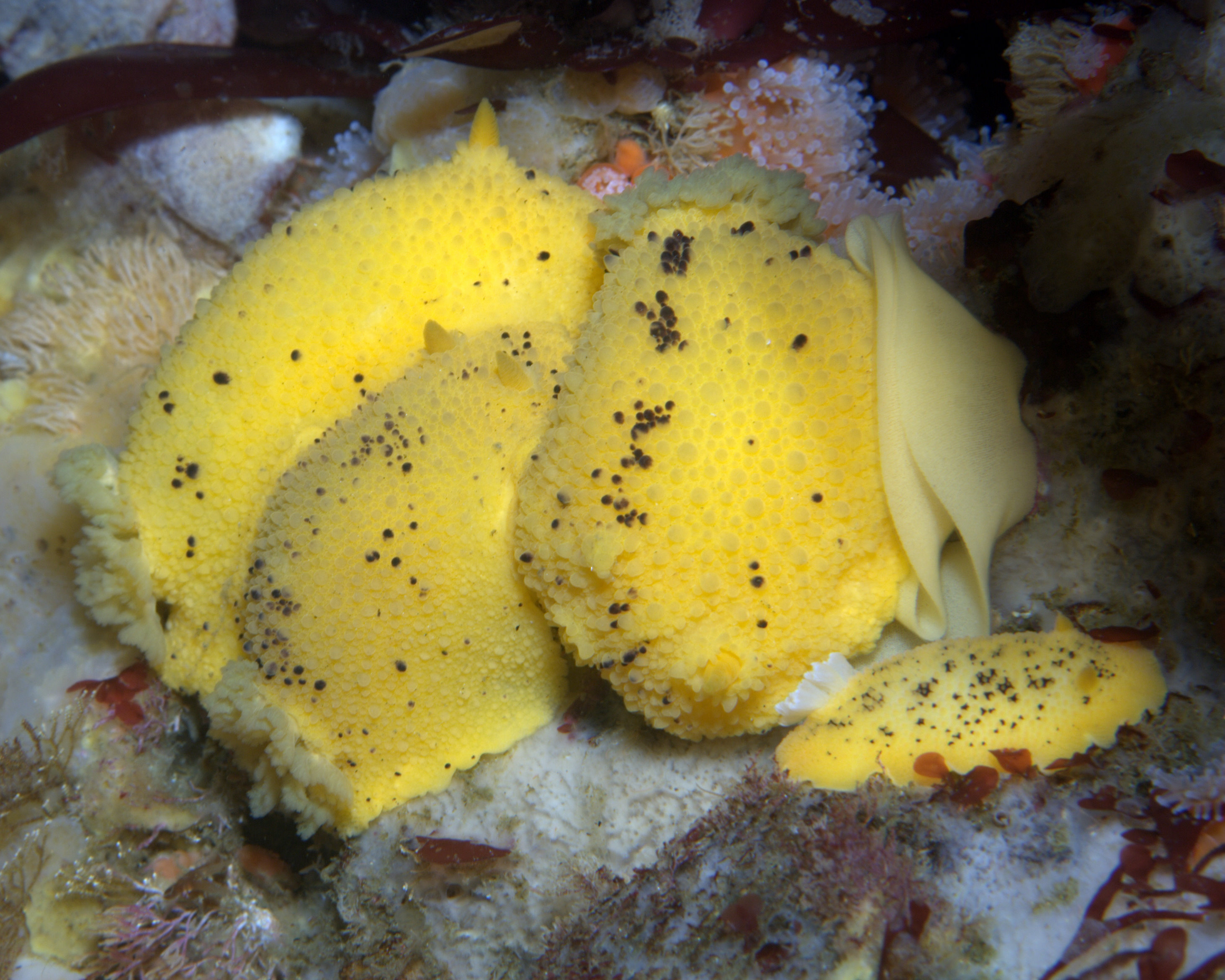
Doris montereyensis of Dorididae

== Synonyms ==
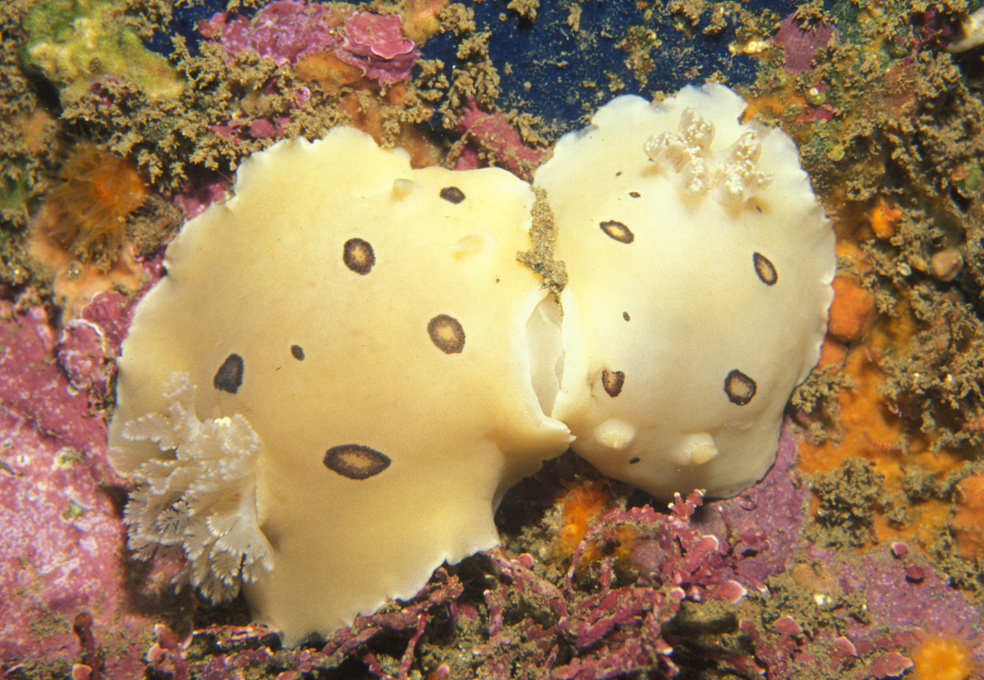
Mating pair of cryptobranchs (Diaulula sandiegensis)

The next families are considered synonyms. But these names can still be found in many publications and on the internet.

- Aldisidae Odhner, 1939 - synonym of Cadlinidae
- Archidorididae Bergh, 1891 - synonym of Dorididae
- Asteronotidae Thiele, 1931 - synonym of Discodorididae
- Baptodorididae Odhner, 1926 - synonym of Discodorididae
- Conualeviidae Collier & Farmer, 1964 - synonym of Dorididae
- Geitodorididae Odhner, 1968 - synonym of Discodorididae
- Halgerdidae Odhner, 1926 - synonym of Discodorididae
- Homoiodorididae Bergh, 1882 -synonym of Dorididae and Dendrodorididae
- Kentrodorididae Bergh, 1891 - synonym of Discodorididae
- Platydorididae Bergh, 1891 - synonym of Discodorididae
- Rostangidae Pruvot-Fol, 1951 - synonym of Discodorididae

=== Cryptobranch dorid nudibranchs ===
Cryptobranch dorid nudibranchs (previously known as the taxon Cryptobranchia), are nudibranch sea slugs within the clade Doridacea. These slugs are called "cryptobranch," meaning "hidden gill", because they are able to retract their gills into a gill pocket, in contrast to nudibranchs in the traditional group phanerobranchs (or Phanerobranchia), which taxon is probably paraphyletic (in other words, composed of more than one evolutionary lineage).

A. Valdés distinguishes two major clades within the Cryptobranchia: the dorids that have no radula (the Porostomata); and those with a radula (the Labiostomata). The Labiostomata include the monophyletic families: Actinocyclidae, Chromodorididae, Dorididae and Discodorididae.

The cryptobranchs include the following genera that are regarded as valid:

- Doris Linnaeus, 1758
- Asteronotus Ehrenberg, 1831
- Atagema J. E. Gray, 1850
- Jorunna Bergh, 1876
- Discodoris Bergh, 1877
- Platydoris Bergh, 1877
- Thordisa Bergh, 1877
- Diaulula Bergh, 1878
- Aldisa Bergh, 1878
- Rostanga Bergh, 1879*
- Aphelodoris Bergh, 1879
- Halgerda Bergh, 1880
- Peltodoris Bergh, 1880
- Hoplodoris Bergh, 1880
- Paradoris Bergh, 1884
- Baptodoris Bergh, 1884
- Geitodoris Bergh, 1891
- Gargamella Bergh, 1894
- Alloiodoris Bergh, 1904
- Sclerodoris Eliot, 1904
- Otinodoris White, 1948
- Taringa Er. Marcus, 1955
- Sebadoris Er. Marcus & Ev. Marcus, 1960
- Conualevia Collier & Farmer, 1964
- Thorybopus Bouchet, 1977
- Goslineria Valdés, 2001
- Pharodoris Valdés, 2001
- Nophodoris Valdés & Gosliner, 2001
