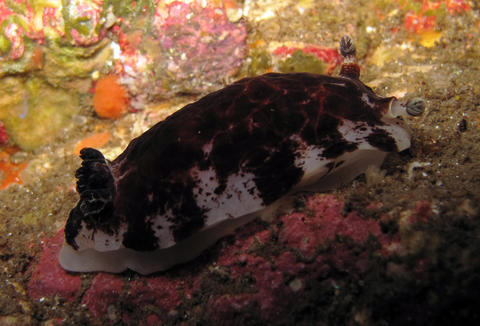

Scientific classification
- Domain: Eukaryota
- Kingdom: Animalia
- Phylum: Mollusca
- Class: Gastropoda
- Order: Nudibranchia
- Family: Dorididae
- Genus: Aphelodoris
- Species: A. luctuosa

Binomial name
- Aphelodoris luctuosa (Cheeseman, 1882)

Synonyms
- Aphelodoris affinis; Aphelodoris cheesemani [unjustified replacement name]; Aphelodoris purpurea; Doris luctuosa [original combination (="basionym" in botany)]

= Aphelodoris luctuosa =

Species of gastropod

Aphelodoris luctuosa is a species of sea slug, a dorid nudibranch, shell-less marine gastropod mollusks in the family Dorididae. It is endemic to New Zealand waters. It must not be confused with Aphelodoris luctuosa Bergh, 1905, which has been renamed Aphelodoris berghi Odhner, 1924, because of the homonymy.
