= Aphelodoris karpa =

Scientific classification
- Kingdom: Animalia
- Phylum: Mollusca
- Class: Gastropoda
- Order: Nudibranchia
- Family: Dorididae
- Genus: Aphelodoris
- Species: A. karpa

Binomial name
- Aphelodoris karpa Wilson, 2003

Species of gastropod

Aphelodoris karpa is a species of sea slug, a dorid nudibranch, shell-less marine gastropod mollusks in the family Dorididae.

== Distribution ==
It is found off the coast of Western Australia.
