= Variable dorid =

Variable dorid is a common name for several species of nudibranchs and may refer to:

- Aphelodoris brunnea, native to Australia
- Aphelodoris varia, native to South Africa
