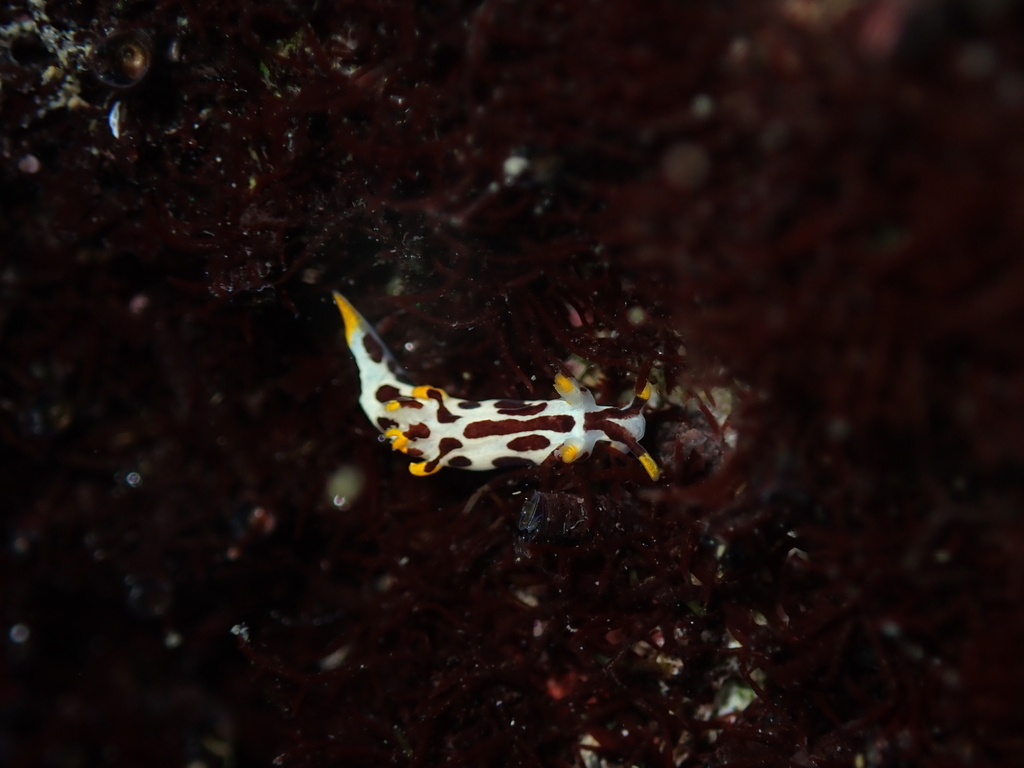

Scientific classification
- Kingdom: Animalia
- Phylum: Mollusca
- Class: Gastropoda
- Order: Nudibranchia
- Family: Goniodorididae
- Genus: Trapania
- Species: T. goslineri

Binomial name
- Trapania goslineri Millen & Bertsch, 2000

= Trapania goslineri =

Species of gastropod

Trapania goslineri is a species of sea slug, a dorid nudibranch, a marine gastropod mollusc in the family Goniodorididae.

== Distribution ==
This species was first described from Bahia de los Angeles, Baja California, Mexico.

== Description ==
The length of the body attains 8 mm. This goniodorid nudibranch is white in colour, with oval black spots and a median black stripe on the body. The tips of the rhinophores, gills, lateral papillae, oral tentacles and tail are golden orange. Trapania darwini has a similar pattern of colour except that the brown patches have white spots within them.

== Ecology ==
Trapania goslineri probably feeds on Entoprocta which often grow on sponges and other living substrata.
