= Aphelodoris pallida =

Scientific classification
- Kingdom: Animalia
- Phylum: Mollusca
- Class: Gastropoda
- Order: Nudibranchia
- Family: Dorididae
- Genus: Aphelodoris
- Species: A. pallida

Binomial name
- Aphelodoris pallida (Bergh, 1905)

Species of gastropod

Aphelodoris pallida is a species of sea slug, a dorid nudibranch, shell-less marine gastropod mollusks in the family Dorididae.
