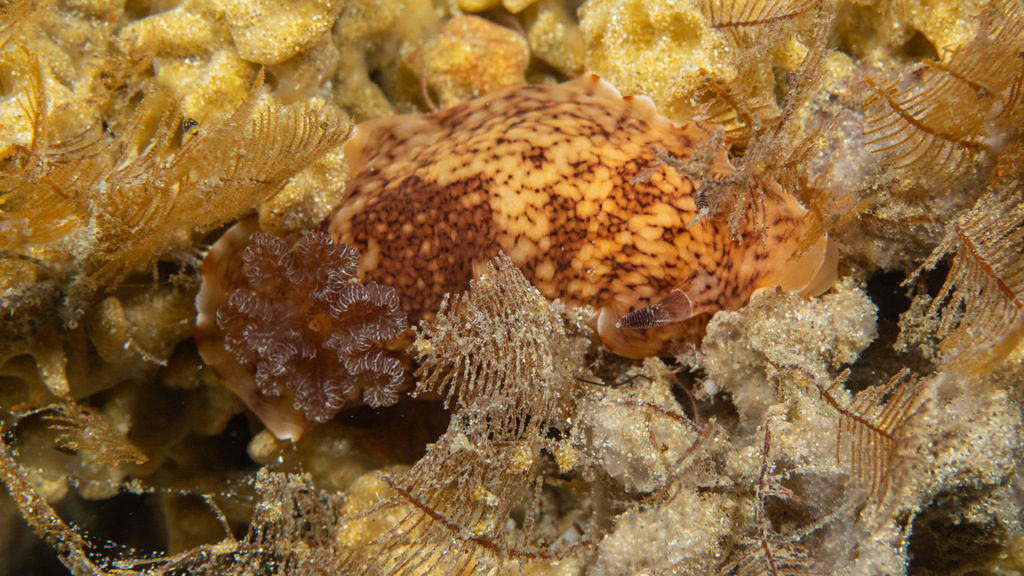

Scientific classification
- Kingdom: Animalia
- Phylum: Mollusca
- Class: Gastropoda
- Order: Nudibranchia
- Family: Dorididae
- Genus: Aphelodoris
- Species: A. rossquicki

Binomial name
- Aphelodoris rossquicki Burn, 1966

= Aphelodoris rossquicki =

Species of gastropod

Aphelodoris rossquicki is a species of sea slug, a dorid nudibranch, shell-less marine gastropod mollusks in the family Dorididae.

== Distribution ==
It is found off the coast of New South Wales.
