= Aphelodoris greeni =

Scientific classification
- Kingdom: Animalia
- Phylum: Mollusca
- Class: Gastropoda
- Order: Nudibranchia
- Family: Dorididae
- Genus: Aphelodoris
- Species: A. greeni

Binomial name
- Aphelodoris greeni Burn, 1966

Species of gastropod

Aphelodoris greeni is a species of sea slug, a dorid nudibranch, shell-less marine gastropod mollusks in the family Dorididae.

== Distribution ==
It is mostly found in Tasmania or nearby islands.
