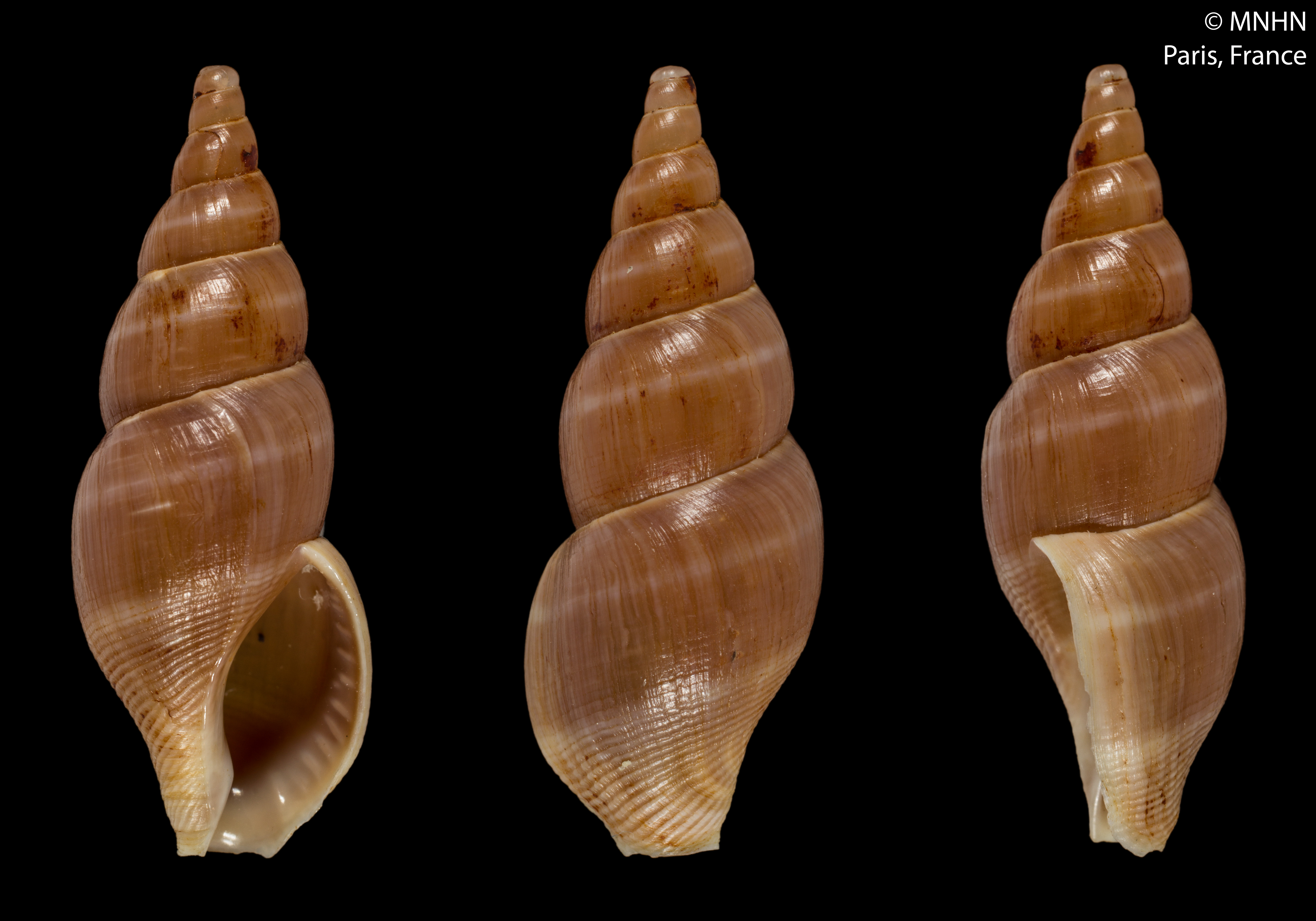
- Shell of Adinassa barcai

Scientific classification
- Kingdom: Animalia
- Phylum: Mollusca
- Class: Gastropoda
- Subclass: Caenogastropoda
- Order: Neogastropoda
- Family: Nassariidae
- Genus: Adinassa; Horro, Schönherr & Rolán, 2018

Type species
- Adinopsis skoogi Odhner, 1923

Synonyms
- Adinopsis Odhner, 1923 (invalid: junior homonym of the beetle Adinopsis Cameron, 1918; Adinassa was the replacement name); Nassarius (Adinopsis) Odhner, 1923

= Adinassa =

Genus of gastropods

Adinassa is a small genus of African sea snails in the family Nassariidae (unassigned in a subfamily). The type species was originally named Adinopsis skoogi in 1923, though the genus name Adinopsis had already been used for a genus of beetles five years earlier. Nearly 100 years later, the genus was renamed Adinassa and two new species were described.

== Species ==
There are three species within the genus Adinassa:

- Adinassa barcai Horro, Schönherr & Rolán, 2018
- Adinassa parrulai Horro, Schönherr & Rolán, 2018
- Adinassa skoogi (Odhner, 1923)
