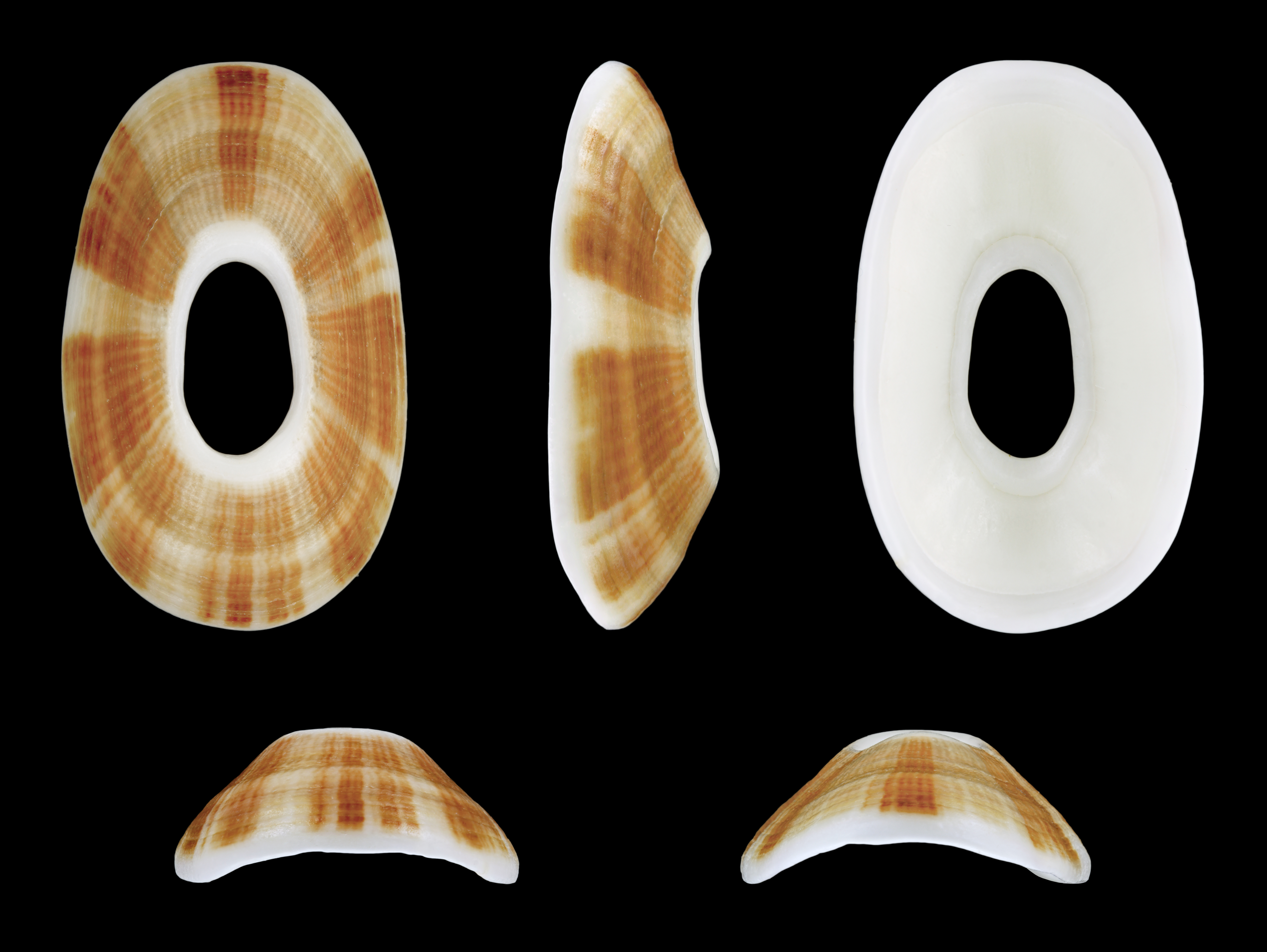
- Pupillaea aperta shell

Scientific classification
- Kingdom: Animalia
- Phylum: Mollusca
- Class: Gastropoda
- Subclass: Vetigastropoda
- Order: Lepetellida
- Family: Fissurellidae
- Subfamily: Emarginulinae
- Genus: Pupillaea; Gray in Sowerby, 1835

Type species
- Fissurella aperta Sowerby I, 1825

= Pupillaea =

Genus of gastropods

Pupillaea is a genus of sea snails, marine gastropod mollusks in the family Fissurellidae, the keyhole limpets.

== Species ==
Species within the genus Pupillaea include:

- Pupillaea annulus (Odhner, 1932)
- Pupillaea aperta (Sowerby I, 1825)
