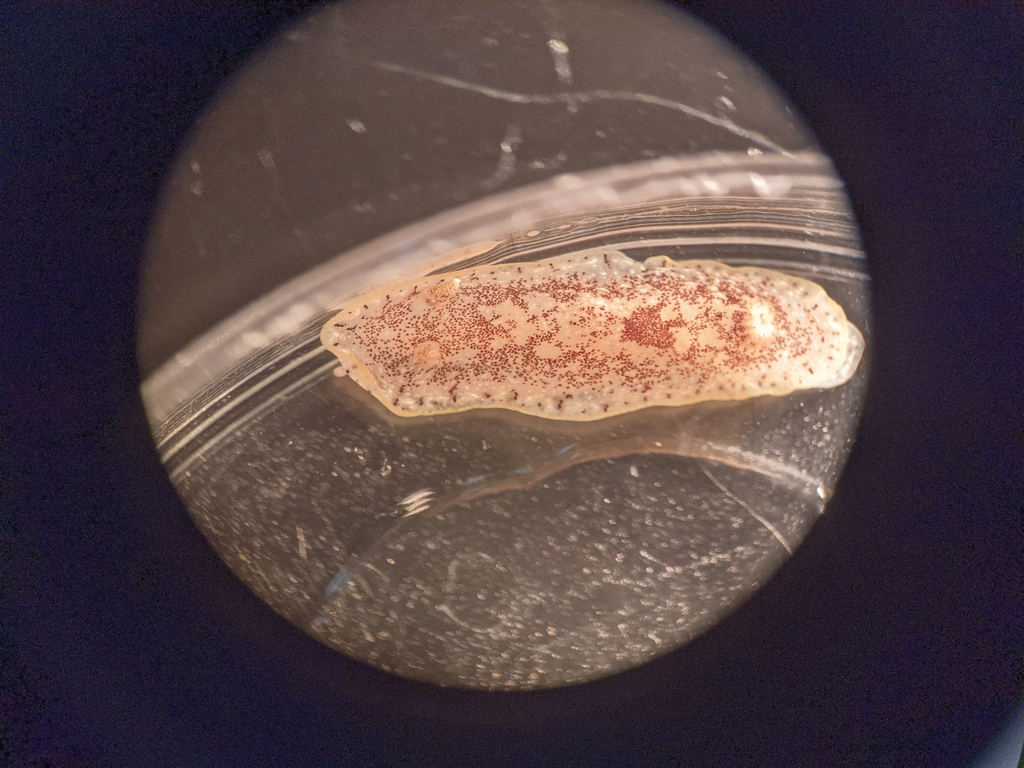

Scientific classification
- Kingdom: Animalia
- Phylum: Mollusca
- Class: Gastropoda
- Order: Nudibranchia
- Family: Dorididae
- Genus: Aphelodoris
- Species: A. antillensis

Binomial name
- Aphelodoris antillensis Bergh, 1879

= Aphelodoris antillensis =

Species of gastropod

Aphelodoris antillensis is a species of sea slug, a dorid nudibranch, shell-less marine gastropod mollusks in the family Dorididae.

== Description ==
The maximum recorded length is 29 mm.

== Habitat ==
Minimum recorded depth is 0.6 m. Maximum recorded depth is 12 m.
