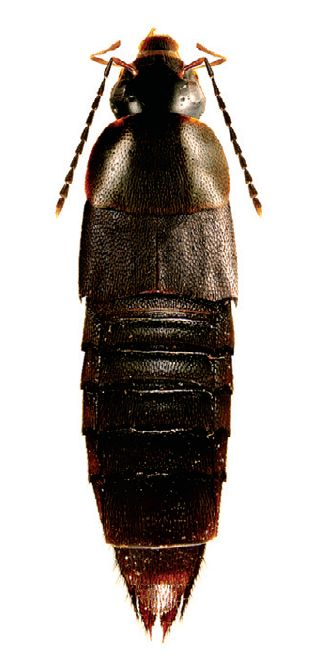
- Gymnusa grandiceps

Scientific classification
- Kingdom: Animalia
- Phylum: Arthropoda
- Class: Insecta
- Order: Coleoptera
- Suborder: Polyphaga
- Infraorder: Staphyliniformia
- Family: Staphylinidae
- Subfamily: Aleocharinae
- Tribe: Gymnusini; Heer, 1839

Synonyms
- Deinopsini

= Gymnusini =

Tribe of beetles

Gymnusini is a tribe of rove beetles in the subfamily Aleocharinae. It is a basal aleocharine group, and they inhabit riparian habitats. It was described in 1839.

The tribe was expanded by a revision in 2017 that synonymized the previously recognized tribe Deinopsini under Gymnusini, which now contains 8 genera:

- Adinopsis Cameron, 1919
- Allodinopsis Ashe, 2002
- †Cretodeinopsis Cai, Chenyang & Diying Huang, 2015
- Deinopsis Matthews, 1838
- †Electrogymnusa Wolf-Schwenninger, 2004
- Gymnusa Gravenhorst, 1806
- Metadeinopsis Klimaszewski, 1979
- Stylogymnusa Hammond, 1975
