= Aphelodoris lawsae =

Scientific classification
- Kingdom: Animalia
- Phylum: Mollusca
- Class: Gastropoda
- Order: Nudibranchia
- Family: Dorididae
- Genus: Aphelodoris
- Species: A. lawsae

Binomial name
- Aphelodoris lawsae Burn, 1966

Species of gastropod

Aphelodoris lawsae is a species of sea slug, a dorid nudibranch, shell-less marine gastropod mollusk in the family Dorididae.

== Distribution ==
It is found off the coasts of South Australia, New South Wales, and Tasmania.
