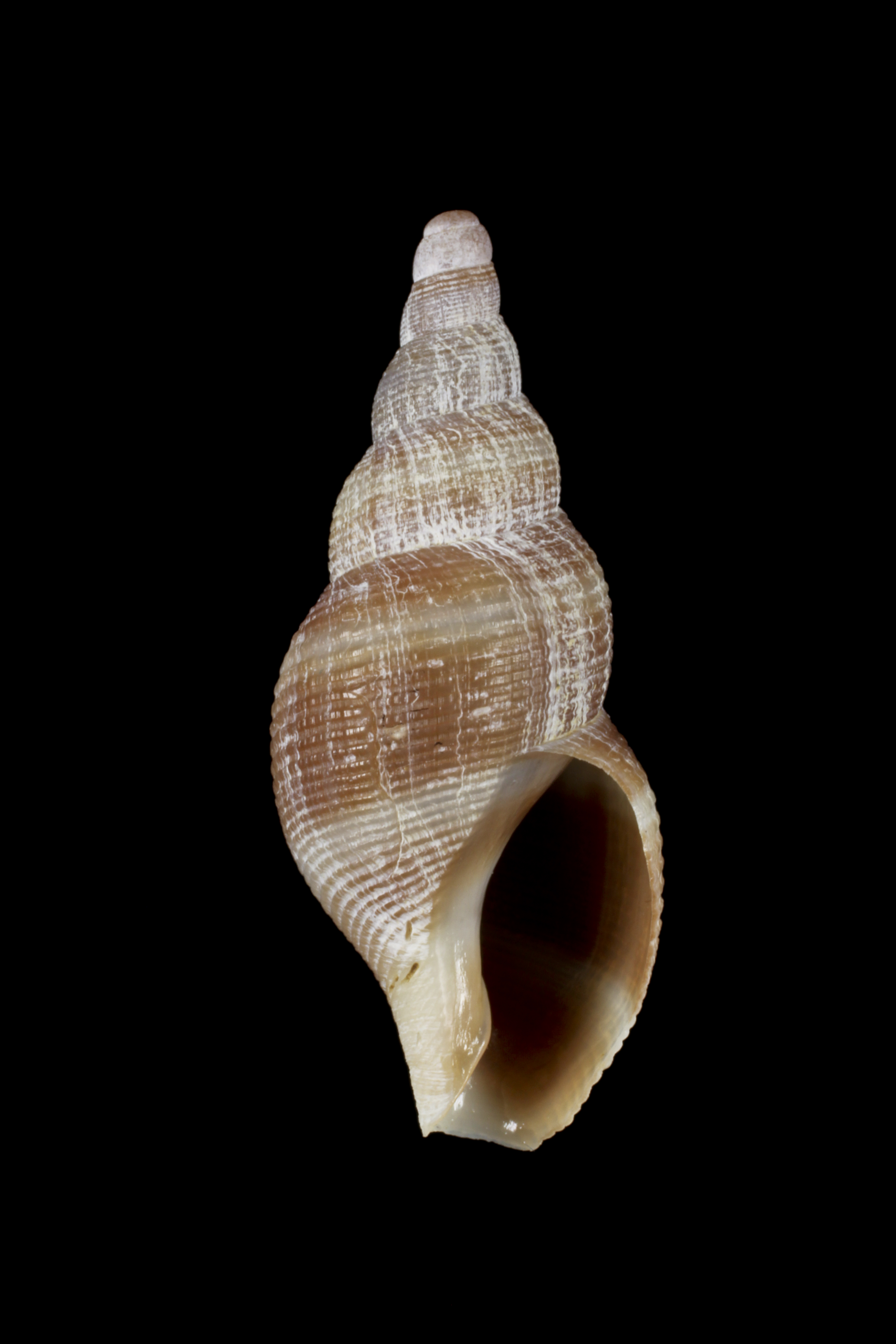
- Shell of Adinassa skoogi (specimen at MNHN, Paris)

Scientific classification
- Kingdom: Animalia
- Phylum: Mollusca
- Class: Gastropoda
- Subclass: Caenogastropoda
- Order: Neogastropoda
- Superfamily: Buccinoidea
- Family: Nassariidae
- Genus: Adinassa
- Species: A. skoogi

Binomial name
- Adinassa skoogi (Odhner, 1923)

Synonyms
- Adinopsis skoogi Odhner, 1923 (original combination); Bullia skoogi (Odhner, 1923); Nassarius skoogi (Odhner, 1923)

= Adinassa skoogi =

Species of gastropod

Adinassa skoogi is a species of sea snail, a marine gastropod mollusk in the family Nassariidae, the Nassa mud snails or dog whelks.

== Distribution ==
This marine species occurs in the Atlantic Ocean off Angola and Namibia.
