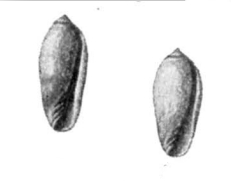
- Shell of Volvarina angolensis (holotype)

Scientific classification
- Kingdom: Animalia
- Phylum: Mollusca
- Class: Gastropoda
- Subclass: Caenogastropoda
- Order: Neogastropoda
- Family: Marginellidae
- Subfamily: Marginellinae
- Genus: Volvarina
- Species: V. angolensis

Binomial name
- Volvarina angolensis (Odhner, 1923)

Synonyms
- Marginella angolensis Odhner, 1923

= Volvarina angolensis =

Species of gastropod

Volvarina angolensis is a species of sea snail, a marine gastropod mollusk in the family Marginellidae, the margin snails.

== Distribution ==
This marine species occurs in the Atlantic Ocean off Angola.
