= Pupillaea annulus =

Scientific classification
- Kingdom: Animalia
- Phylum: Mollusca
- Class: Gastropoda
- Subclass: Vetigastropoda
- Order: Lepetellida
- Family: Fissurellidae
- Subfamily: Emarginulinae
- Genus: Pupillaea
- Species: P. annulus

Binomial name
- Pupillaea annulus (Odhner, 1932)

Synonyms
- Fissurellidea annulus Odhner, 1932

Species of gastropod

Pupillaea annulus is a species of sea snail, a marine gastropod mollusk in the family Fissurellidae, the keyhole limpets and slit limpets.
