= Homoiodorididae =

Historic group of molluscs

Homoiodorididae O'Donoghue, 1924, was considered in the past to be a taxonomic family of nudibranchs, marine gastropod molluscs in the order Opisthobranchia.

== Genera ==
Genera that were placed within the family Homoiodorididae included:

- Dendrodoris Ehrenberg, 1831 : now in the family Dendrodorididae
- Doriopsilla Bergh, 1880 : now in the family Dendrodorididae
- Homoiodoris Bergh, 1904 : now in the family Dorididae
