= Trapania darwini =

Scientific classification
- Kingdom: Animalia
- Phylum: Mollusca
- Class: Gastropoda
- Order: Nudibranchia
- Family: Goniodorididae
- Genus: Trapania
- Species: T. darwini

Binomial name
- Trapania darwini Gosliner & Fahey, 2008

Species of gastropod

Trapania darwini is a species of sea slug, a dorid nudibranch, a marine gastropod mollusc in the family Goniodorididae.

== Distribution ==
This species was first described from Española Island, Galapagos Islands.

== Description ==
This goniodorid nudibranch is translucent white in colour, with an reticulate pattern of brown patches on the body. The tips of the rhinophores, gills, lateral papillae, oral tentacles and tail are yellow. Trapania goslineri has a similar pattern of colour except that the brown patches do not have white spots within them.

== Ecology ==
Trapania darwini probably feeds on Entoprocta which often grow on sponges and other living substrata.
