= Artachaea =

Scientific classification
- Kingdom: Animalia
- Phylum: Mollusca
- Class: Gastropoda
- Order: Nudibranchia
- Family: Dorididae
- Genus: Artachaea; Bergh, 1881
- Species: A. rubida

Binomial name
- Artachaea rubida Bergh, 1881

Genus of molluscs

Artachaea is a genus of sea slugs, a dorid nudibranch, a shell-less marine gastropod mollusc in the family Dorididae containing only one species, Artachaea rubida.

== Species ==
The genus Artachaea includes only one species:

- Artachaea rubida Bergh, 1881

== Distribution ==
This species was described from the island of Cebu in the Philippines.
