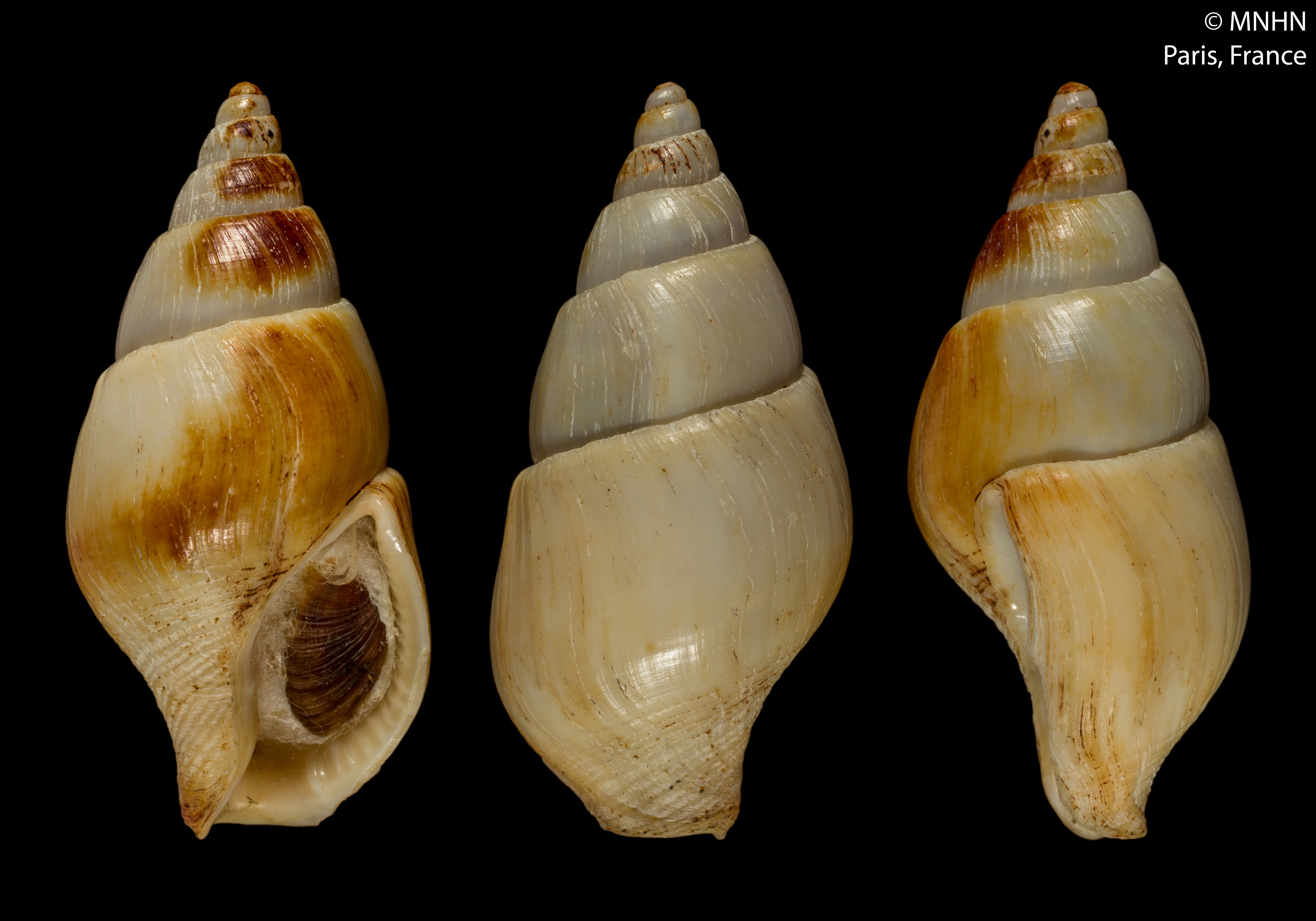
- Shell of Adinassa parrulai (paratype at MNHN, Paris)

Scientific classification
- Kingdom: Animalia
- Phylum: Mollusca
- Class: Gastropoda
- Subclass: Caenogastropoda
- Order: Neogastropoda
- Superfamily: Buccinoidea
- Family: Nassariidae
- Genus: Adinassa
- Species: A. parrulai

Binomial name
- Adinassa parrulai Horro, Schönherr & Rolán, 2018

= Adinassa parrulai =

Species of gastropod

Adinassa parrulai is a species of sea snail, a marine gastropod mollusk in the family Nassariidae, the Nassa mud snails or dog whelks.

== Description ==
The length of the shell attains 38.5 mm.

== Distribution ==
This marine species occurs off Cabinda, Angola at depths between 100 m and 150 m.
