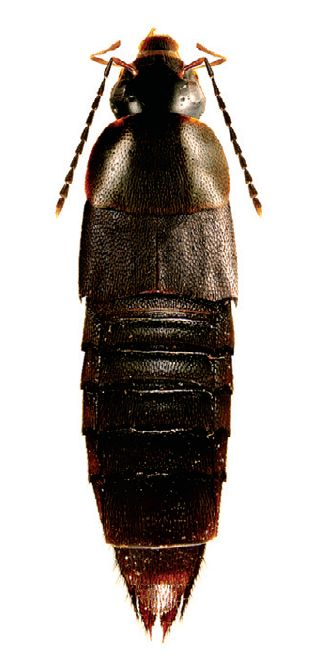
- Gymnusa grandiceps

Scientific classification
- Kingdom: Animalia
- Phylum: Arthropoda
- Class: Insecta
- Order: Coleoptera
- Suborder: Polyphaga
- Infraorder: Staphyliniformia
- Family: Staphylinidae
- Subfamily: Aleocharinae
- Genus: Gymnusa; Gravenhorst, 1806

Species
- †Gymnusa absens (Scudder, 1900); Gymnusa anatolica Korge, 1971; †Gymnusa antiqua A.M. Łomnicki, 1894; Gymnusa atra Casey, 1911; Gymnusa brevicollis (Paykull, 1800); Gymnusa campbelli Klimaszewski, 1979; Gymnusa grandiceps Casey, 1915; Gymnusa inexspectata Klimaszewski, 1979; Gymnusa konopackii Klimaszewski, 1979; Gymnusa lindrothi Klimaszewski & Langor, 2011; Gymnusa miyashitai Naomi, 1994; Gymnusa pseudovariegata Klimaszewski, 1979; Gymnusa smetanai Klimaszewski, 1979; Gymnusa variegata Kiesenwetter, 1845

= Gymnusa =

Genus of beetles

Gymnusa is a genus of rove beetles in the subfamily Aleocharinae and tribe Gymnusini. The coloration of this genus is highly coherent, with most species black and a few dark, dark brown. They range in length from 4.2 millimeters to 6.5 millimeters.

Gymnusa live in semi-aquatic and aquatic environments, but never marine: they live in detritus in swamps, in bogs, streams, and slow-moving rivers. They live in the Nearctic and Palearctic in Europe and North America.
