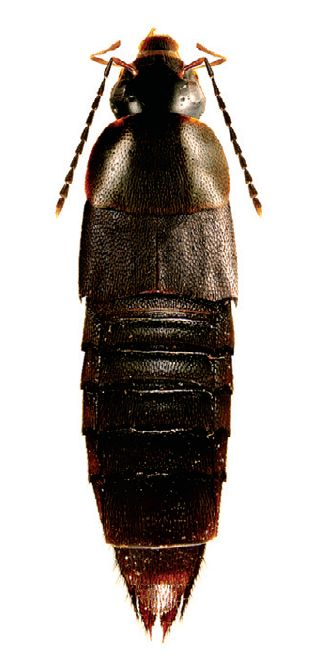

Scientific classification
- Kingdom: Animalia
- Phylum: Arthropoda
- Class: Insecta
- Order: Coleoptera
- Suborder: Polyphaga
- Infraorder: Staphyliniformia
- Family: Staphylinidae
- Genus: Gymnusa
- Species: G. grandiceps

Binomial name
- Gymnusa grandiceps Casey, 1915

= Gymnusa grandiceps =

Species of beetle

Gymnusa grandiceps is a species of rove beetle in the family Staphylinidae. It is found in North America.
