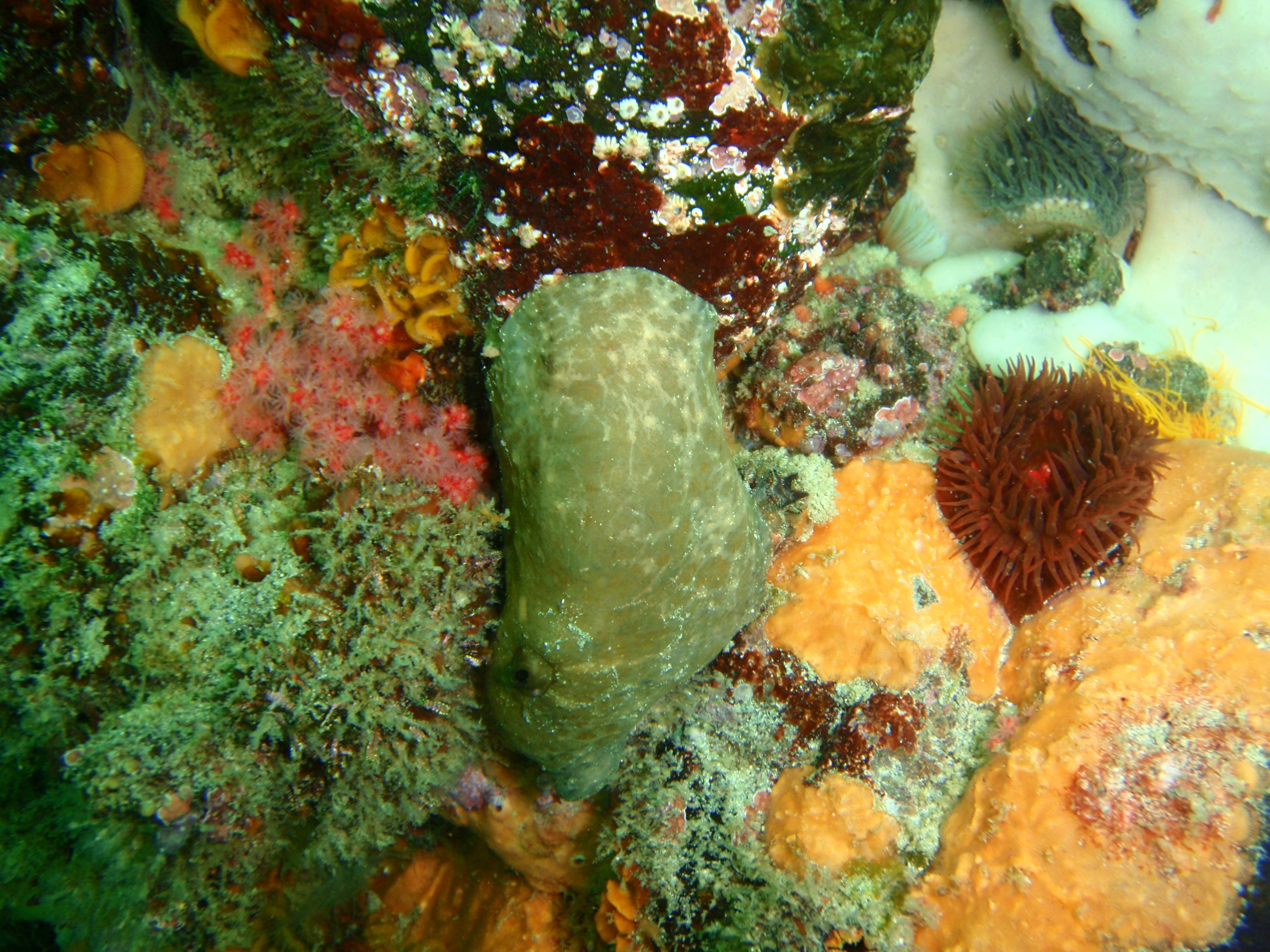

Scientific classification
- Kingdom: Animalia
- Phylum: Mollusca
- Class: Gastropoda
- Subclass: Vetigastropoda
- Order: Lepetellida
- Family: Fissurellidae
- Genus: Pupillaea
- Species: P. aperta

Binomial name
- Pupillaea aperta (Sowerby I, 1825)

Synonyms
- Fissurella aperta Sowerby I, 1825; Fissurellidea aperta (Sowerby I, 1825)

= Pupillaea aperta =

Species of gastropod

Pupillaea aperta, common name the mantled keyhole limpet, is a species of sea snail, a marine gastropod mollusk in the family Fissurellidae, the keyhole limpets.

== Description ==
The size of the shell varies between 23 mm and 50 mm.

Pupillaea aperta has a flattened shell with an aperture on the peak. It also varies in color.

== Distribution ==
This marine species occurs off Namibia to North Transkei, South Africa.

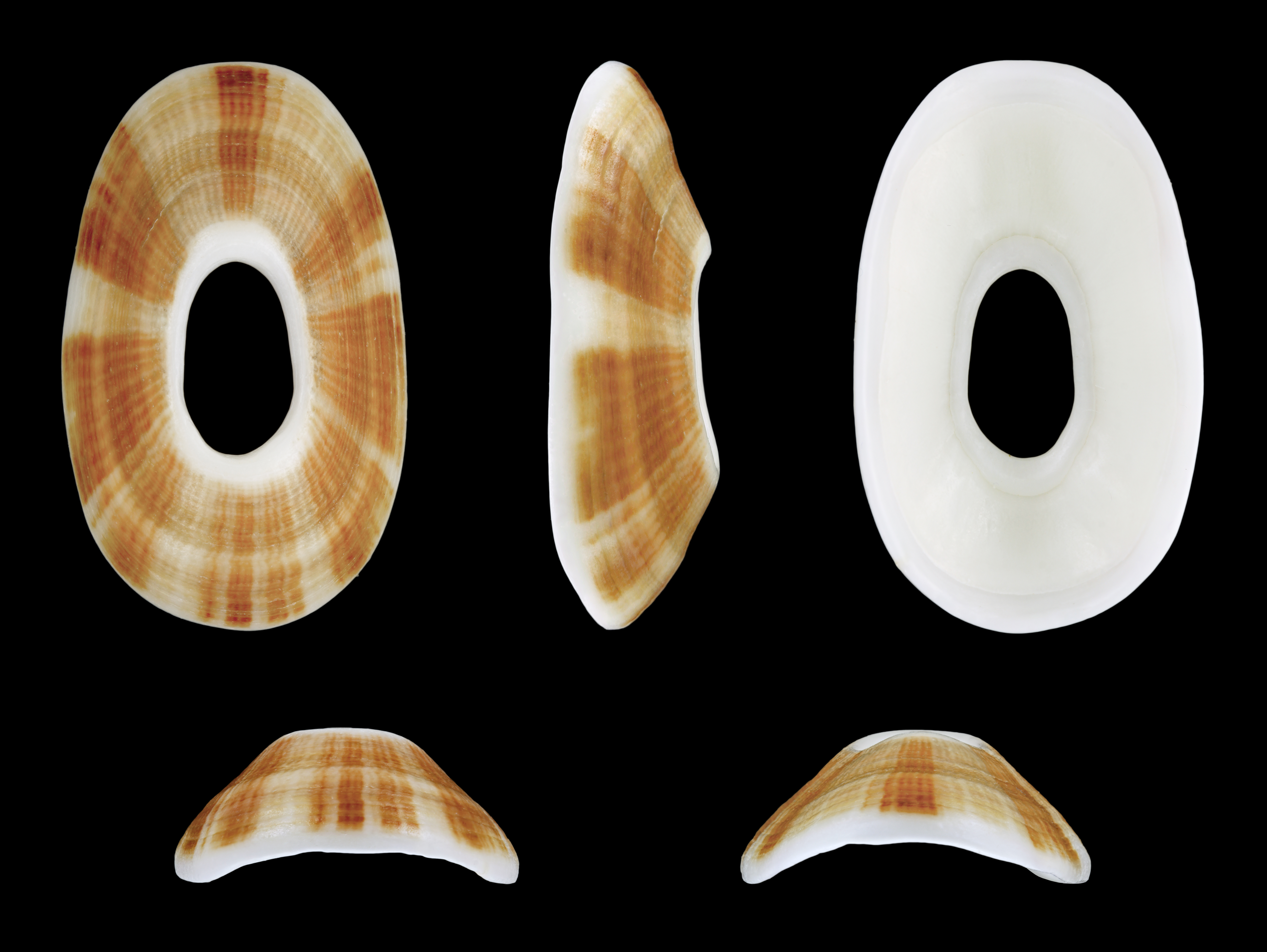
Shell
