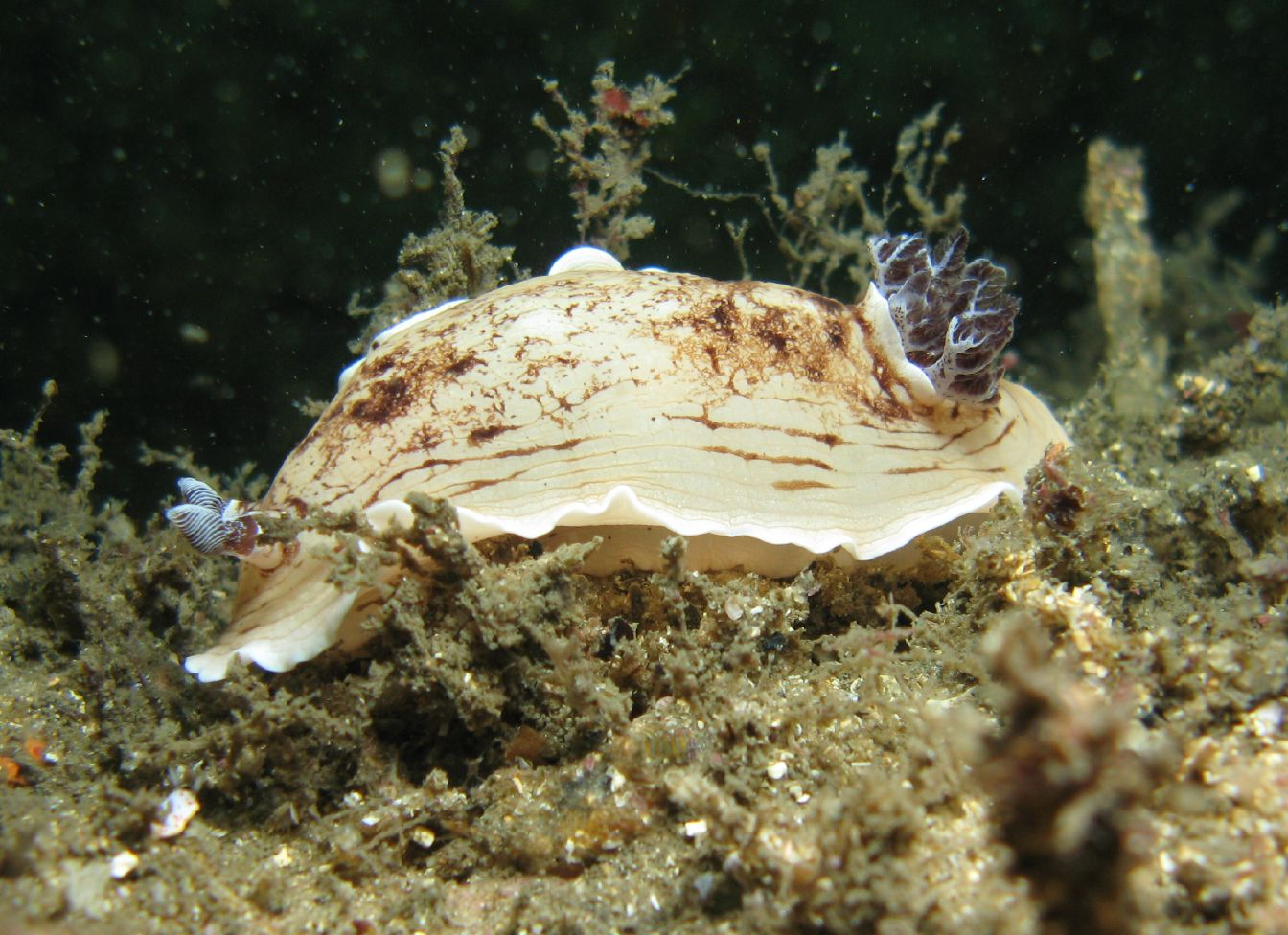

Scientific classification
- Domain: Eukaryota
- Kingdom: Animalia
- Phylum: Mollusca
- Class: Gastropoda
- Order: Nudibranchia
- Family: Dorididae
- Genus: Aphelodoris
- Species: A. varia

Binomial name
- Aphelodoris varia (Abraham, 1877)

= Aphelodoris varia =

Species of gastropod

Aphelodoris varia is a species of sea slug, a dorid nudibranch, a shell-less marine gastropod mollusk in the family Dorididae.

== Taxonomic history ==
This species was described by Abraham in 1864 as Doris variabilis but this name is preoccupied by Doris variabilis Kelaart, 1858.

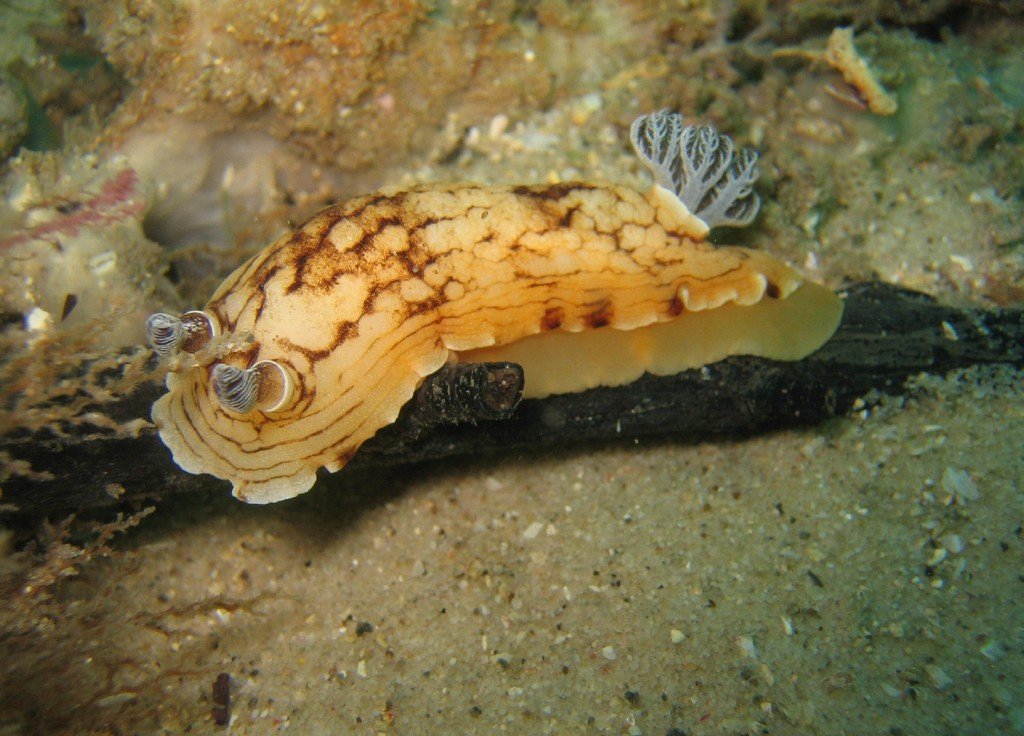
Aphelodoris varia

== Distribution ==
This species is recorded from New South Wales, Australia.
