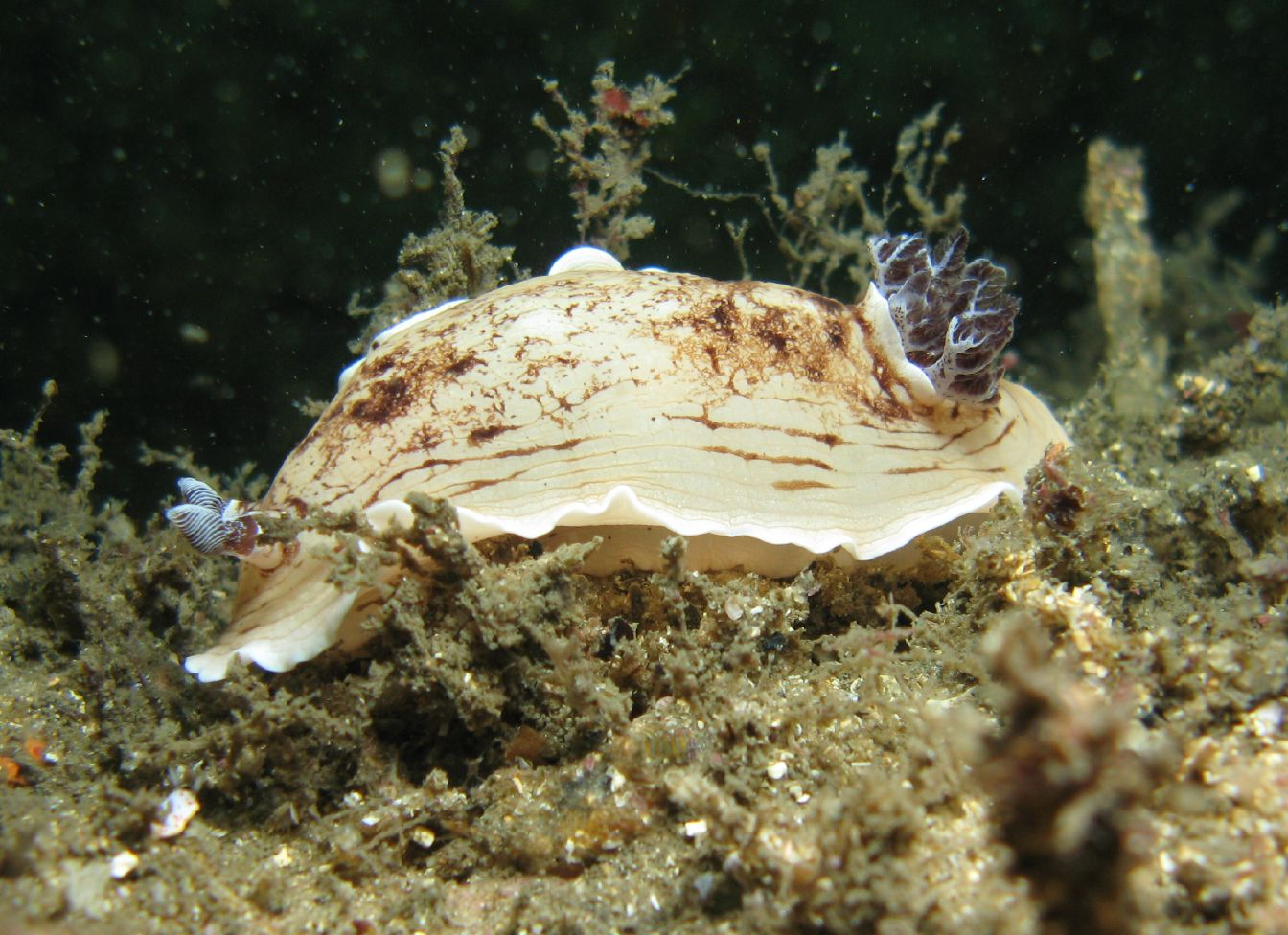
- Aphelodoris varia

Scientific classification
- Kingdom: Animalia
- Phylum: Mollusca
- Class: Gastropoda
- Order: Nudibranchia
- Family: Dorididae
- Genus: Aphelodoris; Bergh, 1879

Type species
- Aphelodoris antillensis Bergh, 1879

= Aphelodoris =

Genus of gastropods

Aphelodoris is a genus of dorid nudibranch, a shell-less marine gastropod mollusc (a sea slug) in the family Dorididae.

== Species ==
WoRMS recognizes 10 species in the genus Aphelodoris:

- Aphelodoris antillensis Bergh, 1879
- Aphelodoris berghi Odhner, 1924
- Aphelodoris brunnea Bergh, 1907
- Aphelodoris gigas Wilson, 2003
- Aphelodoris greeni Burn, 1966
- Aphelodoris karpa Wilson, 2003
- Aphelodoris lawsae Burn, 1966
- Aphelodoris luctuosa (Cheeseman, 1882)
- Aphelodoris rossquicki Burn, 1966
- Aphelodoris varia (Abraham, 1877)

Additionally, Aphelodoris pallida (Bergh, 1905) and Aphelodoris juliae Burn, 1966 is sometimes recognized.
