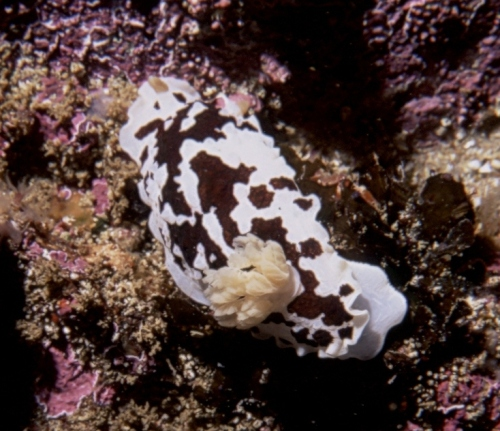
- A live individual of Aphelodoris brunnea in situ, head end towards the upper left

Scientific classification
- Kingdom: Animalia
- Phylum: Mollusca
- Class: Gastropoda
- Order: Nudibranchia
- Family: Dorididae
- Genus: Aphelodoris
- Species: A. brunnea

Binomial name
- Aphelodoris brunnea Bergh, 1907

= Aphelodoris brunnea =

Species of gastropod

Aphelodoris brunnea, the variable dorid, is a species of dorid nudibranch, a marine gastropod mollusc in the family Dorididae.

== Distribution ==
This species is endemic to South Africa, where it is known from Buffels Bay near Cape Point to East London. It is common off Port Elizabeth and is found from the low intertidal to 15 m.

== Description ==
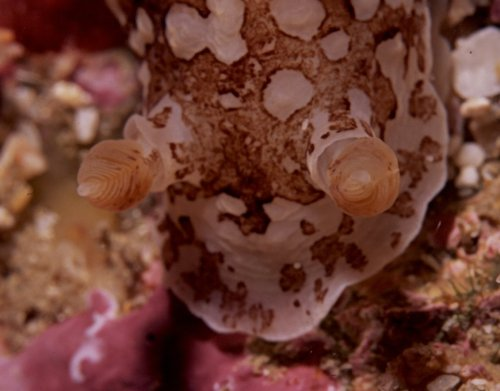
A close-up of the rhinophores of the variable dorid

The variable dorid is a drably coloured nudibranch with a pale body and variable brown patterning. It has eight gills arranged around the anus and its rhinophores are perfoliate. It may reach a total length of 45 mm.

== Ecology ==
The variable dorid probably feeds on sponges. When disturbed, the animal tries to escape by swimming, flexing its body up and down.
