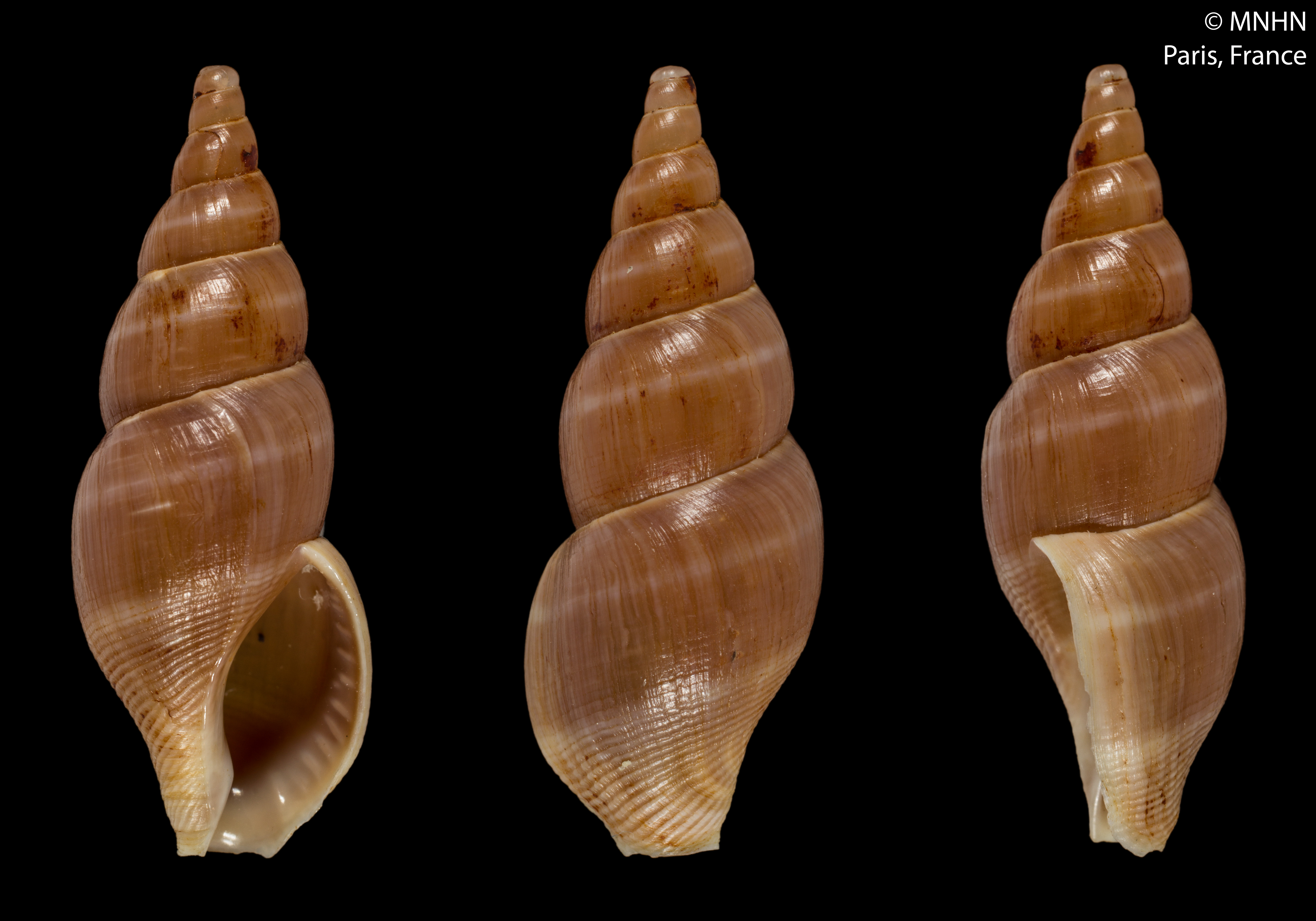
- Shell of Adinassa barcai (paratype at MNHN, Paris)

Scientific classification
- Kingdom: Animalia
- Phylum: Mollusca
- Class: Gastropoda
- Subclass: Caenogastropoda
- Order: Neogastropoda
- Superfamily: Buccinoidea
- Family: Nassariidae
- Genus: Adinassa
- Species: A. barcai

Binomial name
- Adinassa barcai Horro, Schönherr & Rolán, 2018

= Adinassa barcai =

Species of gastropod

Adinassa barcai is a species of sea snail, a marine gastropod mollusk in the family Nassariidae, the Nassa mud snails or dog whelks.

== Description ==
The length of the shell attains 29.6 mm (1.17 in).

== Distribution ==
This marine species occurs off Angola at depths between 40 and 50 m (130 and 160 ft).
