= Pharodoris =

Scientific classification
- Kingdom: Animalia
- Phylum: Mollusca
- Class: Gastropoda
- Order: Nudibranchia
- Family: Dorididae
- Genus: Pharodoris; Valdés, 2001

Genus of gastropods

Pharodoris is a genus of sea slugs, a dorid nudibranch, a shell-less marine gastropod mollusc in the family Dorididae.

== Species ==
Species in the genus Pharodoris includes:

- Pharodoris diaphora Valdés, 2001
- Pharodoris philippinensis Valdés, 2001
