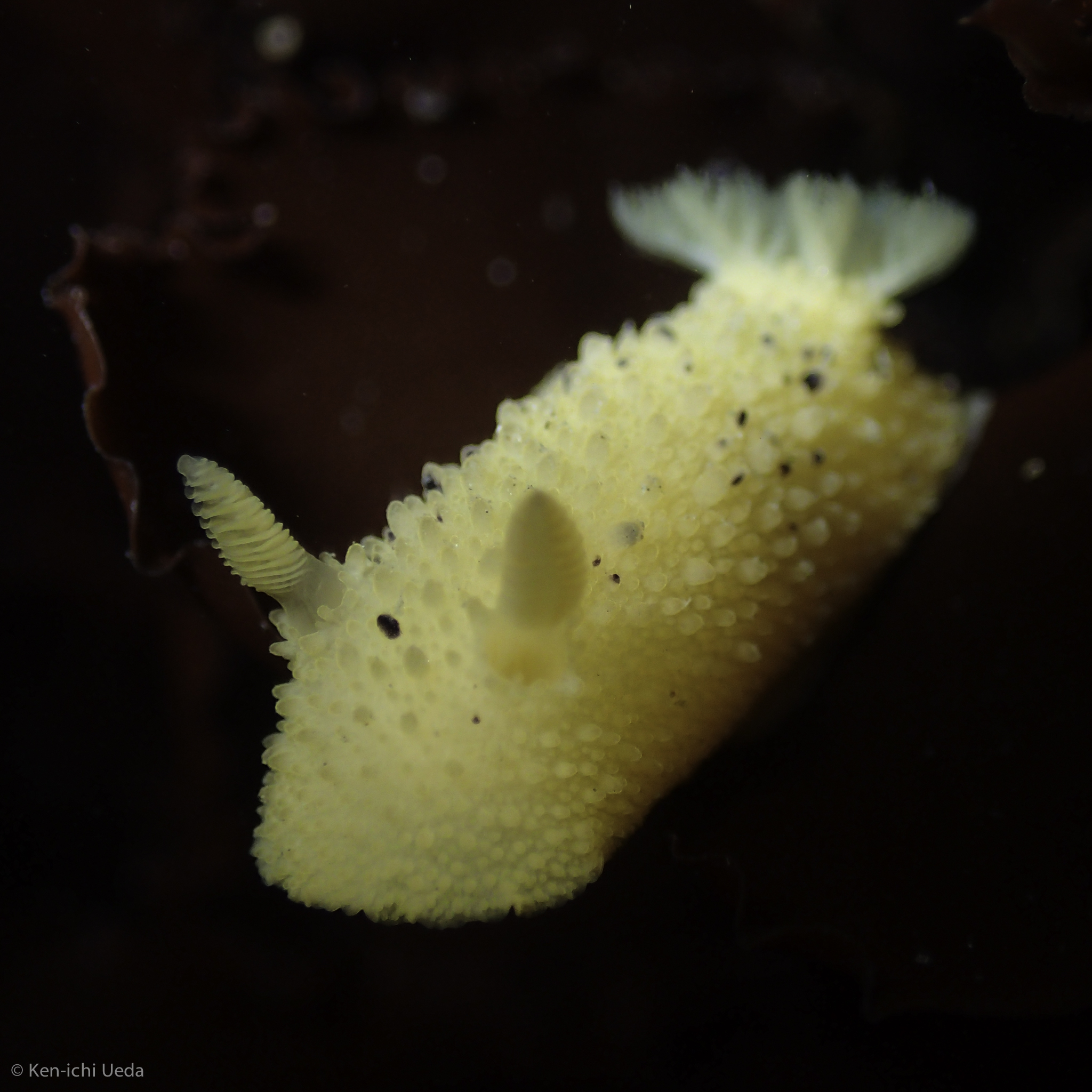

Scientific classification
- Domain: Eukaryota
- Kingdom: Animalia
- Phylum: Mollusca
- Class: Gastropoda
- Order: Nudibranchia
- Family: Dorididae
- Genus: Doris
- Species: D. montereyensis

Binomial name
- Doris montereyensis (Cooper, 1862)

Synonyms
- Archidoris montereyensis (Cooper, 1862)

= Doris montereyensis =

Species of gastropod

Doris montereyensis is a species of sea slug, a dorid nudibranch, a shell-less marine gastropod mollusk in the family Dorididae.

== Description ==
Doris montereyensis is similar in shape and colour to Anisodoris nobilis but instead of the gills being white they are yellow which is the same as the mantle. Dark pigment usually covers the tubercles.

== Distribution ==
This species has been recorded from Alaska to San Diego, California.
