= Goslineria =

Scientific classification
- Kingdom: Animalia
- Phylum: Mollusca
- Class: Gastropoda
- Order: Nudibranchia
- Family: Dorididae
- Genus: Goslineria; Valdés, 2001

Genus of gastropods

Goslineria is a genus of sea slugs, a dorid nudibranch, a shell-less marine gastropod mollusc in the family Dorididae.

== Species ==
Species in the genus Goslineria includes:

- Goslineria callosa Valdés, 2001
