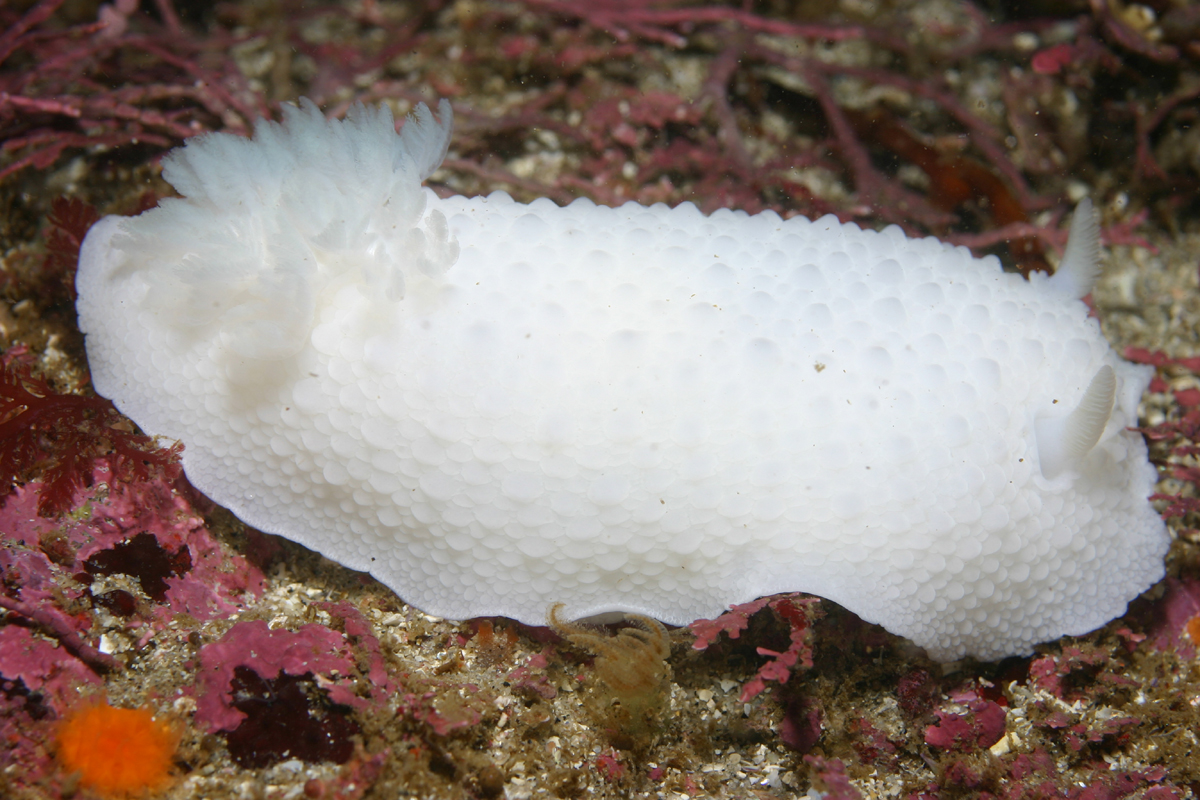

Scientific classification
- Kingdom: Animalia
- Phylum: Mollusca
- Class: Gastropoda
- Order: Nudibranchia
- Family: Dorididae
- Genus: Doris
- Species: D. odhneri

Binomial name
- Doris odhneri MacFarland, 1966

Synonyms
- Archidoris odhneri (MacFarland, 1966)

= Doris odhneri =

Species of gastropod

Doris odhneri is a species of sea slug, a dorid nudibranch, a shell-less marine gastropod mollusk in the family Dorididae. It is known by many common names, such as: giant white nudibranch, giant white dorid, and white-knight nudibranch. It is also often referred to as Odhner's dorid to honor Nils Hjalmar Odhner, the scientist it is named after.

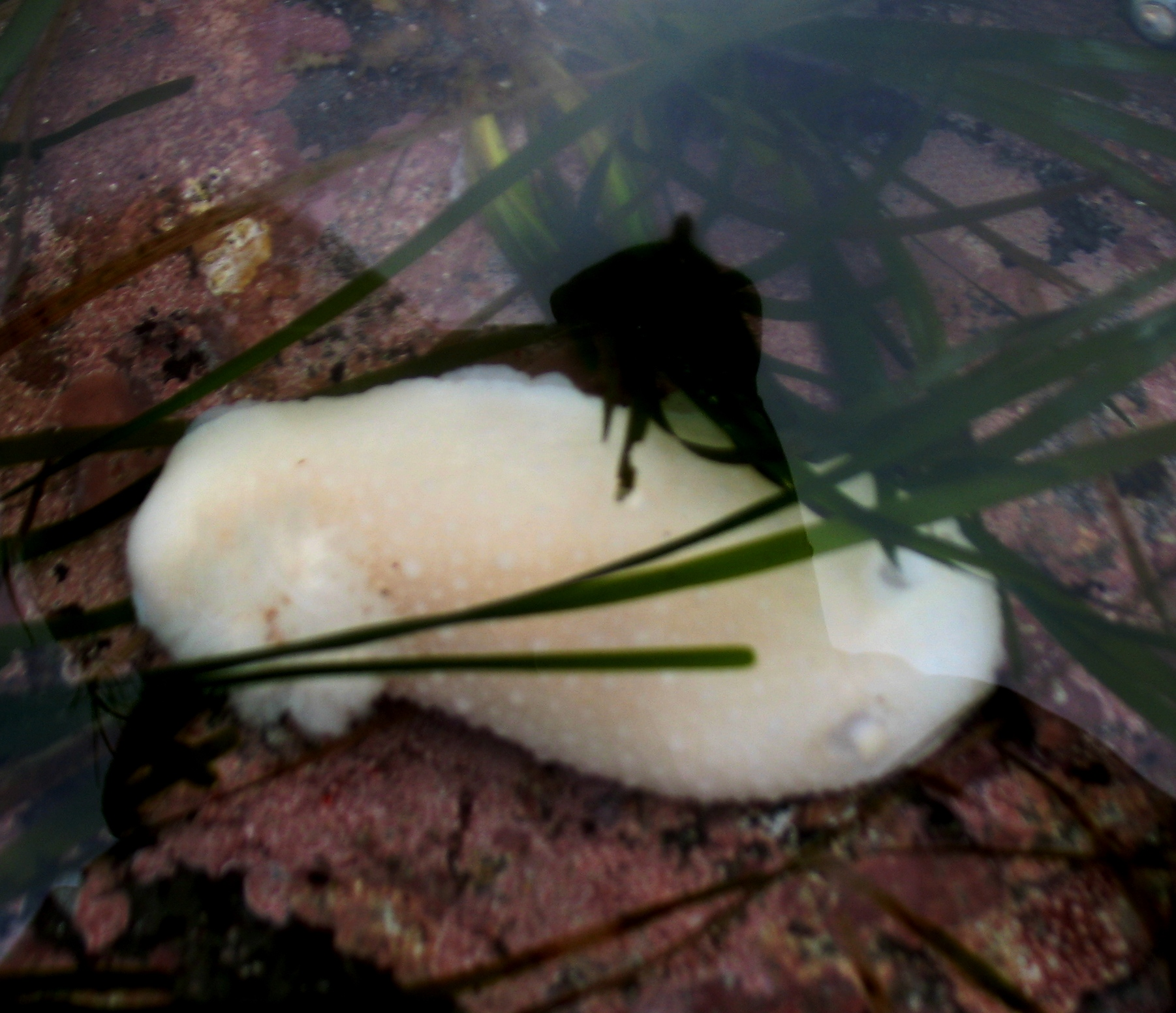
Doris odhneri

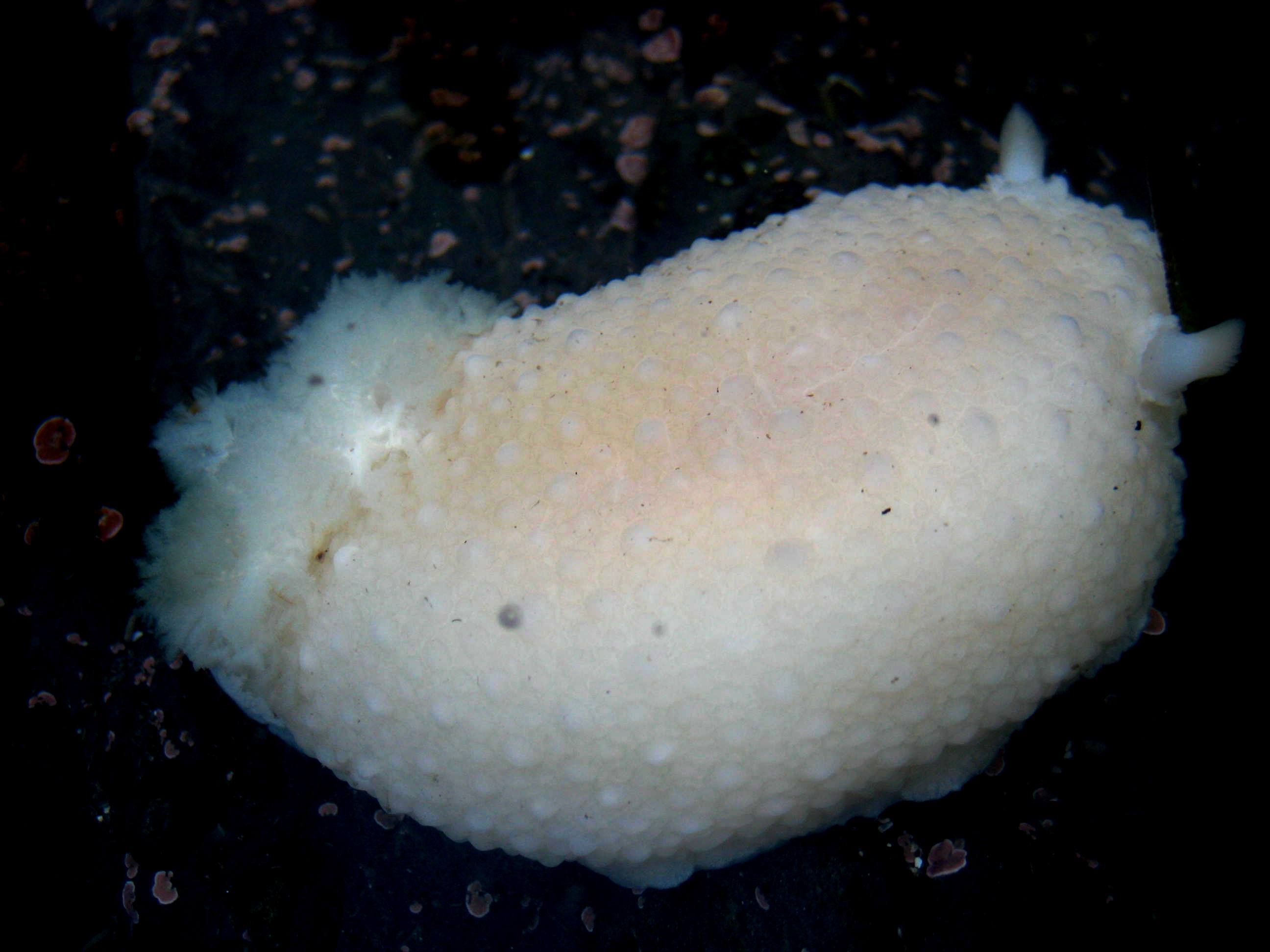
Doris odhneri

== Description ==
Doris odhneri is the largest nudibranch on the California coast, measuring up to 20 cm. It is completely white in color with no markings, however anomalies with a yellowish hue have been described in the Puget Sound region. A conspicuous characteristic of this nudibranch is its gill. It is composed of seven fluffy plumes and its rhinophores have 20 to 24 lamellae.

== Life habits ==
Their diet consists of sponges, mostly Halichondria. It is rarely found in the intertidal, and is more likely to be found in the subtidal to 75 ft. Like most nudibranchs, Doris odhneri is hermaphroditic and mates with the right sides of the body together. Elegant ribbon-like egg masses are laid and attached to hard substrates.

== Distribution ==
Doris odheri can be found from Kenai Peninsula, Alaska to Point Loma, California. They have also been discovered in Korea.
