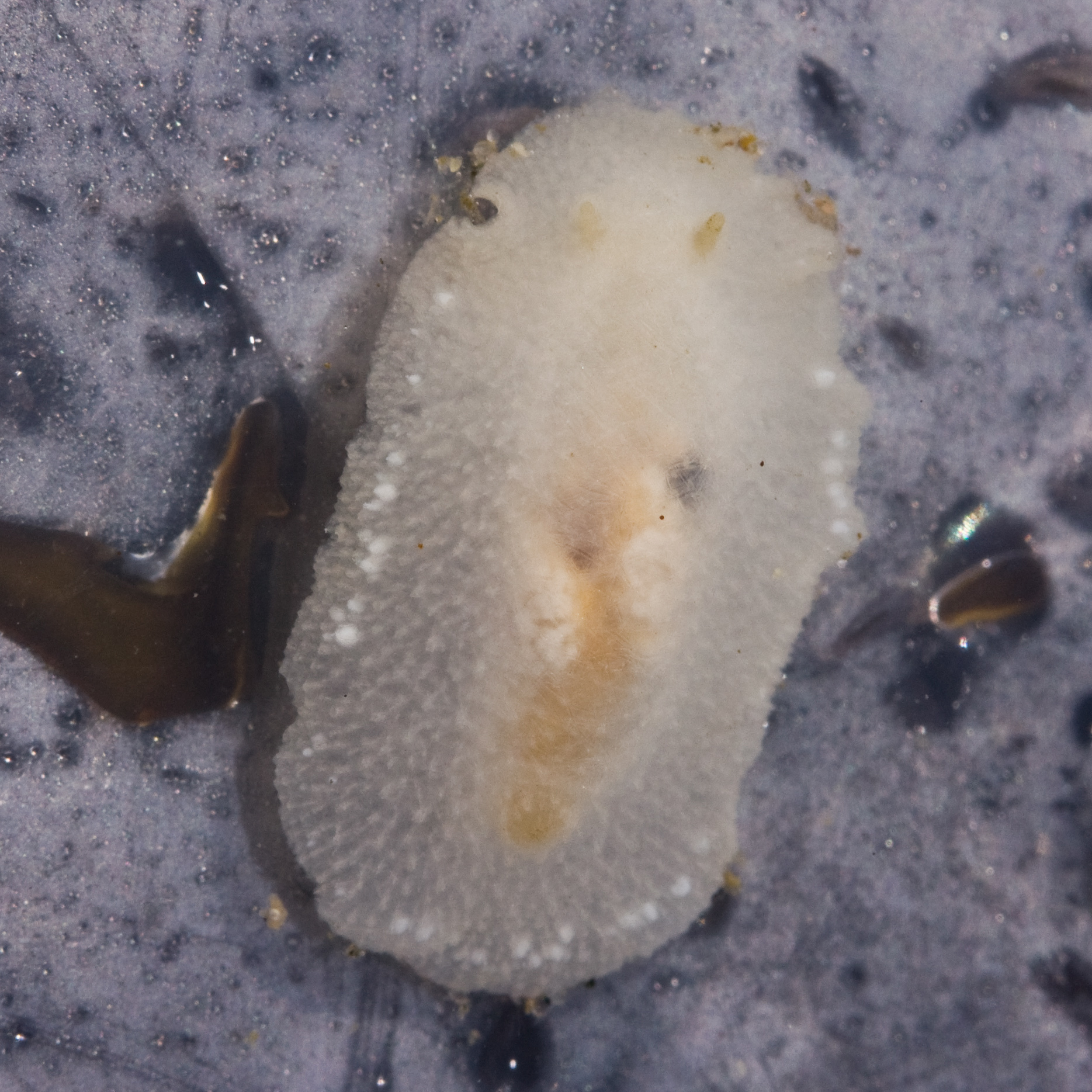
- Conualevia alba

Scientific classification
- Domain: Eukaryota
- Kingdom: Animalia
- Phylum: Mollusca
- Class: Gastropoda
- Order: Nudibranchia
- Family: Dorididae
- Genus: Conualevia; Collier & Farmer, 1964

= Conualevia =

Genus of gastropods

Conualevia is a genus of sea slugs, shell-less marine dorid nudibranchs in the family Dorididae.

== Species ==
The following species are recognised in the genus Conualevia:

- Conualevia alba Collier & Farmer, 1964
- Conualevia marcusi Collier & Farmer, 1964
- Conualevia mizuna Marcus & Marcus, 1967
