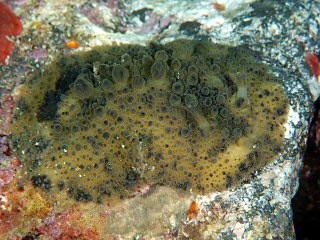

Scientific classification
- Kingdom: Animalia
- Phylum: Mollusca
- Class: Gastropoda
- Order: Nudibranchia
- Family: Dorididae
- Genus: Homoiodoris; Bergh, 1881

= Homoiodoris =

Genus of gastropods

Homoiodoris is a genus of sea slugs, dorid nudibranchs, shell-less marine gastropod mollusks in the family Dorididae.

This is a nomen dubium.

== Species ==
Species in the genus Homoiodoris include:

- Homoiodoris japonica Bergh, 1882
