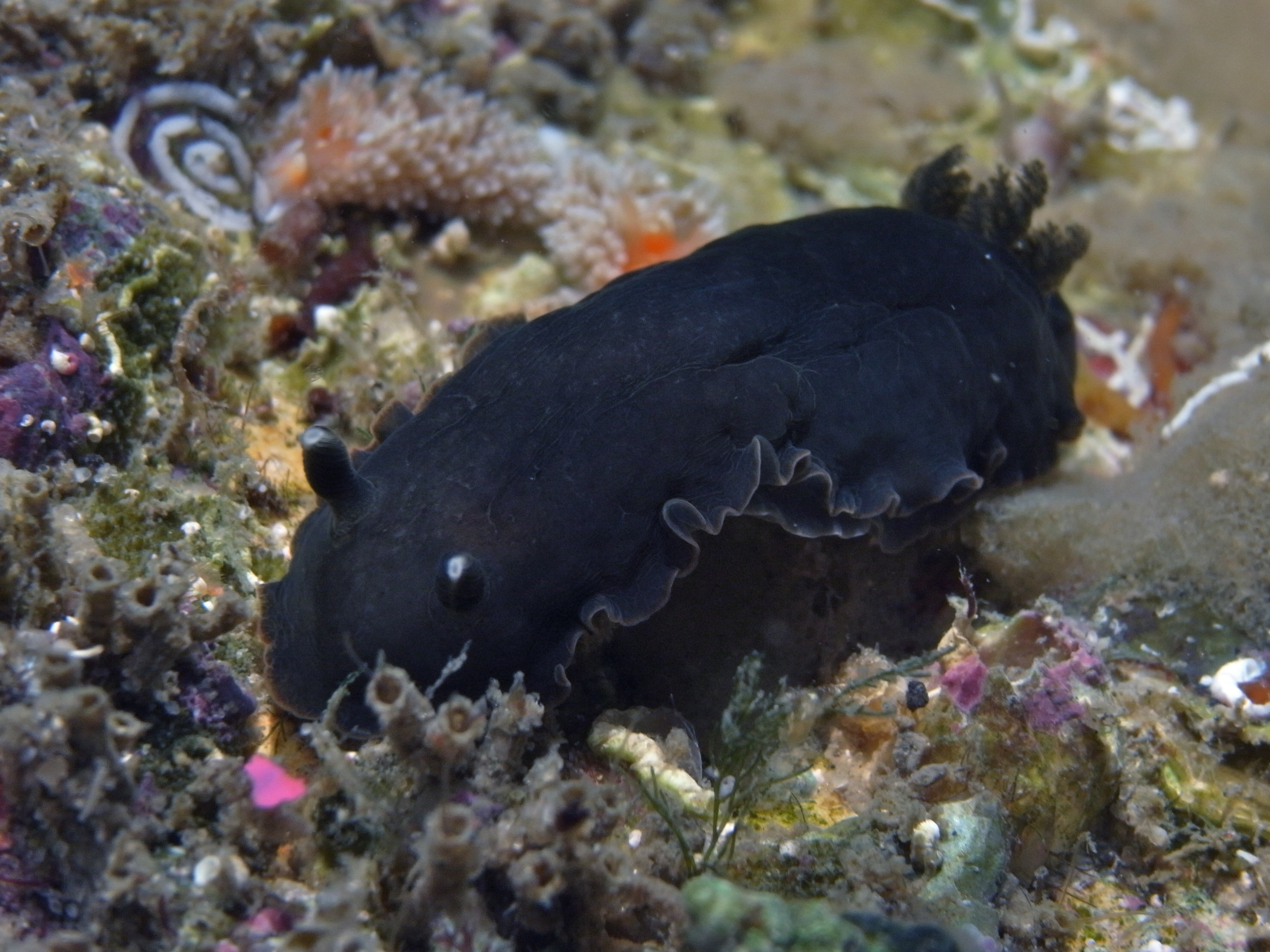
- Dendrodoris nigra

Scientific classification
- Kingdom: Animalia
- Phylum: Mollusca
- Class: Gastropoda
- Order: Nudibranchia
- Family: Dendrodorididae
- Genus: Dendrodoris
- Species: D. nigra

Binomial name
- Dendrodoris nigra Odhner, 1924

Synonyms
- Actinodoris australis Angas, 1864; Aphelodoris brunnea (Bergh, 1890); Dendrodoris australiensis (Abraham, 1877); Dendrodoris melaena Allan, 1932; Doridopsis australiensis Abraham, 1877; Doridopsis macfarlandi Ostergaard, 1955; Doridopsis mollis Risbec, 1928; Doridopsis nigra (Stimpson, 1855); Doriopsis nigra (Simpson, 1855); Doriopsis nigra var. brunnea Bergh, 1890; Doriopsis nigra var. coerulea Bergh, 1880; Doriopsis nigra var. luteopunctata Bergh, 1905; Doriopsis nigra var. nigerrima Bergh, 1888; Doris atroviridis Kelaart, 1858; Doris debilis Pease, 1871; Doris mariei Crosse, 1875; Doris nigra Stimpson, 1855 (original combination); Doris rubrilineata Pease, 1871; Doris sordida Pease, 1871; Goniodoris montrouzieri Crosse, 1875; Hexabranchus nebulosus Pease, 1860

= Dendrodoris nigra =

Species of gastropod

Dendrodoris nigra is a marine species of sea slug, a dorid nudibranch, shell-less marine gastropod mollusks in the family Dendrodorididae.

== Description ==
Dendrodoris nigra has body lengths up to 7 cm (77 mm) long. Black, sometimes with cream or white spots, the rhinophores with an elongated white knob at the tip. The edge of the mantle is frilly, the rest of the body very soft and slimy. However, this species can have marginal or submarginal red or pink border.

== Habitat ==
This species lives in the Eulittoral zone under rocks and boulders on coral rubble, gravel, algal beds or shelly sand in sheltered bays. They live in Tropical to warm temperate waters.

== Distribution ==
This species lives in regions such as the West Indian Ocean, Red Sea to west Pacific Ocean; tropical Indo-Pacific.
