= Adinopsis =

Scientific classification
- Kingdom: Animalia
- Phylum: Arthropoda
- Clade: Pancrustacea
- Class: Insecta
- Order: Coleoptera
- Suborder: Polyphaga
- Infraorder: Staphyliniformia
- Family: Staphylinidae
- Genus: Adinopsis; Cameron, 1918

Genus of beetles

Adinopsis is a genus of beetles belonging to the family Staphylinidae.

The species of this genus are found in America.

== Species ==
Species:

- Adinopsis africana Cameron, 1950
- Adinopsis angusta (Sharp, 1883)
- Adinopsis australis (Fauvel, 1878)
