= Nerida Wilson =

Australian zoologist

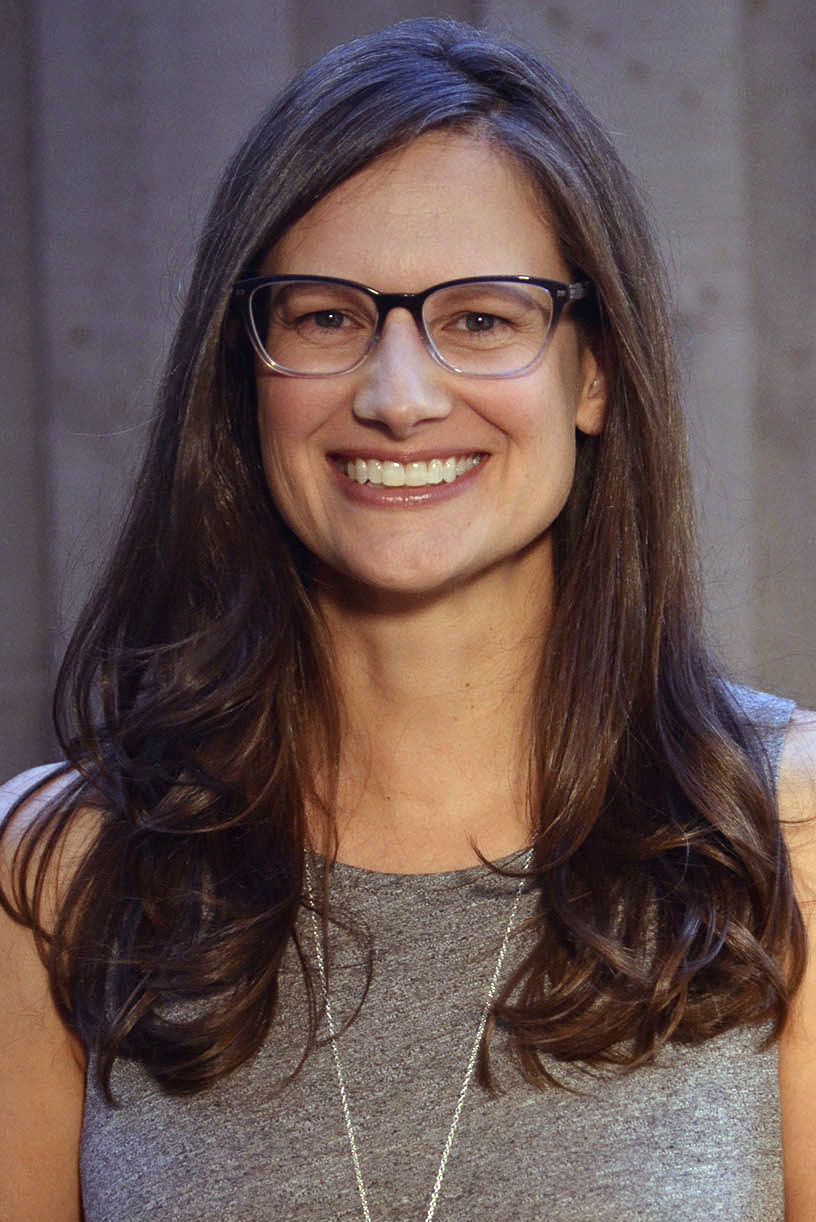
- Nerida Wilson in 2016
- Education: BSc University of Melbourne; PhD University of Queensland
- Awards: Antarctic Service Medal
- Scientific career
- Fields: Invertebrate marine biology
- Workplaces: Commonwealth Scientific and Industrial Research Organisation

Nerida Gaye Wilson is an invertebrate marine molecular biologist at the Commonwealth Scientific and Industrial Research Organisation who has interests in diversity, systematics, phylogeny, phylogeography and behavior. Wilson has been instrumental in demonstrating the level of marine cryptic species complexes in Antarctic waters, testing the circumpolar distribution paradigm with molecular data, and using interdisciplinary approaches to show how Antarctic diversity may have been generated. Her work with NOAA on Antarctic Marine Living Resources has been used to regulate exploratory benthic fisheries.

== Early life and education ==
Wilson grew up on the outskirts of Melbourne in Australia, attending Bayswater Primary School and Bayswater Secondary College. She completed a B.Sc. undergraduate degree at the University of Melbourne in the Faculty of Science (1994–1998) followed by a one-year B.Sc. Honours research degree at University of Queensland (1999) in Zoology. She remained at University of Queensland but moved departments to the Centre for Marine Studies for her PhD (awarded 2004).

== Career and impact ==
Wilson began her career using histology to recover phylogenetically conserved characters, but then utilized molecular data to help understand the evolutionary history of organisms. Wilson spent almost a year as a visiting research fellow at University of Adelaide and South Australian Museum before taking a postdoctoral position in the US at Auburn University (Alabama) from 2005-2006. She then moved to Scripps Institution of Oceanography (San Diego California), first as a postdoc (2007–2009), and then as a project scientist (2009–2010). Wilson returned to Australia in 2010 to take up a research scientist position in the Malacology Section at the Australian Museum (Sydney) and was promoted to senior research scientist in 2012. She then moved to the Western Australian Museum in 2014, where she worked in the Aquatic Zoology Department. In 2017 she became the manager of the Molecular Systematics Unit. In 2023 she joined the Commonwealth Scientific and Industrial Research Organisation. She has adjunct status at Scripps Institution of Oceanography and is a research fellow at the University of Western Australia.

Wilson has participated in numerous deep sea and Antarctic expeditions, using traditional methods and Remotely Operated Vehicles to obtain samples. She dived in the submersible HOV Alvin in 2005, diving on unexplored vents on the Pacific-Antarctic Ridge (>2500m). In 2010, she led the cruise that recovered large numbers of Monoplacophora for molecular and phylogenomic analysis. To date, she has deployed to Antarctica seven times, acting as chief scientist for two of those cruises. She participated on the Denman Marine Voyage to East Antarctica in 2025 on the RSV Nuyina. She is a co-founder and project lead of SeadragonSearch, a citizen science project that monitors wild seadragons. Data from that project was instrumental in listing the Weedy seadragon as Vulnerable on the IUCN Red List. She also helped discover and describe the Ruby seadragon in 2016.

Wilson has been an editor for Invertebrate Systematics journal (2012–2023) and the Journal of Molluscan Studies (2012–2020). She was the president of the Society of Australian Systematic Biologists (2015–2017). She co-authored the proposal for the 2012-2020 SCAR Biology Scientific Research Programme "State of the Antarctic Ecosystem (AntECO)" to promote international interdisciplinary research relevant to Antarctic ecosystems.

Wilson is committed to a fair, equitable scientific community and has run mentoring workshops (2013, 2015) in conjunction with SASB conferences. She co-founded the Women and Minorities in Science group at Scripps Institution of Oceanography (in 2009), and the Equal Opportunity Science- Australia Facebook group (in 2013). She has also worked with Scripps Educational Alliances, the San Diego Project and the CREATE STEM success initiative using Antarctic data sets to create lesson plans to address the Next Generation Science Standards.

== Awards and honors ==
In 2014, Wilson was awarded an Antarctic Service Medal from the United States Antarctic Program. She was also awarded a Women in Technology WA Tech [+] award for her work in technology, research and advocacy. She led an expedition to the Ningaloo Canyons in 2020, which won the Science Engagement Initiative of the Year at the Premier's Science Awards. She has four species named after her; a hydrothermal vent polychaete Mesonerilla neridae, a meiofaunal acochlidian slug Pontohedyle neridae, a myzostomid polychaete Endomyzostoma neridae and a shelled sacoglossan Oxynoe neridae.
