= Nils Hjalmar Odhner =

Swedish malacologist

Nils Hjalmar Odhner (6 December 1884 – 12 June 1973) was a Swedish zoologist who studied mollusks, a malacologist. He was professor of invertebrate zoology at the Swedish Museum of Natural History, Stockholm, and a member of the Royal Swedish Academy of Sciences.

He was the father of ambassador Bengt Odhner (1918–1990).

== Taxa ==
Species named in honor of this malacologist include:

- The white-knight nudibranch Doris odhneri (MacFarland, 1966)
- Tritonia nilsodhneri Marcus, 1983
- Bulimulus sp. nov. 'nilsodhneri'

The World Register of Marine Species (WoRMS) lists 490 marine species named by Odhner. Many of these have become synonyms.
