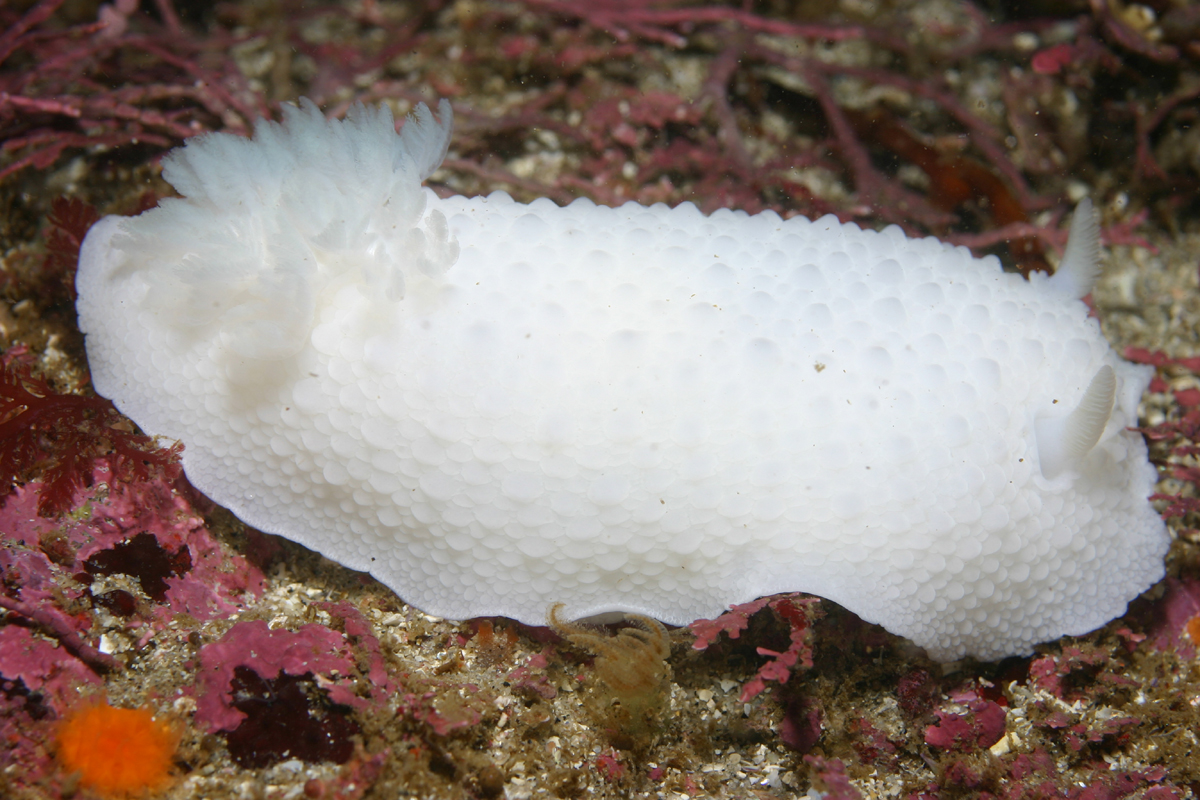
- A live individual of Doris odhneri, head end towards the right
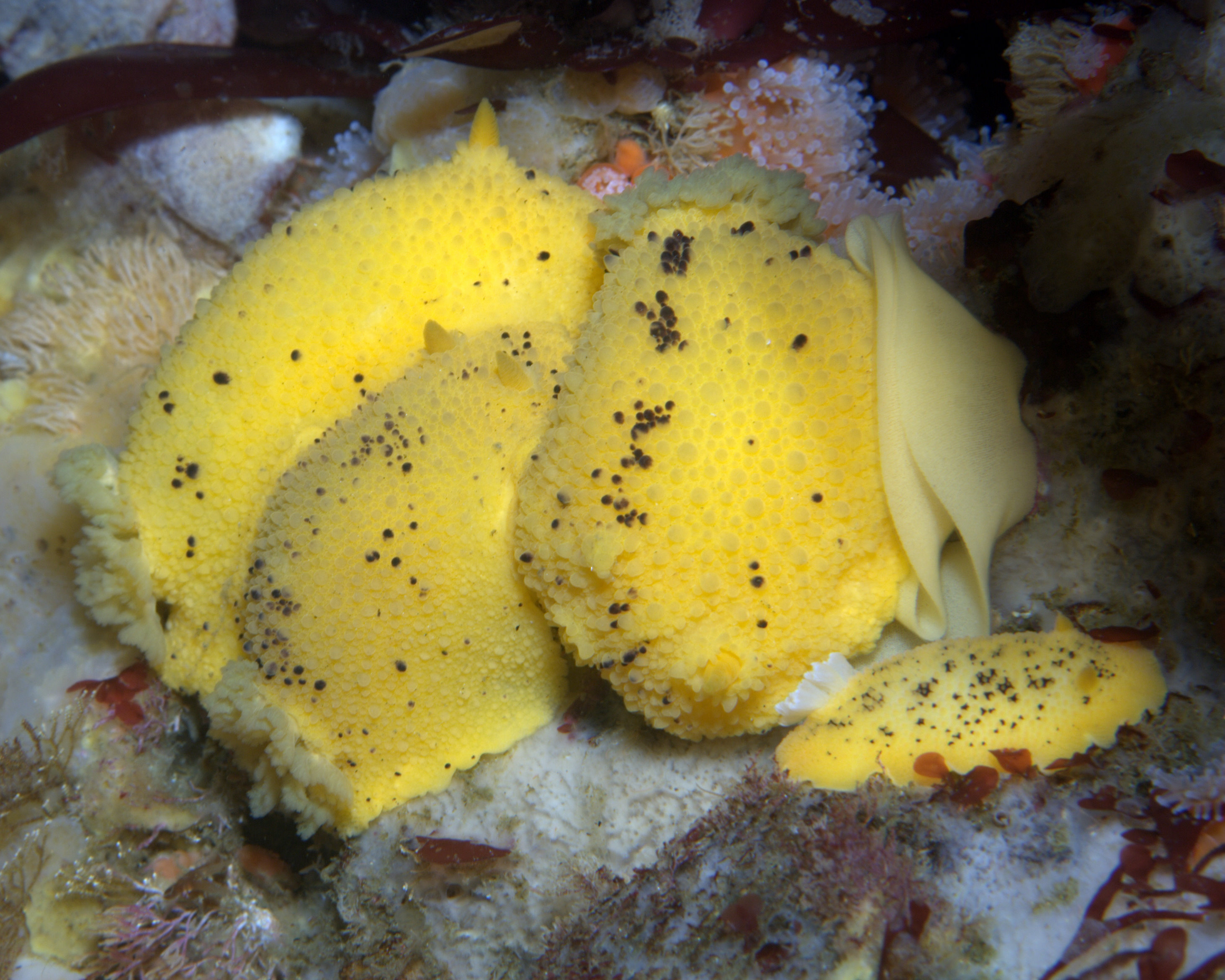
- Mating Doris montereyensis

Scientific classification
- Kingdom: Animalia
- Phylum: Mollusca
- Class: Gastropoda
- Order: Nudibranchia
- Superfamily: Doridoidea
- Family: Dorididae; Rafinesque, 1815

Genera
- See text

Synonyms
- Glossodorididae Thiele, 1929

= Dorididae =

Sea lemon

Family of gastropods

Sea lemon is a loosely applied common name for a group of medium-sized to large shell-less colorful sea slugs or nudibranchs, specifically dorid nudibranchs in the taxonomic family Dorididae and other closely related families. These are marine gastropod mollusks.

The Monterey sea lemon is Doris montereyensis and the mottled pale sea lemon is Diaulula lentiginosa.

The common name sea lemon probably comes from these animal's visual similarity to a lemon based on such qualities as the roughened skin, the oval form when seen from above, and the common but not inevitable orange to pale yellow coloration.

== Description ==
These dorid nudibranchs can be large (up to 20 cm), rather flattened, and oval in shape when seen from above. They have two hornlike projections (rhinophores) on the head, and a rosette-like tuft of gills on the back of the animal. The mantle is sometimes sprinkled with black dots, and it is covered in small bumps, which are called tubercles.

== Life habits ==
Sea lemons feed on sponges. They lay ribbons of white or yellow eggs. Taxonomically the Dorididae is a family of several genera, the dorids named after the mythological ancient Greek sea nymph Doris. (See Ovidius, Metamorphoses 2.6)

== Genera ==
Genera within the family Dorididae include:

- Aphelodoris (Bergh, 1879)
- Artachaea Bergh, 1881
- Conualevia Collier & Farmer, 1964
- Doriopsis Bergh, 1889
- Doris Linnaeus, 1758
- Goslineria Valdés, 2001
- Homoiodoris Bergh, 1881: nomen dubium
- Pharodoris Valdés, 2001

Genera brought into synonymy

- Anisodoris Bergh, 1898 : synonym of Diaulula (Discodorididae)
- Anoplodoris P. Fischer, 1883 : synonym of Doris Linnaeus, 1758
- Aporodoris Ihering, 1886 [synonym of Taringa in family Discodorididae]
- Archidoris Bergh, 1878 : synonym of Doris Linnaeus, 1758
- Austrodoris Odhner, 1926 : synonym of Doris Linnaeus, 1758
- Ctenodoris Eliot, 1907 : synonym of Doris Linnaeus, 1758
- Doridigitata d'Orbigny, 1839: synonym of Doris Linnaeus, 1758
- Doriopsis Bergh, 1889: synonym of Doris Linnaeus, 1758
- Doriorbis Kay & Young, 1969 :synonym of Doris Linnaeus, 1758
- Etidoris Ihering, 1886 a: synonym of Thordisa Bergh, 1877
- Guyonia Risbec, 1928 :synonym of Doris Linnaeus, 1758
- Neodoris Baba, 1938 : synonym of Doris Linnaeus, 1758
- Praegliscita Burn, 1957 : synonym of Doris Linnaeus, 1758
- Rhabdochila P. Fischer, 1883: synonym of Rostanga Bergh, 1879
- Siraius Marcus, 1955 : synonym of Doris Linnaeus, 1758
- Staurodoris Bergh, 1878: synonym of Doris Linnaeus, 1758
