= Bermudella pellucida =

Scientific classification
- Kingdom: Animalia
- Phylum: Mollusca
- Class: Gastropoda
- Order: Nudibranchia
- Family: Goniodorididae
- Subfamily: Goniodoridinae
- Genus: Bermudella
- Species: B. pellucida

Binomial name
- Bermudella pellucida (Burn, 1967)

Synonyms
- Okenia pellucida Burn, 1967

Species of gastropod

Bermudella pellucida is a species of sea slug, specifically a dorid nudibranch, a marine gastropod mollusc in the subfamily Goniodoridinae in the family Goniodorididae.

== Distribution ==
This species was described from south-eastern Australia. It is known from the United Arab Emirates, India, Malaysia, New Zealand, Palmyra Atoll and Japan.

== Description ==
This Bermudella has a narrow body and eleven or twelve pairs of short lateral papillae. There are a few papillae on the back, between the rhinophores and the gills. The body is translucent and covered with a reticulate pattern of brown lines. It is similar in shape and arrangement of the papillae to Bermudella angelensis, Bermudella zoobotryon and Bermudella distincta.

== Ecology ==
The diet of this species is a bryozoan, Amathia verticillata which is a common fouling organism which is transported on ships' hulls.
