= Amathia vidovici =

Scientific classification
- Domain: Eukaryota
- Kingdom: Animalia
- Phylum: Bryozoa
- Class: Gymnolaemata
- Order: Ctenostomatida
- Family: Vesiculariidae
- Genus: Amathia
- Species: A. vidovici

Binomial name
- Amathia vidovici (Heller, 1867)

Species of moss animal

Amathia vidovici is a species of colonial bryozoans with a tree-like structure. It is found in shallow waters over a wide geographical range, being found in both the Atlantic and Pacific Oceans and adjoining seas.

== Description ==
Colonies of Amathia vidovici are like miniature trees and consist of a branching mass of individual zooids connected to each other by stolons. The zooids are in groups of four to eight pairs spiralling round the stolon. The colony is stiffened by an exoskeleton made of chitin which is secreted by the epidermis of the zooids. The stolon has a jointed appearance and consists of a series of specialised tubular zooids. The stolons are 0.13 to 0.20 mm (0.005 to 0.008 in) in diameter and the zooids are 0.4 mm (0.02 in) long. Zooids within the colony are connected via pores in the interconnecting walls and coelomic fluid can be transferred between them and through the stolon.

== Distribution ==
Amathia vidovici has a cosmopolitan distribution and is found in shallow waters in both the eastern and western Atlantic Ocean, the Mediterranean Sea, the Caribbean Sea, the Pacific and Indian Oceans.

== Biology ==
Amathia vidovici feeds on bacteria, diatoms and phytoplankton by sifting particles from the surrounding water with its lophophore.

Amathia vidovici is a hermaphrodite and different zooids on the same colony may be male or female, depending on their stage of development. The embryology of Amathia vidovici has not been studied but most bryozoans produce large, yolky eggs which are retained in the body cavity. Sperm is shed into the water and some self-fertilisation probably takes place within the colony. The larvae are brooded initially and later released into the sea when they are well enough developed. They soon settle on the seabed, turn themselves inside out and cement themselves in place before undergoing metamorphosis. Each colony is entirely formed by the asexual reproduction of this founding zooid and subsequent clonal budding. Different zooids in the colony have different specialised functions.

== Ecology ==
Amathia vidovici is typically found growing on rocks, seagrass, seaweed, mangrove roots, oysters, mussels, man-made structures and debris. It is sometimes associated with the honeysuckle tunicate (Perophora viridis), the stolons of which intertwine with the branches of the bryozoan. The colonies provide shelter for juvenile fish and for the copepods, amphipods, polychaete worms and other small invertebrates on which they feed.
