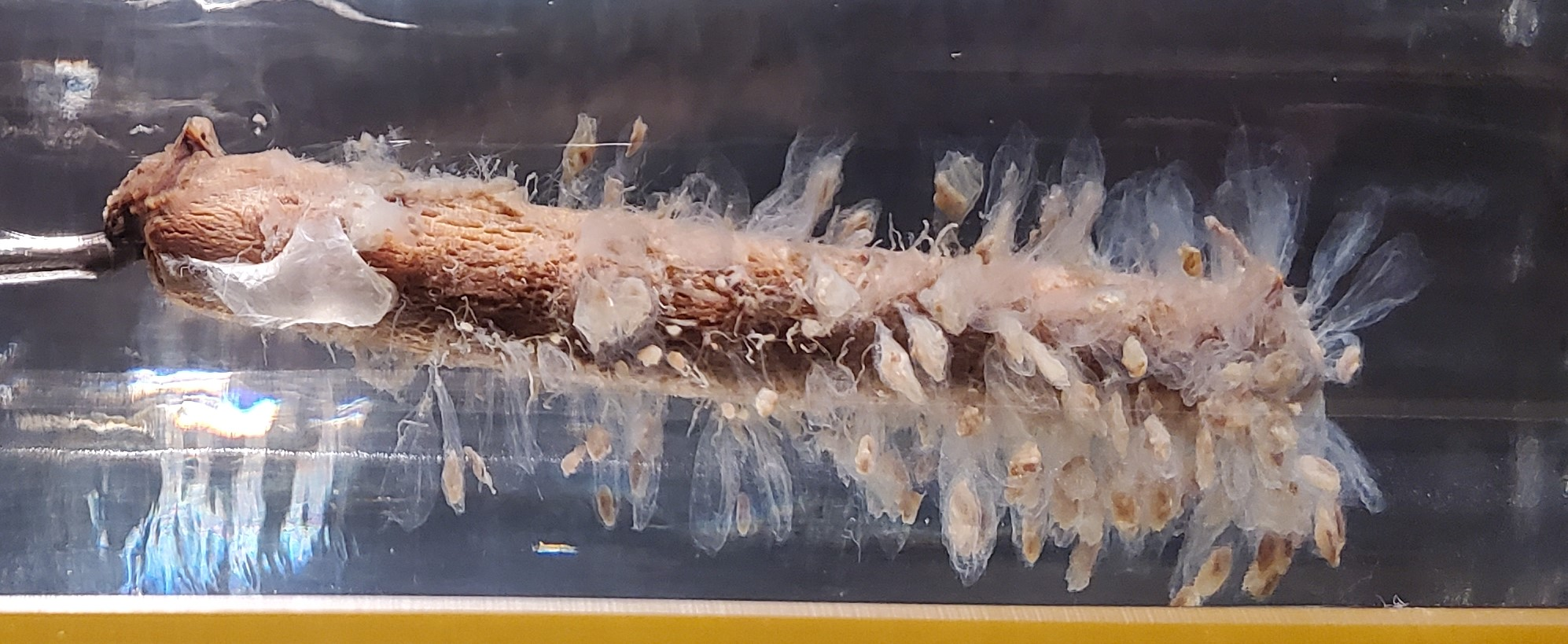
- Preserved specimen

Scientific classification
- Domain: Eukaryota
- Kingdom: Animalia
- Phylum: Chordata
- Subphylum: Tunicata
- Class: Ascidiacea
- Order: Phlebobranchia
- Family: Perophoridae
- Genus: Perophora
- Species: P. regina

Binomial name
- Perophora regina Goodbody & Cole, 1987

= Perophora regina =

Species of sea squirt

Perophora regina is a species of colonial sea squirt in the genus Perophora. It is native to the tropical western Atlantic Ocean where it is found growing on mangrove roots on the Belize Barrier Reef.

== Description ==
A colony of Perophora regina consists of a mat of slender, branching stolons, with short-stalked zooids growing at intervals. The zooids are so crowded together in mature colonies that the surface of the colony appears smooth. The zooids are 4 to 6 mm (0.16 to 0.24 in) long and on each there is a yellow neural gland between the siphons with a distinctive white spot on either side of this. Like Perophora viridis, the zooids have four rows of stigmata and the muscles in the mantle wall are predominantly longitudinal. This tunicate broods its embryos in a pouch at the lower right side of the atrium.

== Distribution and habitat ==
Perophora regina is found in scattered locations on the Belize Barrier Reef where it is found growing profusely on mangrove roots in fast moving water. It is particularly common on the free ends of dangling Rhizophora roots where it may completely cover lengths of 20 cm (8 in) at the tip. It sometimes grows loosely over the surface of sponges such as Haliclona. It does not seem to be tolerant of wide variations in salinity and temperature.
