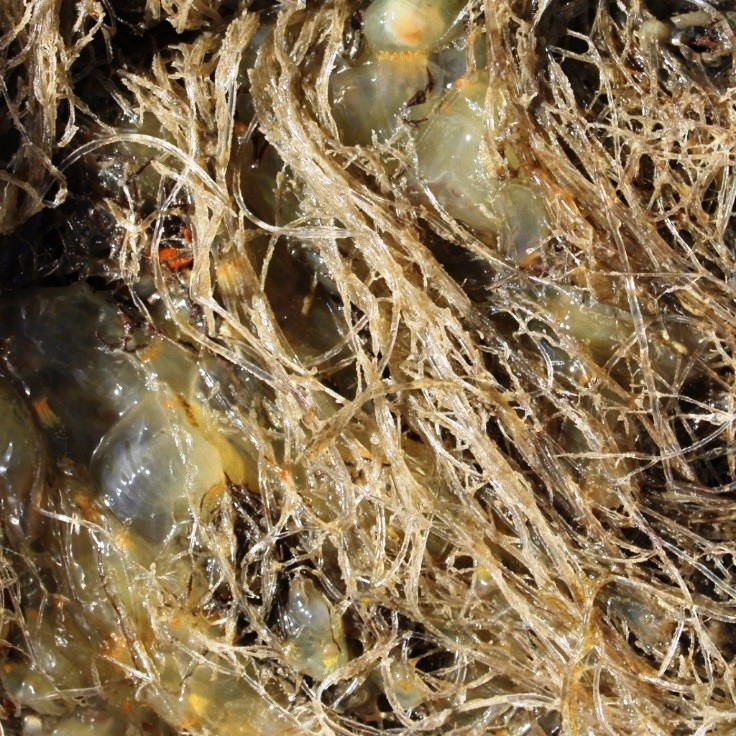

Scientific classification
- Kingdom: Animalia
- Phylum: Bryozoa
- Class: Gymnolaemata
- Order: Ctenostomatida
- Family: Vesiculariidae
- Genus: Amathia
- Species: A. verticillata

Binomial name
- Amathia verticillata (Delle Chiaje, 1822)

Synonyms
- Hyalosiphonia verticillatus (Delle Chiaje, 1822); Hydra verticillata Delle Chiaje, 1822; Serialaria coutinhii Muller, 1860; Zoobotryon pellucidus Ehrenberg, 1829; Zoobotryon verticillatum (Delle Chiaje, 1822)

= Amathia verticillata =

Species of moss animal

Amathia verticillata, commonly known as the spaghetti bryozoan, is a species of colonial bryozoans with a bush-like structure. It is found in shallow temperate and warm waters in the western Atlantic Ocean and the Caribbean Sea and has spread worldwide as a fouling organism. It is regarded as an invasive species in some countries.

== Description ==
Colonies of Amathia verticillata resemble miniature trees up to a metre (yard) wide and consist of a dense mass of feeding zooids known as autozooids connected to each other by slender branching stolons 0.5 mm (0.02 in) in diameter. The stolons are attached to the substrate by an adhesive disc and are translucent and may be brownish or bluish. The autozooids are in two rows along the stolons, each zooid being sac-like and 0.4 to 0.6 mm (0.016 to 0.024 in) in length. The mouth of each autozooid bears a retractable crown-like feeding structure known as a lophophore, with eight short tentacles. The stolon has a jointed appearance and is composed of a series of tubular non-feeding heterozooids. All the zooids within the colony are connected via pores in their walls and coelomic fluid can be transferred along the stolon and between adjacent autozooids.

== Distribution and habitat ==
Colonies of Amathia verticillata are found in shallow water in the tropical and subtropical western Atlantic and the Caribbean Sea and many other parts of the world. It is tolerant of a range of water conditions but grows best at salinities of at least 30ppt and water temperatures over 22 °C (72 °F). It is a common species in the Indian River Lagoon where it grows vigorously from April to September but dies back during winter. Amathia verticillata is a fouling organism and its typical habitat is growing on the blades of seagrasses, the thallus of large seaweeds, the roots of mangroves, rocky reefs, the shells of bivalve molluscs, piers, breakwaters and other man-made structures, the hulls of boats, floating masses of seaweed and other floating debris.

== Biology ==
Each autozooid feeds by expanding its lophophore, the extended tentacles of which filter phytoplankton from the water. It has been estimated that each zooid can process 8.8 ml of water in a day, and the zooids on a square metre of seagrass meadow can filter some 184,728 litres (48,613 gallons) of water a day. By this means, this bryozoan can play a useful role in improving water quality.

Expansion of the colony is by budding and new colonies can also be formed by fragmentation. It has been shown that one end of a cut piece of stolon will develop attachment structures to anchor it to the substrate within about twenty-four hours. This bryozoan is a hermaphrodite and reproduction also takes place sexually. The larva is planktonic, settles on a hard surface and develops into a heterozooid which attaches itself to the substrate with an adhesive disc.

== Ecology ==
Amathia verticillata sometimes grows in association with the honeysuckle tunicate (Perophora viridis), the stolons of which intertwine with those of the bryozoan. The colonies provide hiding places for juvenile fish and for the amphipods, copepods, polychaete worms and the other small invertebrates on which the young fish feed.

The tissues of Amathia verticillata contain certain secondary metabolites that render it unappetizing to many potential predators. The main one is a bromo-alkaloid which has been shown to prevent settlement of mussel and barnacle larvae on the colony. One of the few creatures that does feed on it is the nudibranch Okenia zoobotryon which is thought to live, feed and lay its eggs almost exclusively on the bryozoan and whose tissues may then contain many of the same anti-predator chemicals.

== Invasive species ==
There are concerns about Amathia verticillata as an invasive species. It can develop into huge aggregations and cause fouling of fishing gear, block sea-water inlets, out-compete native species and upset food chains by filtering phytoplankton from the water.
