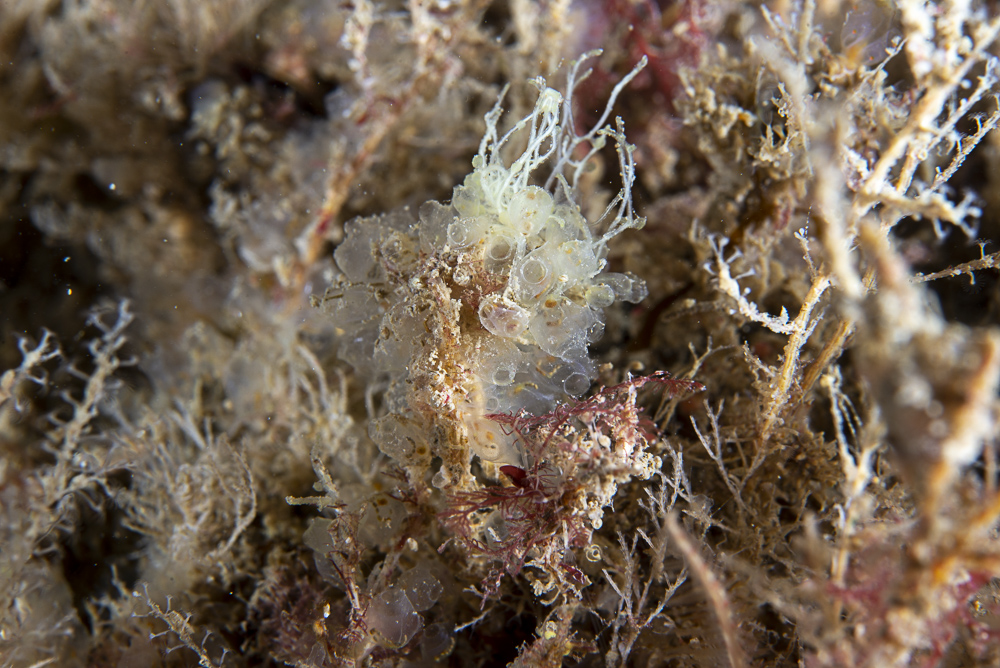
- Strangford Lough, Northern Ireland

Scientific classification
- Domain: Eukaryota
- Kingdom: Animalia
- Phylum: Chordata
- Subphylum: Tunicata
- Class: Ascidiacea
- Order: Phlebobranchia
- Family: Perophoridae
- Genus: Perophora
- Species: P. listeri

Binomial name
- Perophora listeri Wiegman, 1835

= Perophora listeri =

Species of sea squirt

Perophora listeri is a species of colonial sea squirt in the genus Perophora, native to the North Atlantic.

== Description ==
Perophora japonica is a colonial tunicate with small, rounded, translucent zooids connected by a network of stolons.
