= Perophora multiclathrata =

Scientific classification
- Domain: Eukaryota
- Kingdom: Animalia
- Phylum: Chordata
- Subphylum: Tunicata
- Class: Ascidiacea
- Order: Phlebobranchia
- Family: Perophoridae
- Genus: Perophora
- Species: P. multiclathrata

Binomial name
- Perophora multiclathrata (Sluiter, 1904)

Synonyms
- Ecteinascidia euphues Sluiter, 1904; Ecteinascidia multiclathrata Sluiter, 1904; Ecteinascidia formosana Oka, 1931; Perophora africana Millar, 1953; Perophora formosana Tokioka, 1953; Perophora orientalis Arnback-Christie-Linde, 1935

Species of sea squirt

Perophora multiclathrata is a species of colonial sea squirt in the genus Perophora. It is native to the tropical Indo-Pacific and the western Atlantic Ocean.

== Description ==
A colony of Perophora multiclathrata consists of slender, branching stolons, with unstalked zooids growing at intervals. Each zooid is 2 to 3 mm (0.08 to 0.12 in) long and has about twenty tentacles surrounding the buccal siphon, alternately long and short. The pharynx has five rows of stigmata, some of which extend from the first row into the second. The musculature in the atrial wall is distinctive with horizontal and radial elements and a circular muscle fibre surrounding the base of the atrial siphon allowing the atrium to become pouched and the atrial siphon to be pulled inward.

== Distribution and habitat ==
Perophora multiclathrata has a widespread distribution in both the tropical Indo-Pacific region and the tropical western Atlantic Ocean. In the Caribbean Sea it is found in small colonies under stones on back reef flats, and in sheltered mangrove lagoons. In East Timor, from where the type specimen came, it is often found on sheltered reefs where there is little water movement.
