= Perophora viridis =

Scientific classification
- Domain: Eukaryota
- Kingdom: Animalia
- Phylum: Chordata
- Subphylum: Tunicata
- Class: Ascidiacea
- Order: Phlebobranchia
- Family: Perophoridae
- Genus: Perophora
- Species: P. viridis

Binomial name
- Perophora viridis Verrill, 1871

Species of sea squirt

Perophora viridis, the honeysuckle tunicate, is a species of colonial sea squirt in the genus Perophora found in the tropical western Atlantic Ocean.

== Description ==
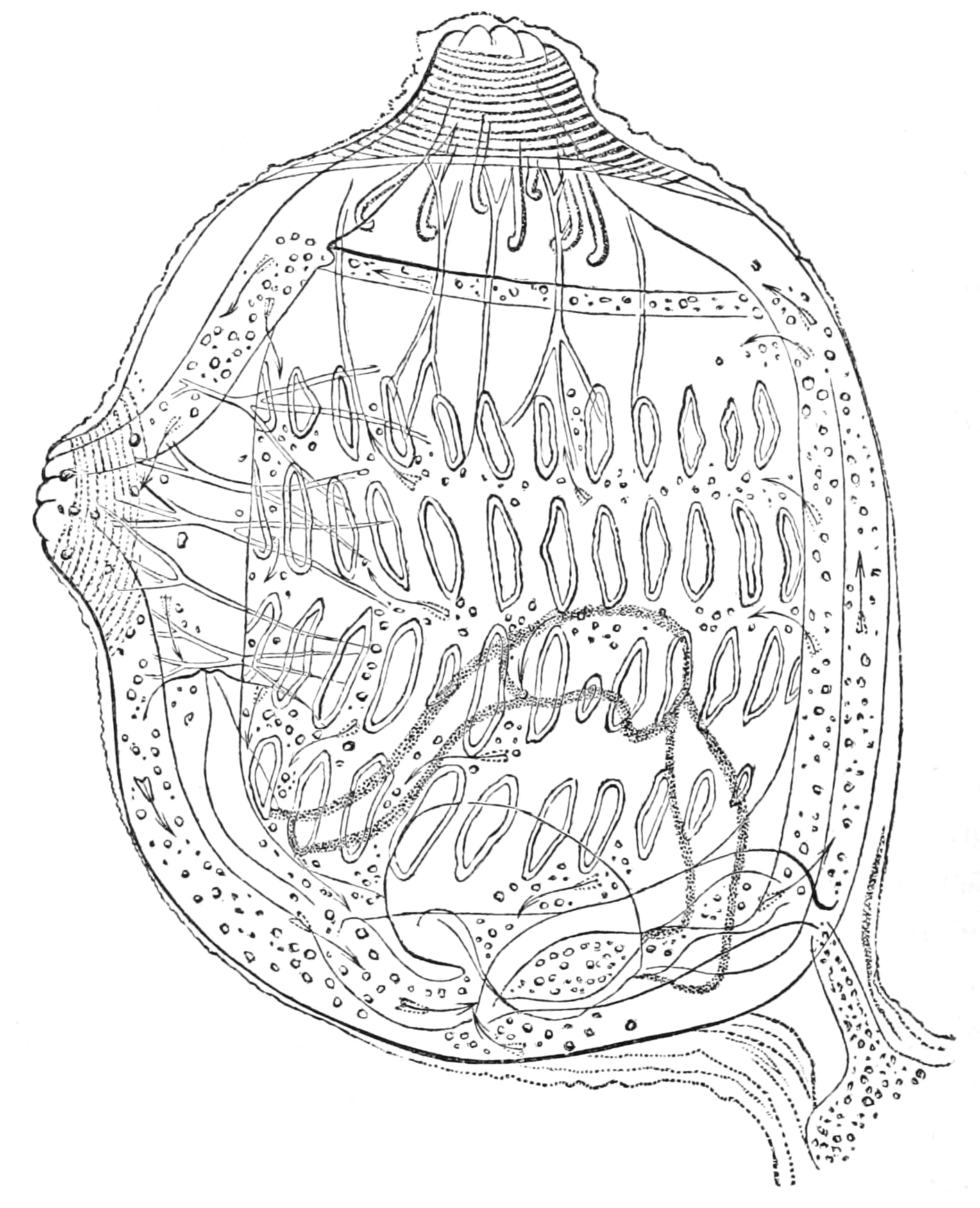
Illustration of Perophora drawn by Philip Henry Gosse

Perophora viridis is a colonial sea squirt with the individual zooids united by a stolon or stem but spaced widely apart. The stolon meanders along the surface of the substrate forming a mat. The base of each zooid is attached to the stolon and its body resembles a small barrel, with an opening at the top and another at the side, each opening raised on a rim. These are the buccal siphon through which water flows into the body of the animal and the atrial siphon through which it is expelled. A large pharynx occupies much of the interior and the surrounding muscular body wall is known as the mantle. The pharynx opens into a horizontally aligned gut which loops around to terminate near the atrial siphon. There are four bands of "stigmata" on the inside of the mantle, a fact that this species has in common with Perophora regina but which distinguishes it from several other western Atlantic members of the genus Perophora which have five bands.

The outer surface of the zooid is known as a tunic and is gelatinous and translucent. It is colourless but the animal appears green because of the blood corpuscles circulating in blood vessels within the mantle. The arrangement of muscles in the mantle is important for distinguishing Perophora viridis from other species. These muscles are limited to about twelve muscles running longitudinally from the siphonal plate, a slightly depressed area between the siphons. The muscles extend for about a quarter of the length of the zooid and their function is to enable the animal to contract and protect its siphons. The only other musculature is the circular sphincter muscles which control the size of the siphons.

The siphons each have six or more pointed lobes and the opening into the pharynx is surrounded by ten large and ten small tentacles, designed to prevent the entry of particle too large for the animal to cope with. The pharynx occupies most of the body cavity and is surrounded by a water-filled atrium. This is criss-crossed by various mesenteries which provide support for the pharynx and the rest of the gut.

== Distribution and habitat ==
Perophora viridis is found in the tropical western Atlantic Ocean, the Caribbean Sea and the Gulf of Mexico. In the Caribbean it is plentiful in nutrient-rich lagoons where the creeping stolon spreads like a vine across the seabed, over seaweed and oysters and around mangrove roots. It often grows intertwined with the tree-like bryozoan Amathia vidovici and less often with another bryozoan, Amathia verticillata. The stolons of tunicate and bryozoan run parallel with and round each other, making the whole resemble a single organism.

== Biology ==
Perophora viridis is a filter feeder. It draws water in through the buccal siphon and food particles such as bacteria and zooplankton get trapped in a mucus net that lines the pharynx. This gets rolled up and moved along by cilia and passes into the gut where digestion takes place. The anus is near the atrial siphon and waste products get swept out with the exhalent water.

== Research ==
Perophora viridis has a simple pattern of growth and relatively unspecialised cells. It has been found that the tip of a stolon, or a section of stolon with or without zooids, can regenerate when severed from the parent organism. New buds can develop within two days at either or both cut ends of a section of stolon, or occasionally in the middle. Even undifferentiated material extracted from the tunic is capable of regeneration.
