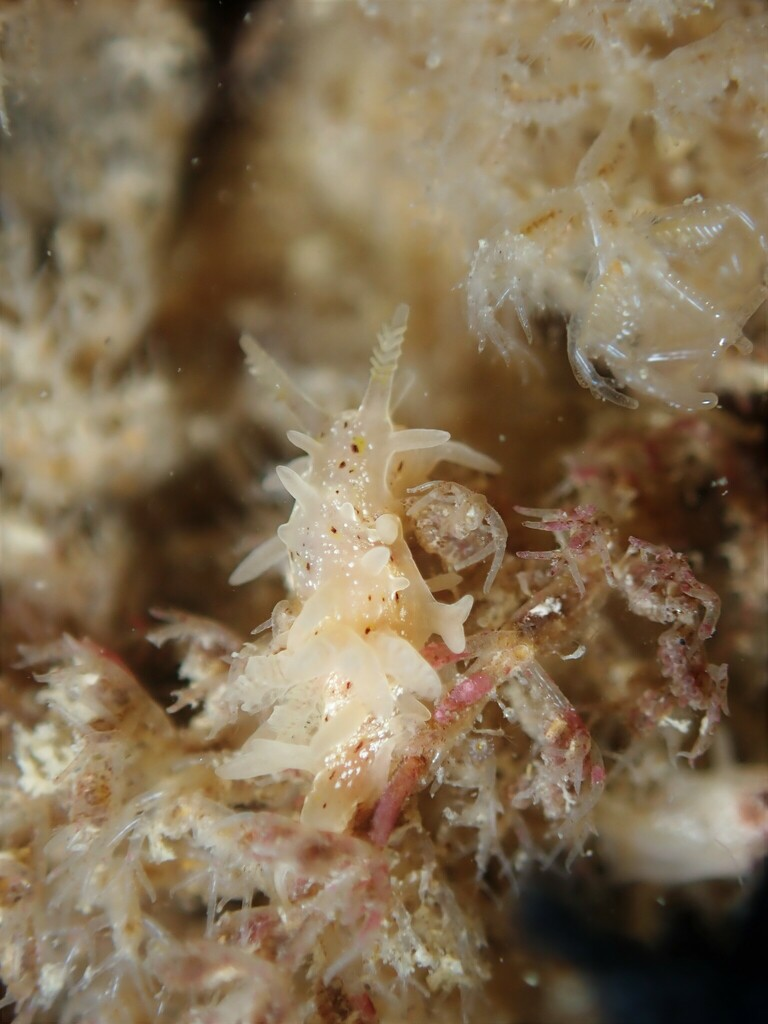

Scientific classification
- Kingdom: Animalia
- Phylum: Mollusca
- Class: Gastropoda
- Order: Nudibranchia
- Family: Goniodorididae
- Subfamily: Goniodoridinae
- Genus: Bermudella
- Species: B. mija

Binomial name
- Bermudella mija (Burn, 1967)

Synonyms
- Okenia mija Burn, 1967

= Bermudella mija =

Species of gastropod

Bermudella mija is a species of sea slug, specifically a dorid nudibranch, a marine gastropod mollusc in the subfamily Goniodoridinae in the family Goniodorididae.

== Distribution ==
This species was described from south-eastern Australia. It is known from New South Wales, Victoria and Tasmania.

== Description ==
This Bermudella has a narrow body and seven pairs of short lateral papillae. There are many papillae on the back, between the rhinophores and the gills and some on the sides of the body. The body is translucent and has some small spots of brown and white pigment. It is similar in shape and arrangement of the papillae to Bermudella angelensis, Bermudella zoobotryon, Bermudella harastii and Bermudella distincta.

== Ecology ==
The diet of this species is a bryozoan, Amathia wilsoni.
