= Perophora japonica =

Scientific classification
- Domain: Eukaryota
- Kingdom: Animalia
- Phylum: Chordata
- Subphylum: Tunicata
- Class: Ascidiacea
- Order: Phlebobranchia
- Family: Perophoridae
- Genus: Perophora
- Species: P. japonica

Binomial name
- Perophora japonica Oka, 1927

Species of sea squirt

Perophora japonica is a species of colonial sea squirt in the genus Perophora, native to the North Indo-Pacific. It has spread to several other parts of the world including the south coast of Britain, France, the Netherlands and the west coast of the United States.

== Description ==
Perophora japonica is a colonial tunicate with a network of slender branching stolon on which small, rounded, translucent zooids some 4 mm (0.16 in) long occur at intervals. Younger regions of the colony are yellowish-green and the growing tips of the stolons may have star-shaped, bright yellow terminal zooids. These zooids are easily detached and can break off, float away and found new colonies.

== Distribution and habitat ==
Perophora japonica is native to Japan, Korea and Peter the Great Gulf in Russia. but has spread to other parts of the world. In 1999 it was first seen off the coasts of the United Kingdom near Plymouth where it was growing on hydroids, brown seaweed and on panels of material placed in the sea to investigate the settling of marine larvae. Two years later it was reported eighty miles further east in the Fleet, Dorset and in another two years it was present in Guernsey. It appeared in waters off the Netherlands and France at much the same date and here it was growing on Sargassum muticum, species of Fucus and Laminaria, sponges, solitary tunicates, shellfish and directly on the underside of pontoons. On the western coast of North America it has been found in Humboldt Bay and San Diego Bay, California. It is probable that it was dispersed as a fouling organism on the hull of ships or accidentally as a result of aquacultural operations.
