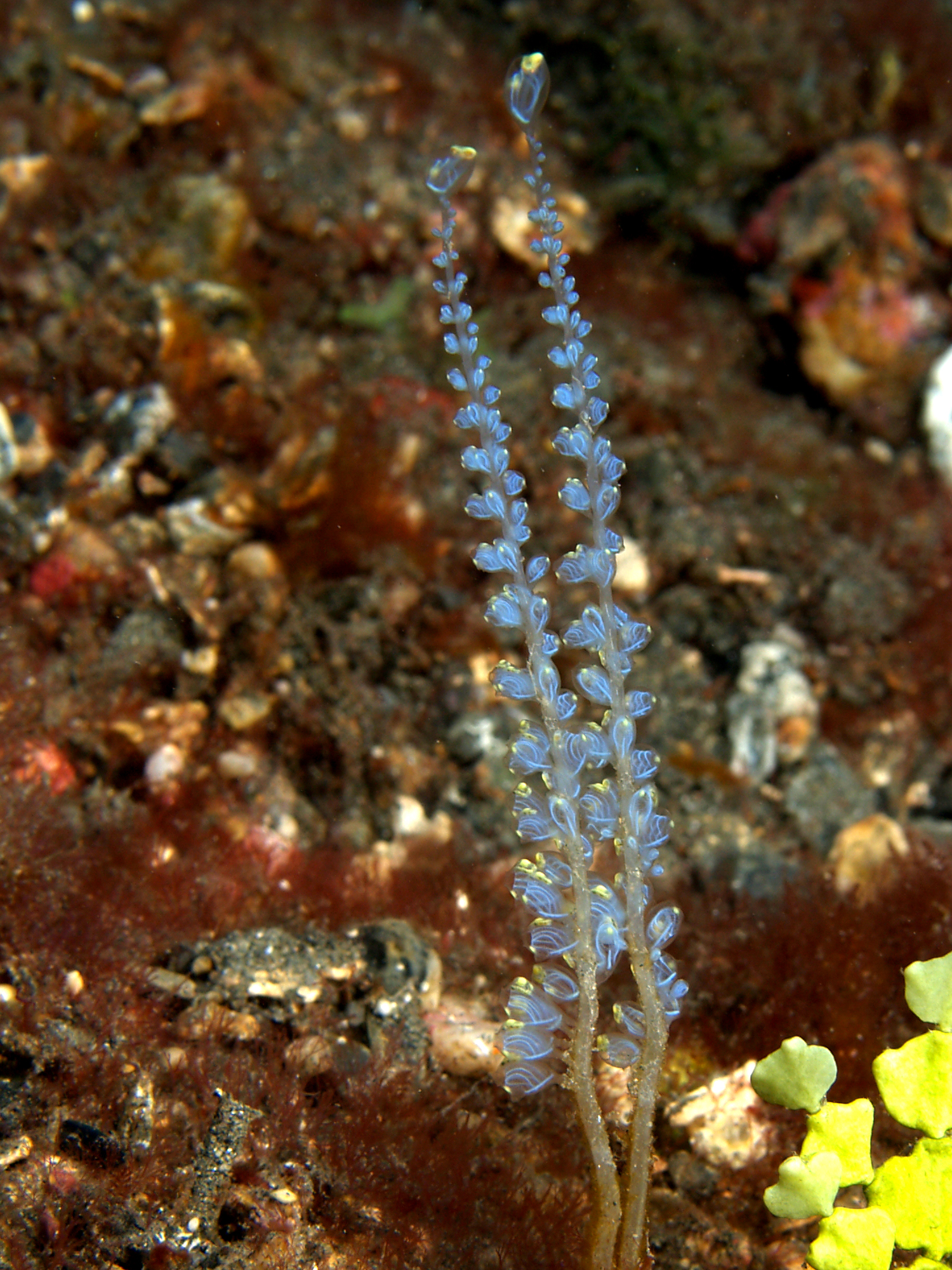
- Perophora namei

Scientific classification
- Domain: Eukaryota
- Kingdom: Animalia
- Phylum: Chordata
- Subphylum: Tunicata
- Class: Ascidiacea
- Order: Phlebobranchia
- Family: Perophoridae
- Genus: Perophora; Wiegmann, 1835

Synonyms
- Tibiania

= Perophora =

Genus of sea squirts

Perophora is a sea squirt genus in the family Perophoridae. Most species are found in shallow warm water but a few are found in higher latitudes. A colony consists of a number of zooids which bud off from a long slender stolon.

== Characteristics ==
A Perophora colony consists of a system of stolons from which individual zooids arise at intervals. Each zooid has four or five rows of stigmata in the wall of the atrium, the one exception being Perophora multistigmata which has eight rows. In some cases, the five-rowed species have some stigmata extending over the first and second rows indicating that the primary number of rows is four. In Ecteinascidia, the only other genus in the family, there are always eight or more rows of stigmata, usually twelve to twenty rows. Other distinguishing characteristics are that Perophora has a horizontal gut loop with a short rectum and a testis with usually one, but up to four lobes, situated in the gut loop. In Ecteinascidia the gut loop is curved, the rectum long and the testis multi-lobed.

== Species ==
The World Register of Marine Species lists the following species:

- Perophora annectens Ritter, 1893
- Perophora bermudensis Berrill, 1932
- Perophora carpenteria Goodbody, 1994
- Perophora clavata Kott, 1985
- Perophora euphues (Sluiter, 1895)
- Perophora hornelli Herdman, 1906
- Perophora hutchisoni Macdonald, 1859
- Perophora jacerens (Tokioka, 1954)
- Perophora japonica Oka, 1927
- Perophora listeri Wiegman, 1835
- Perophora longicaulis Kott, 2003
- Perophora modificata Kott, 1985
- Perophora multiclathrata (Sluiter, 1904)
- Perophora multistigmata Kott, 1952
- Perophora namei Hartmeyer & Michaelsen, 1928
- Perophora psammodes (Sluiter, 1895)
- Perophora regina Goodbody & Cole, 1987
- Perophora sabulosa Kott, 1990
- Perophora sagamiensis Tokioka, 1953
- Perophora tokarae
- Perophora virgulata Monniot, 1997
- Perophora viridis Verrill, 1871

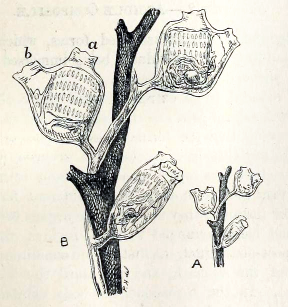
Perophora listeri; A. slightly magnified; B. further magnified; ascidiozooids in right, left and lateral aspects a. branchial siphon b. atrial siphon
