= Bermudella harastii =

Scientific classification
- Kingdom: Animalia
- Phylum: Mollusca
- Class: Gastropoda
- Order: Nudibranchia
- Family: Goniodorididae
- Subfamily: Goniodoridinae
- Genus: Bermudella
- Species: B. harastii

Binomial name
- Bermudella harastii (Pola, Roldán & Padilla, 2014)

Synonyms
- Okenia harastii Pola, Roldán & Padilla, 2014

Species of gastropod

Bermudella harastii is a species of sea slug, specifically a dorid nudibranch, a marine gastropod mollusc in the subfamily Goniodoridinae in the family Goniodorididae.

== Distribution ==
This species was described from New South Wales, Australia.

== Description ==
This Bermudella has six pairs of lateral papillae and two to four papillae on the back, in front of the gills. The back is translucent brown in colour, with scattered dark brown spots. It is similar in shape and arrangement of the papillae to Bermudella angelensis, Bermudella distincta, Bermudella zoobotryon and Bermudella mija.

== Ecology ==
The diet of this species is a bryozoan.
