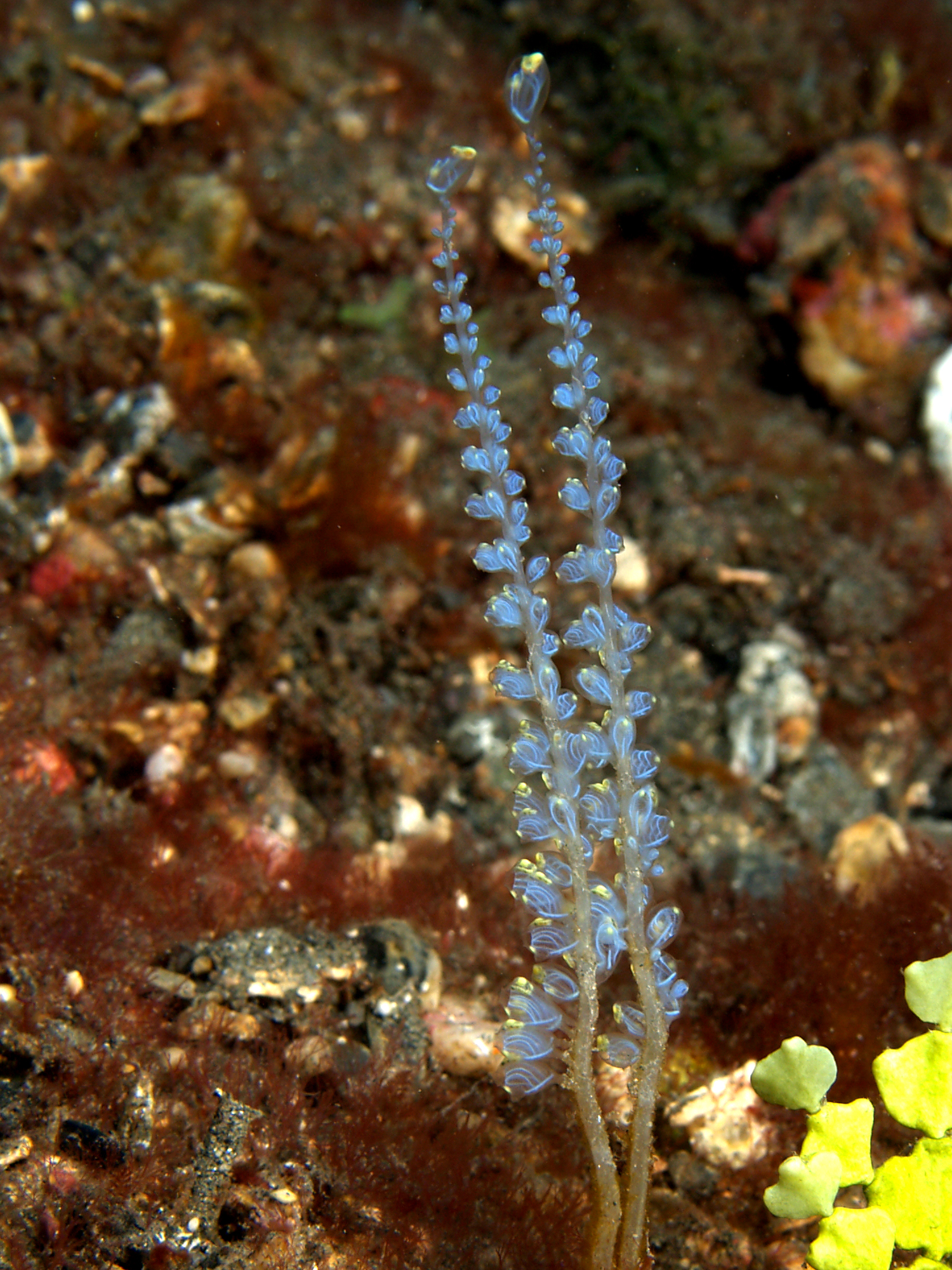

Scientific classification
- Kingdom: Animalia
- Phylum: Chordata
- Subphylum: Tunicata
- Class: Ascidiacea
- Order: Phlebobranchia
- Family: Perophoridae
- Genus: Perophora
- Species: P. namei

Binomial name
- Perophora namei Hartmeyer & Michaelsen, 1928

= Perophora namei =

Species of sea squirt

Perophora namei is a sea squirt species in the genus Perophora found in Central Indo-Pacific.

Perophora namei produces the alkaloid perophoramidine.
