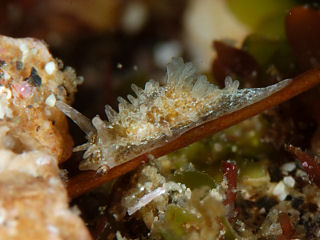

Scientific classification
- Kingdom: Animalia
- Phylum: Mollusca
- Class: Gastropoda
- Order: Nudibranchia
- Family: Goniodorididae
- Subfamily: Goniodoridinae
- Genus: Bermudella
- Species: B. distincta

Binomial name
- Bermudella distincta (Baba, 1940)

Synonyms
- Okenia distincta Baba, 1940

= Bermudella distincta =

Species of gastropod

Bermudella distincta is a species of sea slug, specifically a dorid nudibranch, a marine gastropod mollusc in the subfamily Goniodoridinae in the family Goniodorididae.

== Distribution ==
This species was described from northern Honshu, Japan. It is known from northern Japan north to Peter the Great Bay, Russia.

== Description ==
This Bermudella has a narrow body and up to ten pairs of short lateral papillae. There are many papillae on the back, between the rhinophores and the gills and two in front of the rhinophores. The body is translucent and has some small spots of brown and white pigment. It is similar in shape and arrangement of the papillae to Bermudella angelensis, Bermudella harastii, Bermudella zoobotryon and Bermudella mija.

== Ecology ==
The diet of this species is a bryozoan, a species of Amathia.
