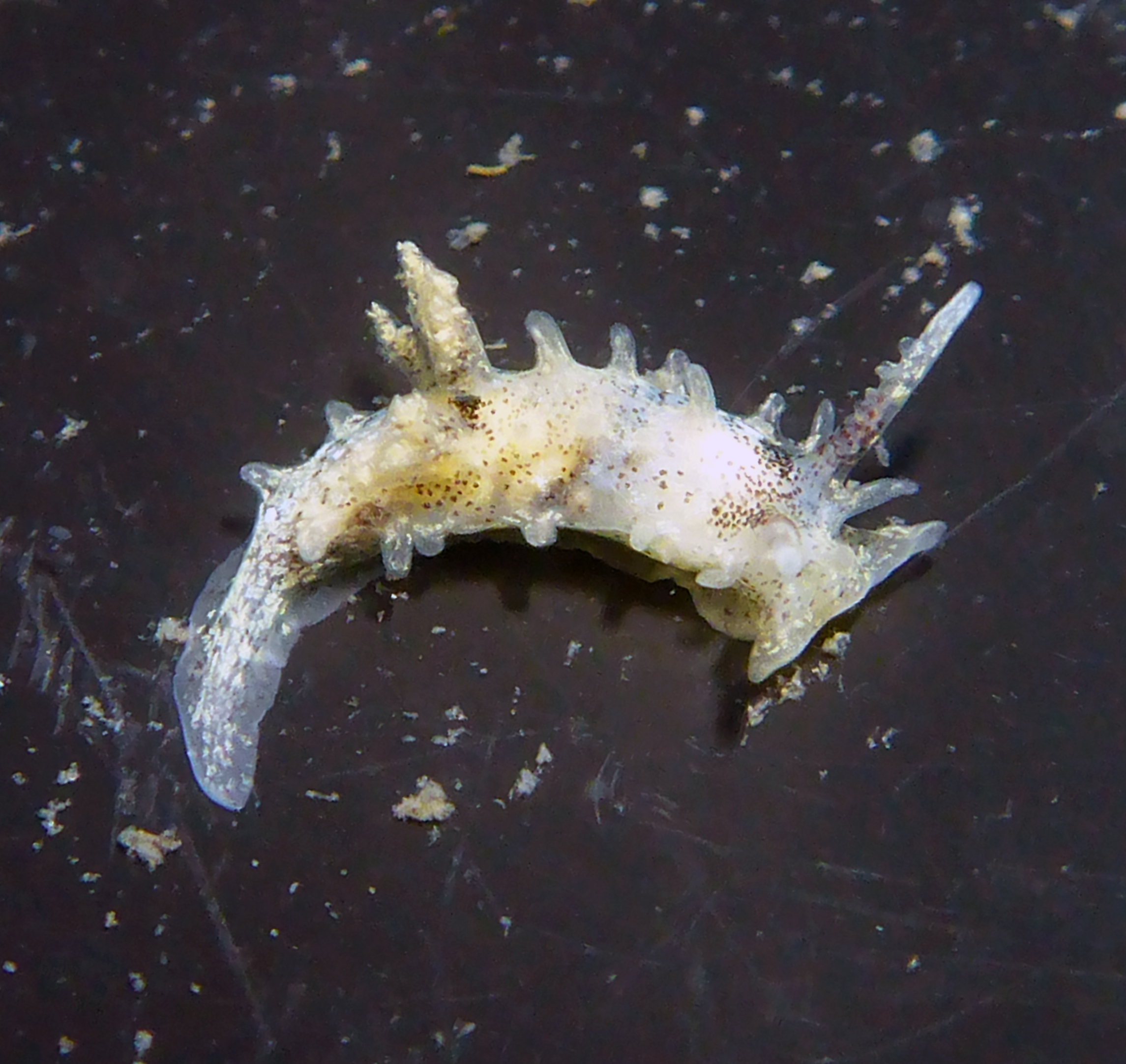
- Bermudella angelensis

Scientific classification
- Kingdom: Animalia
- Phylum: Mollusca
- Class: Gastropoda
- Order: Nudibranchia
- Family: Goniodorididae
- Subfamily: Goniodoridinae
- Genus: Bermudella
- Species: B. angelensis

Binomial name
- Bermudella angelensis (Lance, 1966)

Synonyms
- Okenia angelensis Lance, 1966

= Bermudella angelensis =

Species of gastropod

Bermudella angelensis common name Los Angeles Goniodorid, is a species of sea slug, specifically a dorid nudibranch, a marine gastropod mollusc in the family Goniodorididae.

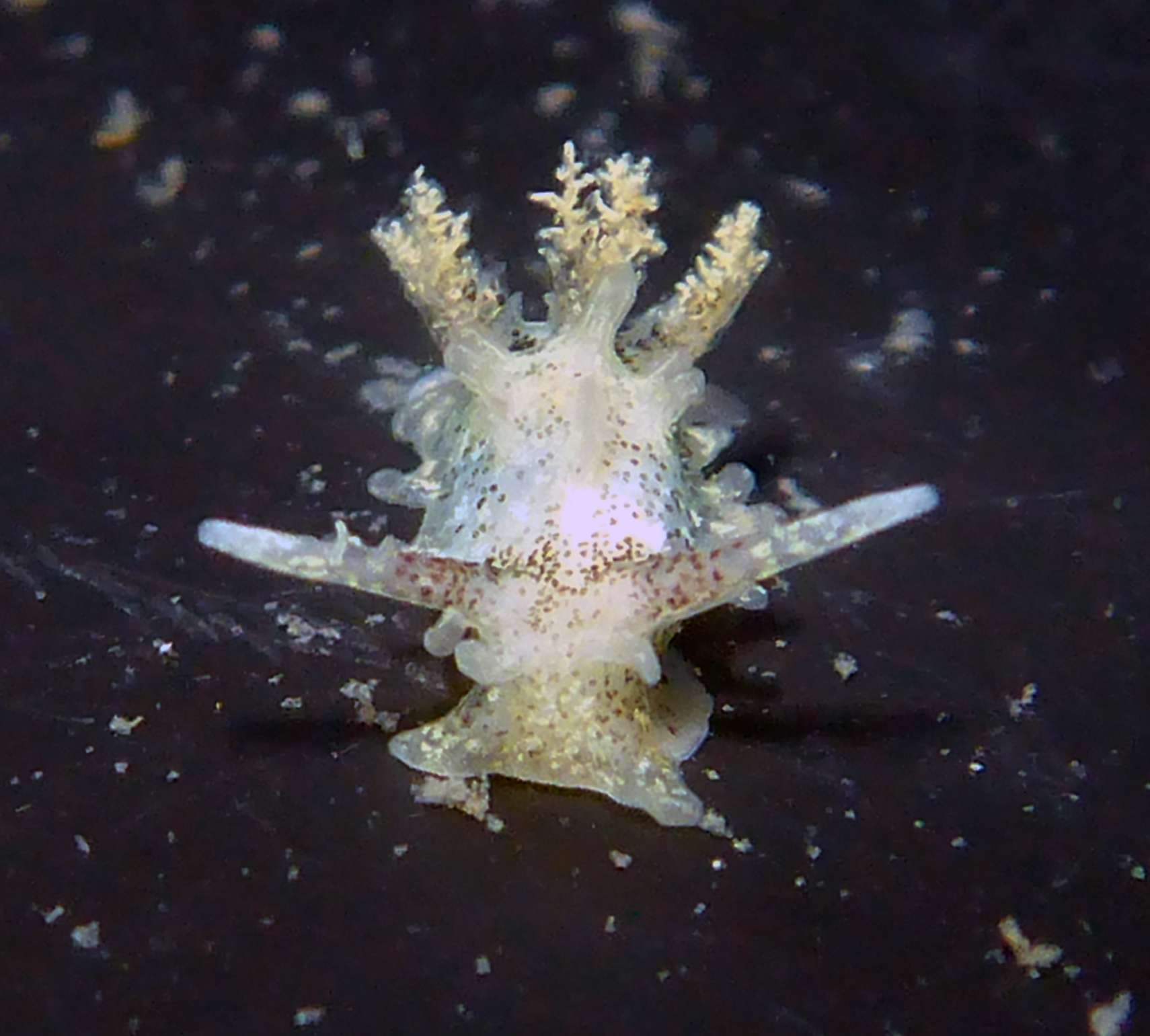
Okenia angelensis, front view

== Distribution ==
This species was described from California. It is known from San Francisco Bay south to Mexico and has been reported from Chile.

== Description ==
This Bermudella has a narrow body and seven to eight pairs of short lateral papillae. There are another eight papillae on the back, a pair in front of the rhinophores, two in the middle of the back and two pairs of two on either side of these, in front of the gills. The body is translucent and has many small spots of brown and larger spots of white pigment. It is similar in shape and arrangement of the papillae to Bermudella mija, Bermudella zoobotryon, Bermudella harastii and Bermudella distincta.

== Ecology ==
The diet of this species is a bryozoan, possibly a species of Amathia or Bowerbankia which lives in shallow water and on floating structures.
