= Bermudella zoobotryon =

Scientific classification
- Kingdom: Animalia
- Phylum: Mollusca
- Class: Gastropoda
- Order: Nudibranchia
- Family: Goniodorididae
- Subfamily: Goniodoridinae
- Genus: Bermudella
- Species: B. zoobotryon

Binomial name
- Bermudella zoobotryon (Smallwood, 1910)

Synonyms
- Okenia zoobotryon (Smallwood, 1910); Polycerella zoobotryon (Smallwood, 1910)

Species of gastropod

Bermudella zoobotryon is a species of sea slug, a dorid nudibranch, a marine gastropod mollusc in the subfamily Goniodoridinae in the family Goniodorididae. . It is normally found on the colonial bryozoan Amathia verticillata on which it lives and feeds.

== Distribution ==
Bermudella zoobotryon is found in the temperate and warm waters of the western Atlantic Ocean and Caribbean Sea. It was also reported from the Canary Islands, Brazil and Australia, on the assumption that it had travelled with its host species. This is now known to be incorrect and the animals from the Pacific Ocean have been shown to be distinct species.

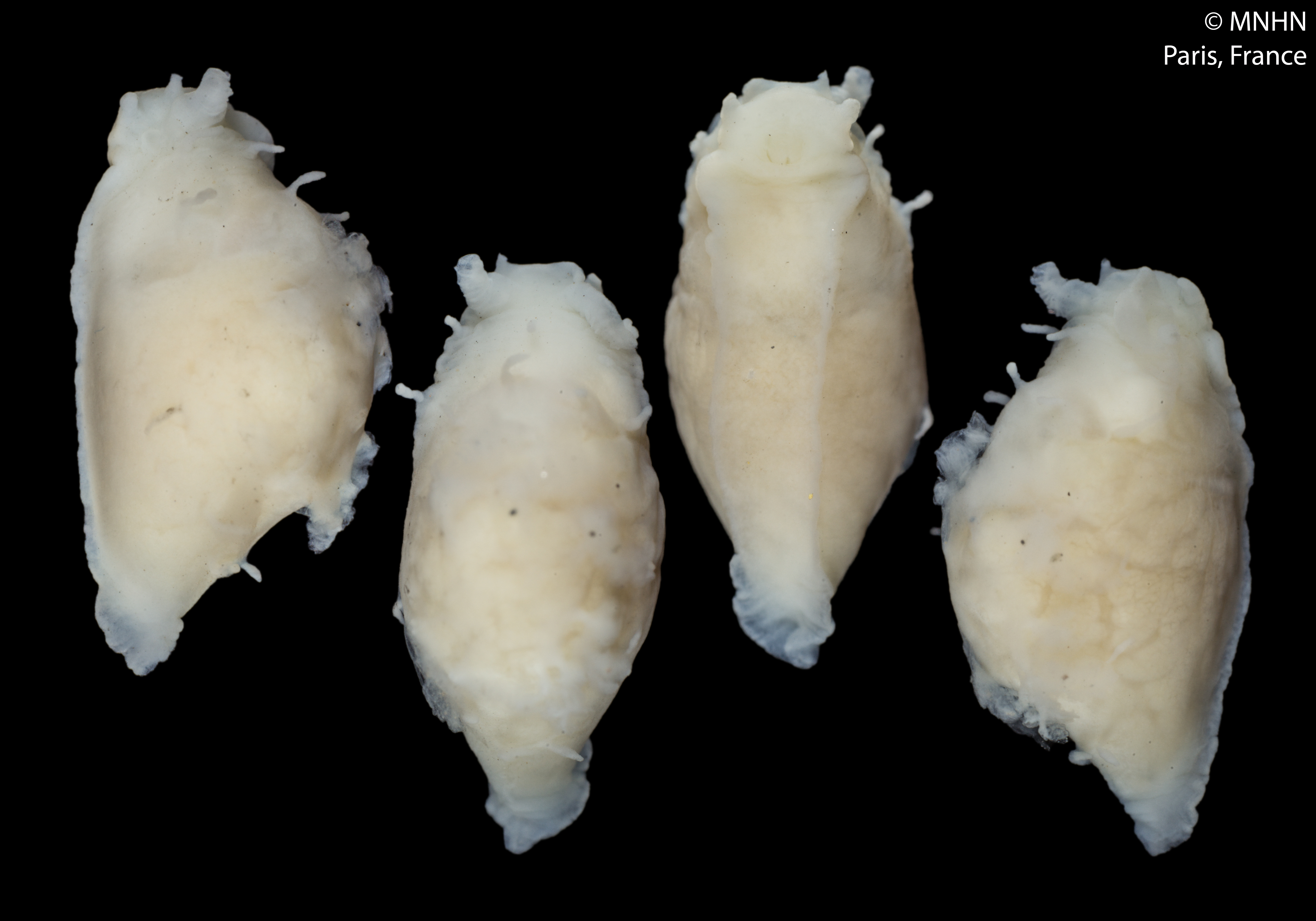
Bermudella zoobotryon (holotype at MNHN, Paris)

== Description ==
Bermudella zoobotryon is a small sea slug growing to between 3 and 6 mm (0.12 and 0.24 in) in length. The maximum recorded body length is 8 mm. The rhinophores are unusual in that they have three to six cup-shaped folds on the posterior face. There are up to nine papillae (fleshy protuberances) in front of the gills and about six on either side of the mantle ridge. These papillae have slender stalks and globular tips. The colour of this sea slug is a translucent white speckled with brown spots on the mantle and with a few opaque white spots on the sides of the body and foot. This species is similar in shape and arrangement of the papillae to Bermudella mija, Bermudella angelensis, Bermudella harastii and Bermudella distincta.

== Ecology ==
It lives, feeds and lays its eggs primarily on the bryozoan Amathia verticillata. Occasionally the egg masses and adults are found on the bryozoan Scrupocellaria regularis and the red alga Gracilaria sp. growing in tangled clumps with Amathia verticillata and adults have occasionally been found on the bryozoan Bowerbankia maxima.

Minimum recorded depth is 1 m. Maximum recorded depth is 5 m.

Bermudella zoobotryon lays egg masses on the surface of its host. These are flat, gelatinous ribbons attached by one edge to the underlying surface. The eggs are enclosed in capsules and hatch after about five days, developing into veliger larvae that soon begin to feed on microalgae and are planktonic. They settle in about eight days, being attracted to Amathia verticillata by chemical cues, and undergo metamorphosis into juveniles within twenty-four hours of settlement.

Bermudella zoobotryon seems to be a stenophagous feeder, one that selectively feeds on one organism but is able to feed on others if the main prey species is unavailable. In fact, during feeding trials, adults did not actively select Amathia verticillata over other possible prey species. Amathia verticillata contains certain secondary metabolites which make it distasteful to most predators. Bermudella zoobotryon feeding on it were found to contain many of the same chemicals and it is likely that these have similar anti-predatory functions in the sea slug.
