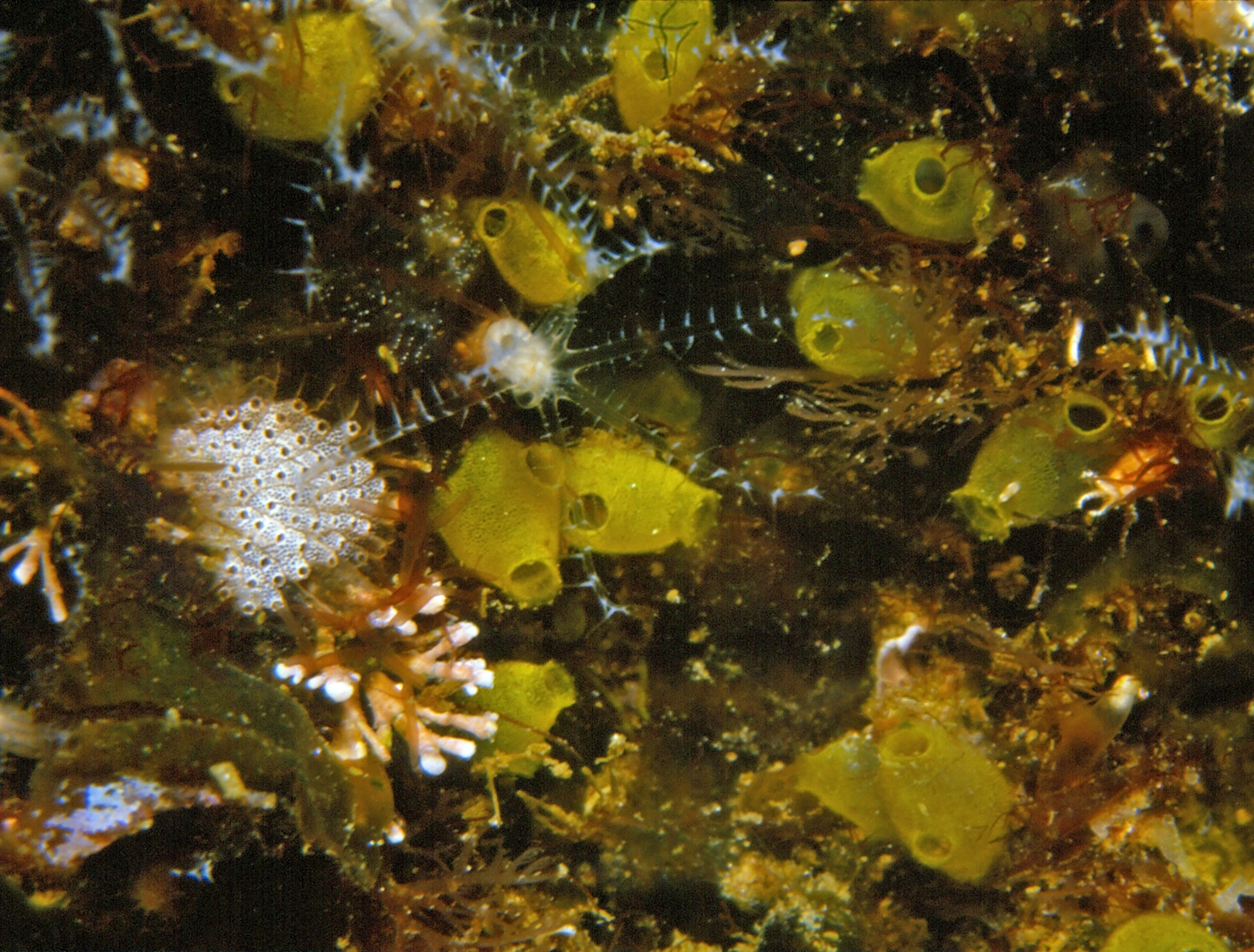
- Ecteinascidia herdmani

Scientific classification
- Domain: Eukaryota
- Kingdom: Animalia
- Phylum: Chordata
- Subphylum: Tunicata
- Class: Ascidiacea
- Order: Phlebobranchia
- Family: Perophoridae
- Genus: Ecteinascidia; Herdman, 1880

Synonyms
- Perophoropsis Lahille, 1890; Sluiteria

= Ecteinascidia =

Genus of sea squirts

Ecteinascidia is a sea squirt genus in the family Perophoridae.
