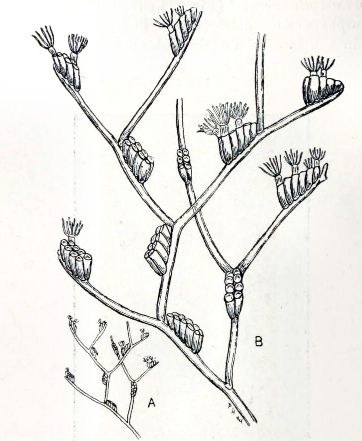
- Amathia lendigera

Scientific classification
- Kingdom: Animalia
- Phylum: Bryozoa
- Class: Gymnolaemata
- Order: Ctenostomatida
- Superfamily: Vesicularioidea
- Family: Vesiculariidae

= Vesiculariidae =

Family of bryozoans

Vesiculariidae is a family of bryozoans belonging to the order Ctenostomatida.

Genera:

- Amathia Lamouroux, 1812
- Avenella Dalyell, 1847
- Crassicaula Baranova, 1992
- Vesicularia Thompson, 1830
- Watersiana Calvet, 1912
