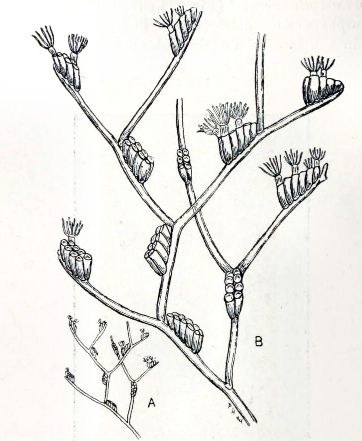
- Amathia lendigera

Scientific classification
- Kingdom: Animalia
- Phylum: Bryozoa
- Class: Gymnolaemata
- Order: Ctenostomatida
- Family: Vesiculariidae
- Genus: Amathia; Lamouroux, 1812

Synonyms
- Bowerbankia Farre, 1837

= Amathia (bryozoan) =

Genus of bryozoans

Amathia is a genus of bryozoans belonging to the family Vesiculariidae.

The genus has cosmopolitan distribution.

== Species ==
Species:

- Amathia acervata Lamouroux, 1824
- Amathia aegyptiana d'Hondt, 1983
- Amathia aggregata (O'Donoghue & O'Donoghue, 1926)
