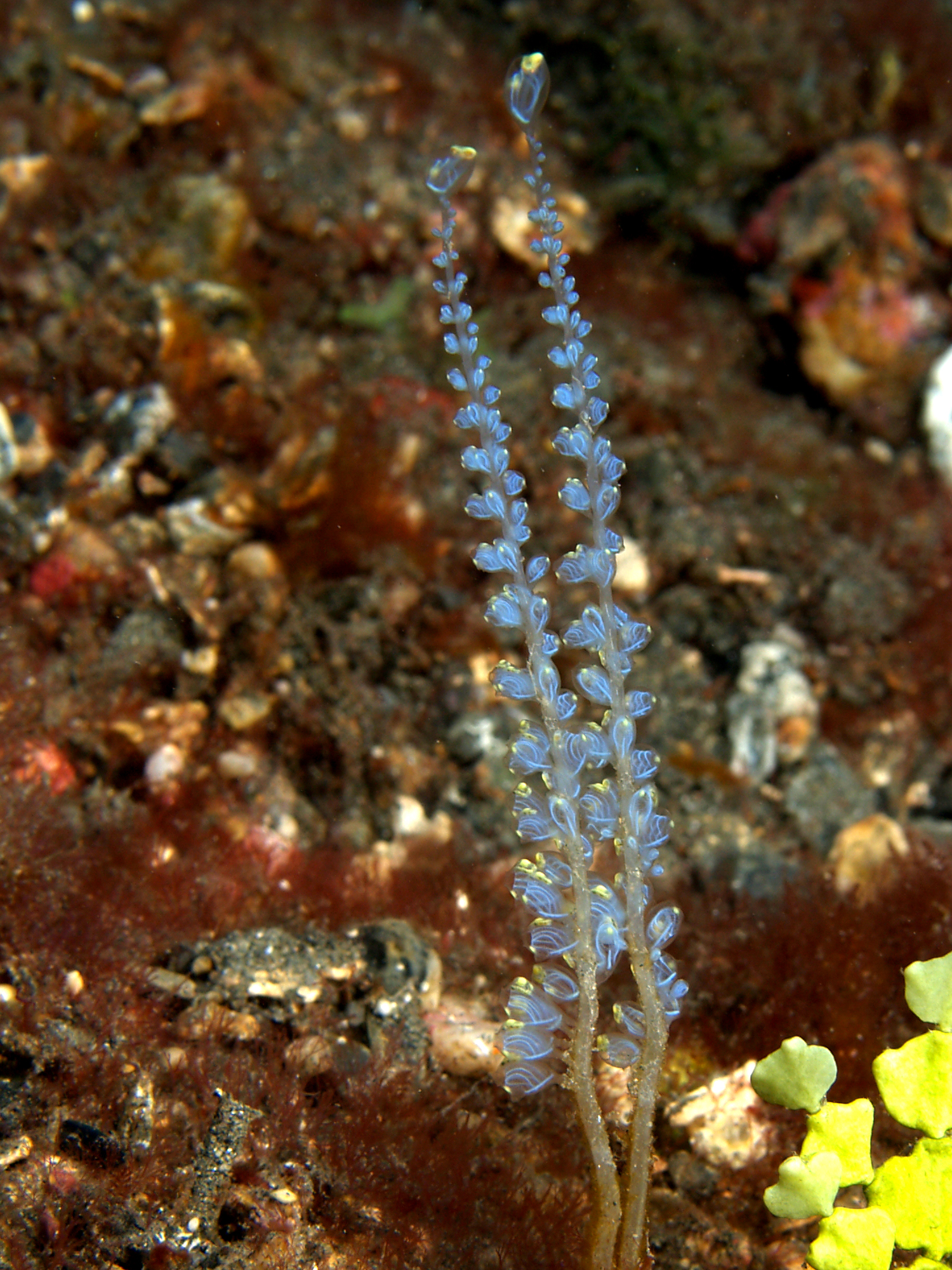
- Perophora namei

Scientific classification
- Domain: Eukaryota
- Kingdom: Animalia
- Phylum: Chordata
- Subphylum: Tunicata
- Class: Ascidiacea
- Order: Phlebobranchia
- Family: Perophoridae; Giard, 1872

Genera
- Ecteinascidia; Perophora

= Perophoridae =

Family of tunicates

Perophoridae is a family of sea squirts in the order Phlebobranchia.
