= Iju =

Iju or IJU may refer to:

- H. iju, a species of sea slug
- Iju, Ogun, a town in southern Ogun and northern Lagos, Nigeria*
- Ijuí Airport, Brazil (IATA code)
- Islamic Jihad Union, an Islamic terrorist group
- ISU Judging System, developed by the International Skating Union (ISU)
- Indian Journal of Urology

== People with the surname ==
- Minami Iju (伊集 南; born 1990), Japanese women's basketball player
- Seiichi Iju, Japanese martial artist
