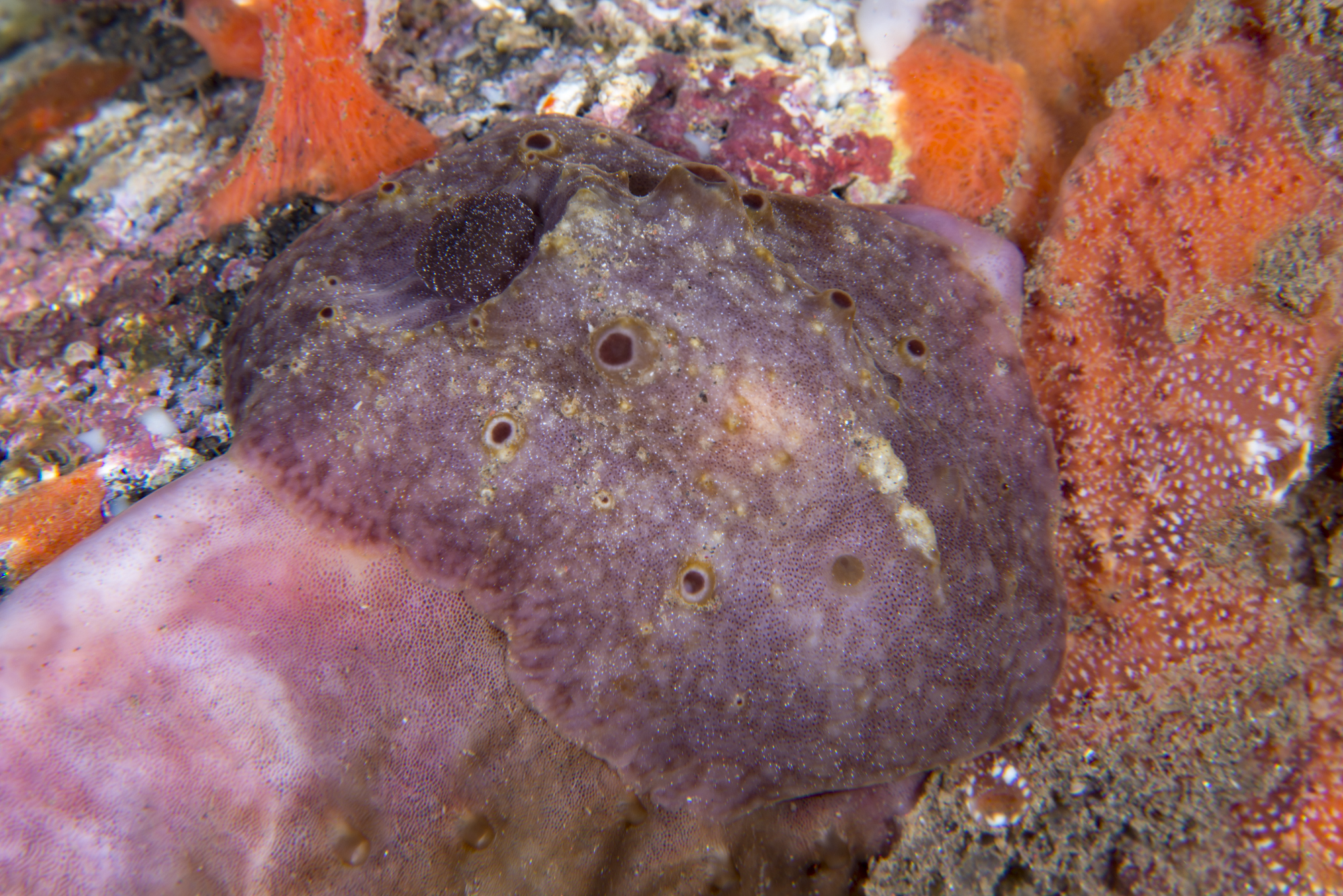
- Sidem, Bali, Indonesia

Scientific classification
- Kingdom: Animalia
- Phylum: Mollusca
- Class: Gastropoda
- Order: Nudibranchia
- Family: Actinocyclidae
- Genus: Actinocyclus
- Species: A. verrucosus

Binomial name
- Actinocyclus verrucosus Ehrenberg, 1831

Synonyms
- Actinocyclus laevis (Bergh, 1890); Sphaerodoris laevis Bergh, 1890; Aldisa nhatrangensis Risbec, 1956

= Actinocyclus verrucosus =

Species of gastropod

Actinocyclus verrucosus is a species of sea slug or dorid nudibranch, a marine gastropod mollusk in the family Actinocyclidae.

== Distribution ==
This species was described from Massawa, Eritrea, Red Sea. It is widespread in the tropical Indo-Pacific Ocean.
