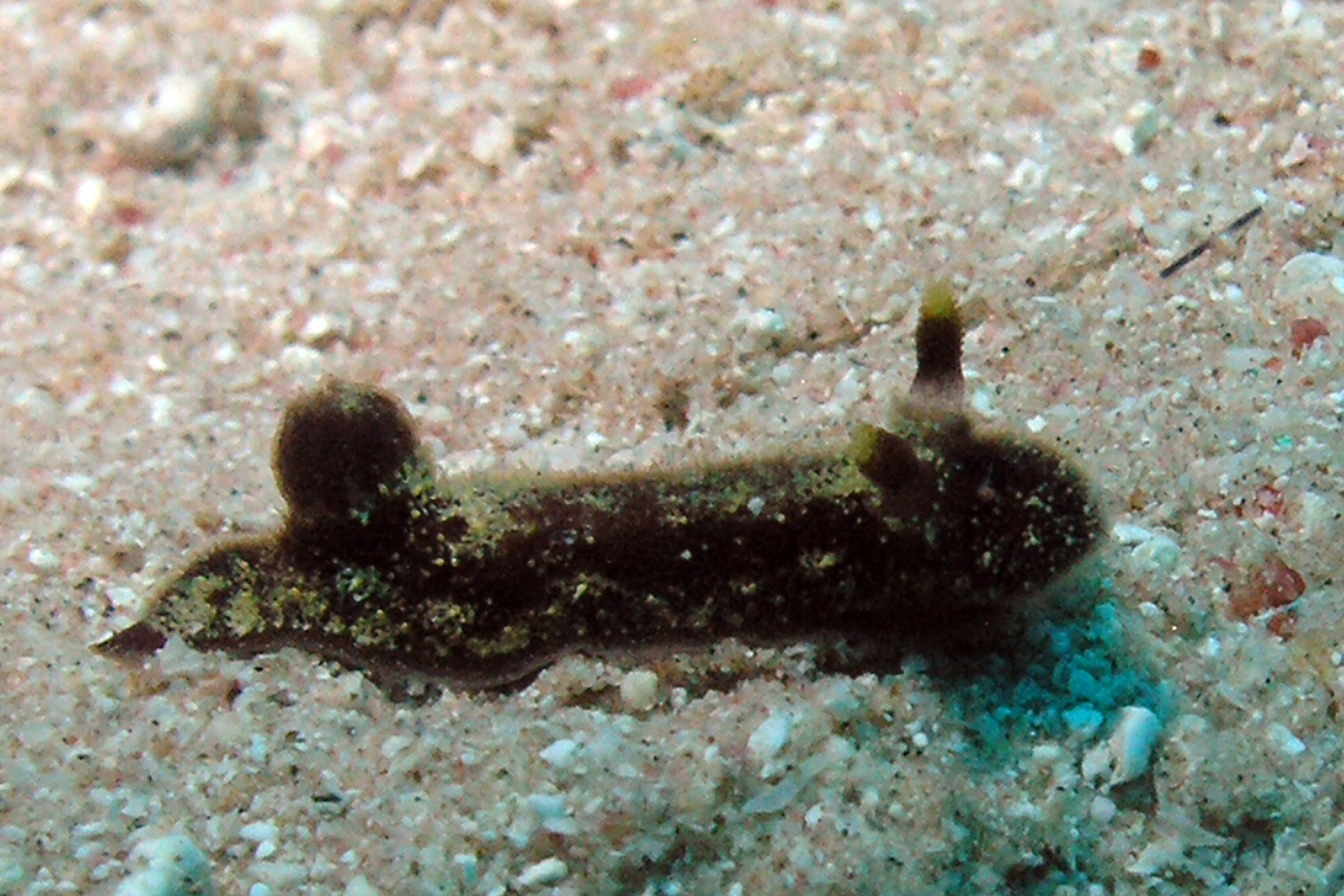
- Hallaxa indecora

Scientific classification
- Kingdom: Animalia
- Phylum: Mollusca
- Class: Gastropoda
- Order: Nudibranchia
- Family: Actinocyclidae
- Genus: Hallaxa
- Species: H. indecora

Binomial name
- Hallaxa indecora (Bergh, 1905)

= Hallaxa indecora =

Species of gastropod

Hallaxa indecora is a species of sea slug or dorid nudibranch, a marine gastropod mollusk in the family Actinocyclidae.
