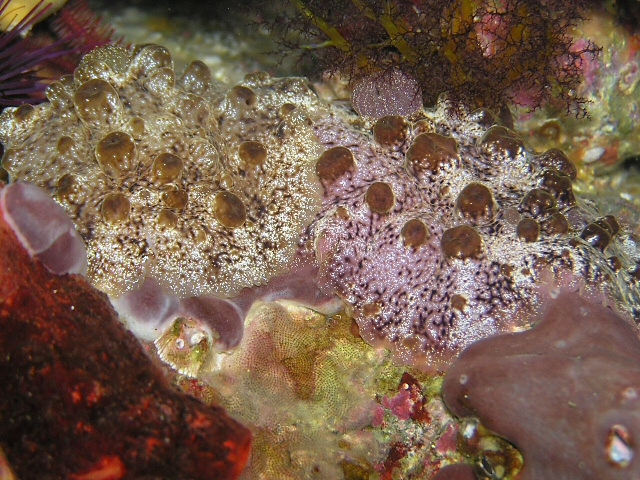
- live Actinocyclus papillatus

Scientific classification
- Kingdom: Animalia
- Phylum: Mollusca
- Class: Gastropoda
- Order: Nudibranchia
- Family: Actinocyclidae
- Genus: Actinocyclus
- Species: A. papillatus

Binomial name
- Actinocyclus papillatus (Bergh, 1878)

= Actinocyclus papillatus =

Species of gastropod

Actinocyclus papillatus is a species of sea slug or dorid nudibranch, a marine gastropod mollusk in the family Actinocyclidae.

== Distribution ==
Actinocyclus papillatus is found in the tropical Western Indo-Pacific Ocean.

== Description ==
This nudibranch grows up to 100 mm in length.
