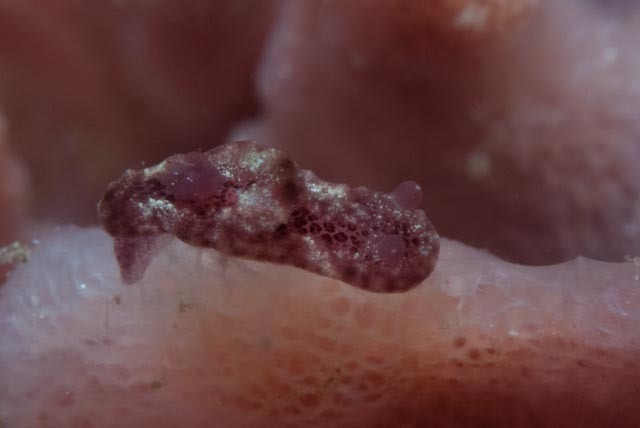

Scientific classification
- Kingdom: Animalia
- Phylum: Mollusca
- Class: Gastropoda
- Order: Nudibranchia
- Family: Actinocyclidae
- Genus: Hallaxa
- Species: H. hileenae

Binomial name
- Hallaxa hileenae Gosliner & S. Johnson, 1994

= Hallaxa hileenae =

Species of gastropod

Hallaxa hileenae is a species of sea slug or dorid nudibranch, a marine gastropod mollusk in the family Actinocyclidae.
