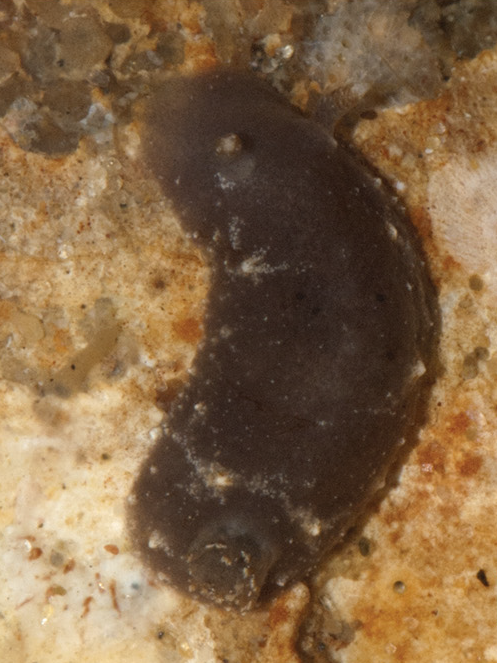

Scientific classification
- Kingdom: Animalia
- Phylum: Mollusca
- Class: Gastropoda
- Order: Nudibranchia
- Family: Actinocyclidae
- Genus: Hallaxa
- Species: H. elongata

Binomial name
- Hallaxa elongata Er. Marcus, 1957

= Hallaxa elongata =

Species of gastropod

Hallaxa elongata is a species of sea slug or dorid nudibranch, a marine gastropod mollusk in the family Actinocyclidae.
