= Hallaxa decorata =

Scientific classification
- Kingdom: Animalia
- Phylum: Mollusca
- Class: Gastropoda
- Order: Nudibranchia
- Family: Actinocyclidae
- Genus: Hallaxa
- Species: H. decorata

Binomial name
- Hallaxa decorata (Bergh, 1877)

Species of gastropod

Hallaxa decorata is a species of sea slug or dorid nudibranch, a marine gastropod mollusk in the family Actinocyclidae.
