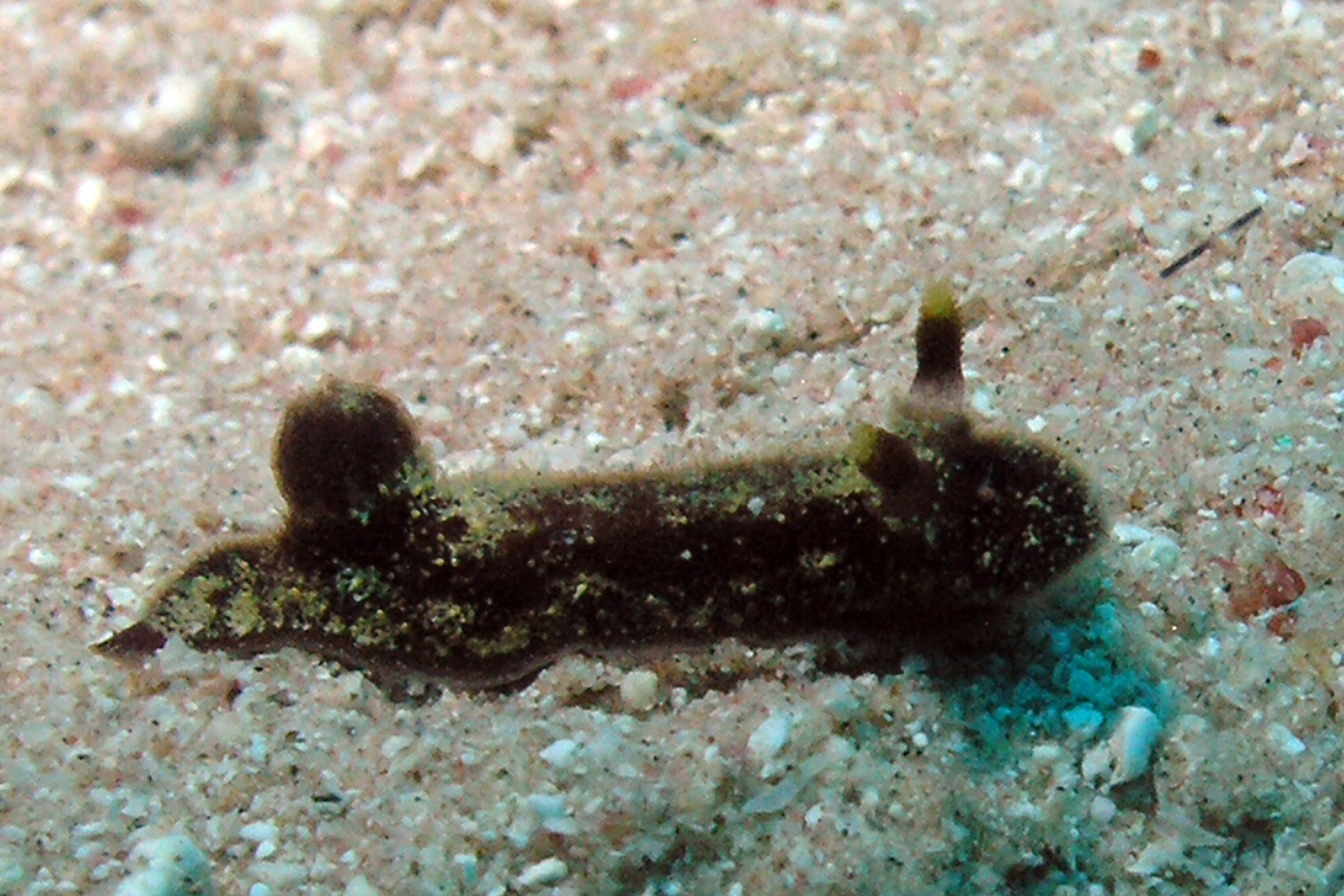
- Hallaxa indecora

Scientific classification
- Kingdom: Animalia
- Phylum: Mollusca
- Class: Gastropoda
- Order: Nudibranchia
- Superfamily: Doridoidea
- Family: Actinocyclidae; O'Donoghue, 1929

Type genus
- Actinocyclus

= Actinocyclidae =

Family of gastropods

Actinocyclidae is a family of sea slugs, dorid nudibranchs, marine gastropod mollusks in the superfamily Doridoidea. This family is within the clade Euctenidiacea.

== Taxonomy ==
Genera within the family Actinocyclidae include:

- Actinocyclus Ehrenberg, 1831 - the type genus
  - Actinocyclus papillatus (Bergh, 1878)
  - Actinocyclus verrucosus Ehrenberg, 1831
- Hallaxa Eliot, 1909
  - Hallaxa albopunctata Gosliner & S. Johnson, 1994
  - Hallaxa apefae Marcus, 1957
  - Hallaxa atrotuberculata Gosliner & S. Johnson, 1994
  - Hallaxa chani Gosliner & Williams, 1975
  - Hallaxa cryptica Gosliner & Johnson, 1994
  - Hallaxa decorata Bergh, 1905
  - Hallaxa elongata Gosliner & S. Johnson, 1994
  - Hallaxa fuscescens Pease, 1871
  - Hallaxa gilva Miller, 1987
  - Hallaxa hileenae Gosliner & Johnson, 1994
  - Hallaxa iju Gosliner & Johnson, 1994
  - Hallaxa indecora (Bergh, 1877)
  - Hallaxa michaeli Gosliner & Johnson, 1994
  - Hallaxa paulinae Gosliner & Johnson, 1994
  - Hallaxa translucens Gosliner & S. Johnson, 1994

Each genus also has a synonym. Sphaerodoris is a synonym for Actinocyclus and Halla is a synonym for Hallaxa
