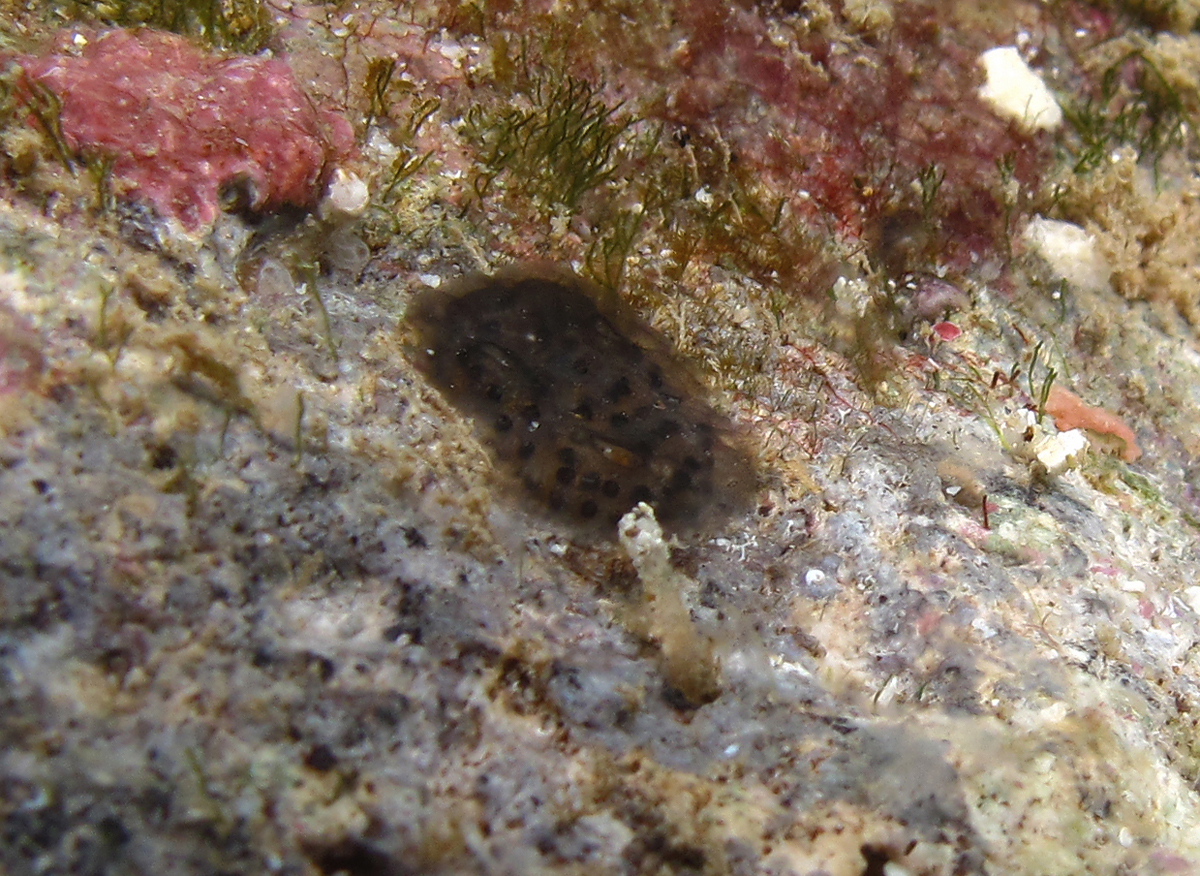

Scientific classification
- Kingdom: Animalia
- Phylum: Mollusca
- Class: Gastropoda
- Order: Nudibranchia
- Family: Actinocyclidae
- Genus: Hallaxa
- Species: H. fuscescens

Binomial name
- Hallaxa fuscescens (Pease, 1871)

= Hallaxa fuscescens =

Species of gastropod

Hallaxa fuscescens is a species of sea slug or dorid nudibranch, a marine gastropod mollusk in the family Actinocyclidae.

There is some doubt regarding the correct taxonomic classification of this species.

== Distribution ==
This species is found in the tropical Indo-Pacific Ocean.
