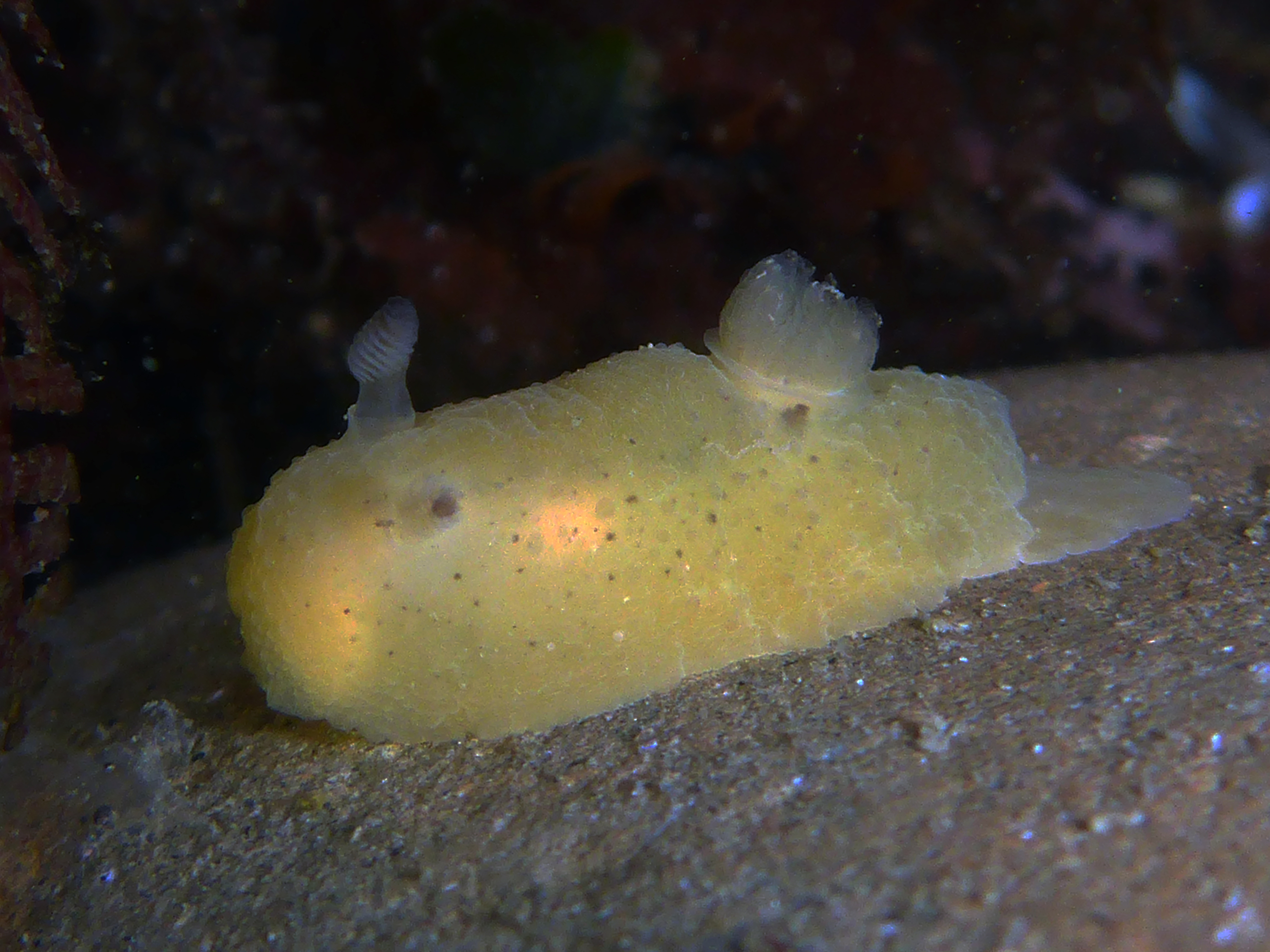
- Hallaxa chani from Pillar Point, California

Scientific classification
- Kingdom: Animalia
- Phylum: Mollusca
- Class: Gastropoda
- Order: Nudibranchia
- Family: Actinocyclidae
- Genus: Hallaxa
- Species: H. chani

Binomial name
- Hallaxa chani Gosliner & Williams, 1975

= Hallaxa chani =

Species of gastropod

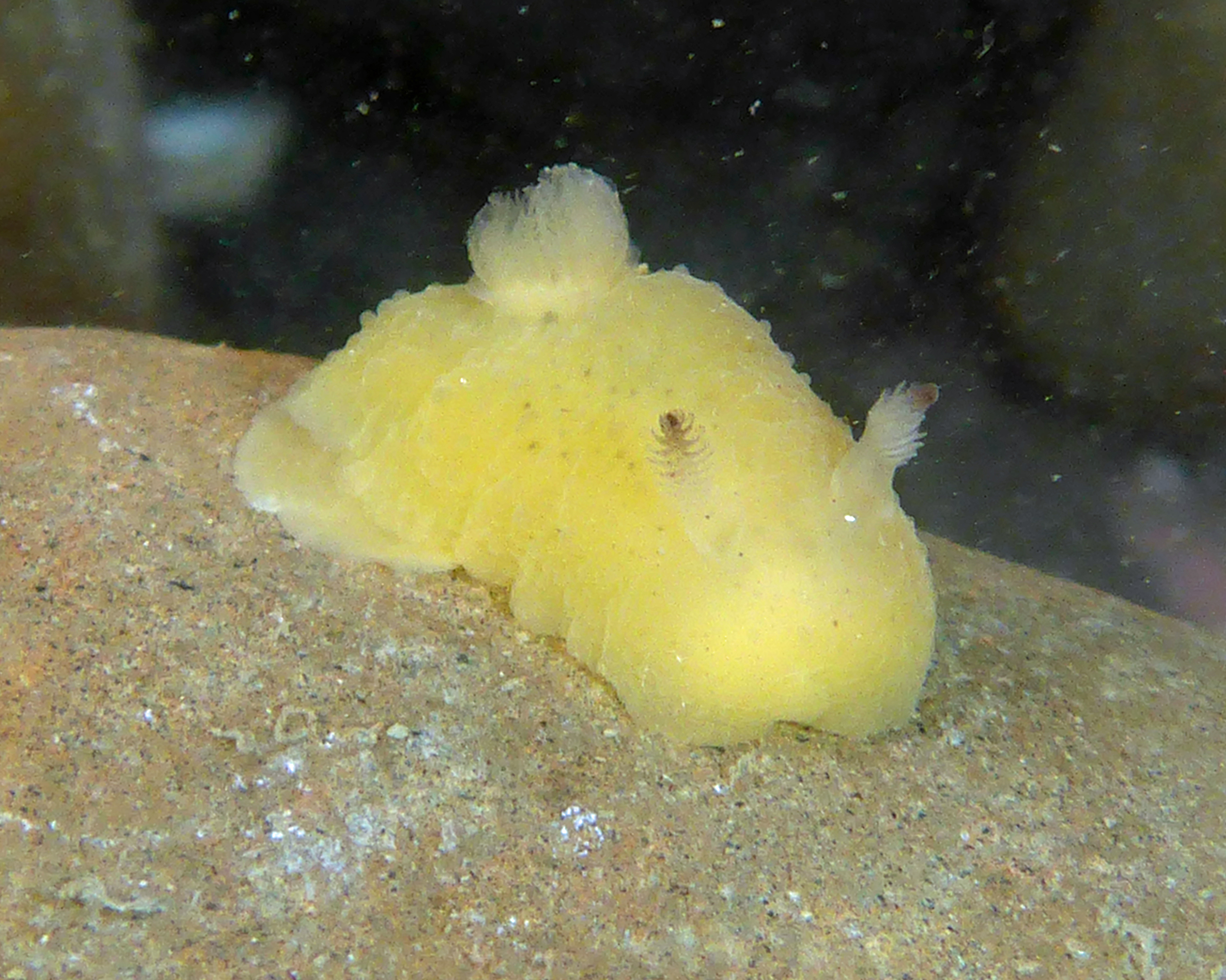
Hallaxa chani from Pillar Point, California

Hallaxa chani is a species of sea slug or dorid nudibranch, a marine gastropod mollusk in the family Actinocyclidae.

== Distribution ==
Hallaxa chani ranges from central California to southeast Alaska (Gosliner & Williams, 1975; Millen, 1989). It is rare in the southern part of its range, but in the Pacific Northwest, can be quite common in boulder/cobble habitats with large populations of its sponge prey, Halisarca sp. (Goddard, 1981, 1984; Goddard et al., 1997). Most records of Hallaxa chani are from the intertidal zone, but Millen (1983 and 1989) found it subtidally at unspecified depths in British Columbia and Alaska.

== Description ==
Hallaxa chani preys exclusively on Halisarca sp., a slick-textured dendroceratid sponge lacking both spicules and spongin fibers (Goddard, 1981, 1984, 1998). Like its congeners, Hallaxa chani is remarkably cryptic on its prey, both in color and texture. Both are tan to yellow-tan in color, and Hallaxa chani also lacks spicules. Additionally, the mantle edge ofHallaxa chani is semi-translucent and blends in almost seamlessly when spread out on the surface of Halisarca sp.

The radular teeth of Hallaxa chani are similar in shape to those of other nudibranchs known to prey primarily on sponges that lack spicules and provided an early clue that Hallaxa chani does not feed on colonial ascidians as originally reported by McDonald & Nybakken (1978) (Goddard, 1981). As noted by Nybakken & McDonald (1981), nudibranchs that specialize on ascidians or fleshy ctenostome bryozoans have a radula dominated by large, paired, wing-shaped lateral teeth. Dorids specializing on dendroceratid and dictyoceratid sponges have thin, comb-like outer lateral teeth with multiple denticles (Goddard, 1981, personal observations; Rudman, 1984; and see electron micrographs of radulae in Gosliner & Johnson, 1994).
