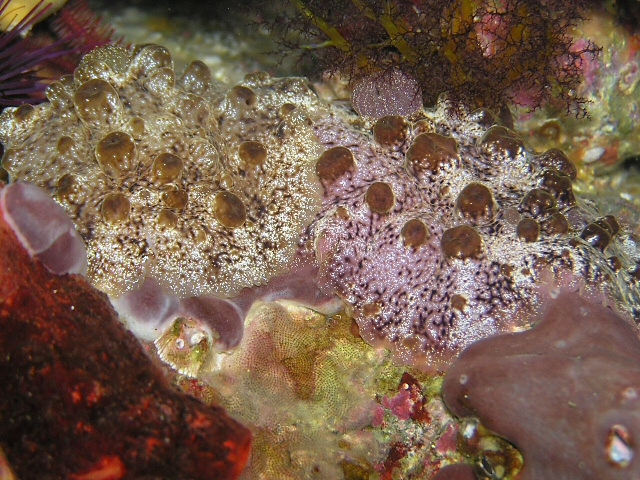
- live Actinocyclus papillatus

Scientific classification
- Kingdom: Animalia
- Phylum: Mollusca
- Class: Gastropoda
- Order: Nudibranchia
- Family: Actinocyclidae
- Genus: Actinocyclus; Ehrenberg, 1831

Synonyms
- Sphaerodoris Bergh 1877

= Actinocyclus =

Genus of gastropods

Actinocyclus is a genus of sea slugs, dorid nudibranchs, shell-less marine gastropod molluscs in the family Actinocyclidae, and was first described by Christian Gottfried Ehrenberg in 1831.

== Species ==
Species in the genus Actinocyclus include:

- Actinocyclus papillatus (Bergh, 1878)
- Actinocyclus verrucosus Ehrenberg, 1831

== See also ==
- Actinocyclus Ehrenberg, 1837, a genus of diatoms in the family Hemidiscaceae.
