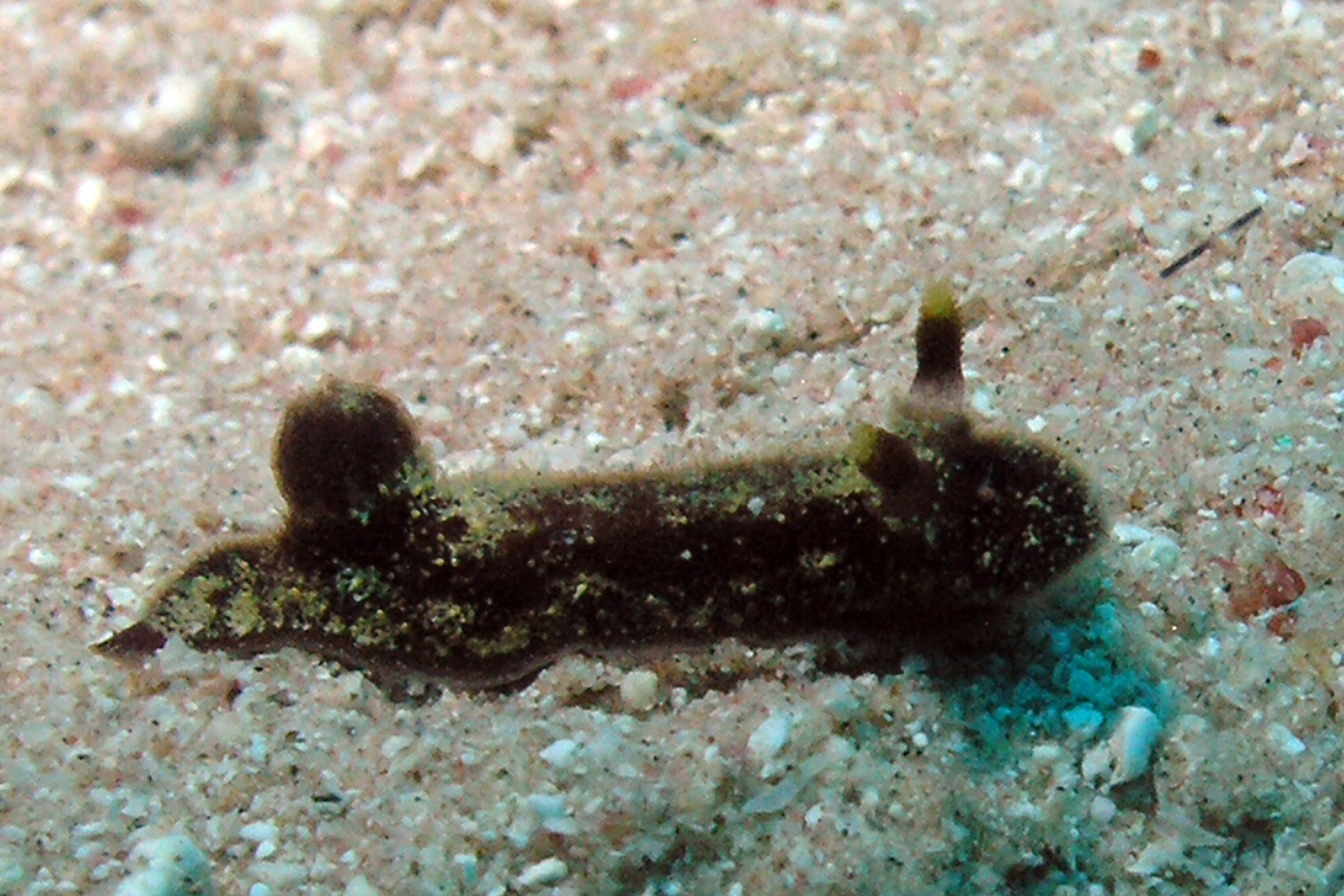
- Hallaxa indecora

Scientific classification
- Kingdom: Animalia
- Phylum: Mollusca
- Class: Gastropoda
- Order: Nudibranchia
- Family: Actinocyclidae
- Genus: Hallaxa; Eliot, 1909

Synonyms
- Halla Bergh, 1877 (Invalid: junior homonym of Halla Costa, 1844 [Annelida]; Hallaxa is a replacement name)

= Hallaxa =

Genus of gastropods

Hallaxa is a genus of sea slugs, dorid nudibranchs, shell-less marine gastropod molluscs in the family Actinocyclidae.

== Species ==
Species in the genus Hallaxa include:

- Hallaxa albopunctata Gosliner & S. Johnson, 1994
- Hallaxa apefae Marcus, 1957
- Hallaxa atrotuberculata Gosliner & S. Johnson, 1994
- Hallaxa chani Gosliner & Williams, 1975
- Hallaxa cryptica Gosliner & Johnson, 1994
- Hallaxa decorata Bergh, 1905
- Hallaxa elongata Gosliner & S. Johnson, 1994
- Hallaxa fuscescens Pease, 1871
- Hallaxa gilva Miller, 1987
- Hallaxa hileenae Gosliner & Johnson, 1994
- Hallaxa iju Gosliner & Johnson, 1994
- Hallaxa indecora (Bergh, 1877)
- Hallaxa michaeli Gosliner & Johnson, 1994
- Hallaxa paulinae Gosliner & Johnson, 1994
- Hallaxa translucens Gosliner & S. Johnson, 1994
