= Hallaxa apefae =

Scientific classification
- Kingdom: Animalia
- Phylum: Mollusca
- Class: Gastropoda
- Order: Nudibranchia
- Family: Actinocyclidae
- Genus: Hallaxa
- Species: H. apefae

Binomial name
- Hallaxa apefae Er. Marcus, 1957

Species of gastropod

Hallaxa apefae is a species of sea slug or dorid nudibranch, a marine gastropod mollusk in the family Actinocyclidae. It is found in the Caribbean and South America.
