= Hallaxa atrotuberculata =

Scientific classification
- Kingdom: Animalia
- Phylum: Mollusca
- Class: Gastropoda
- Order: Nudibranchia
- Family: Actinocyclidae
- Genus: Hallaxa
- Species: H. atrotuberculata

Binomial name
- Hallaxa atrotuberculata Gosliner & S. Johnson, 1994

Species of gastropod

Hallaxa atrotuberculata is a species of sea slug or dorid nudibranch, a marine gastropod mollusk in the family Actinocyclidae. It is found in Madagascar and the Seychelles.
