= Hallaxa michaeli =

Scientific classification
- Kingdom: Animalia
- Phylum: Mollusca
- Class: Gastropoda
- Order: Nudibranchia
- Family: Actinocyclidae
- Genus: Hallaxa
- Species: H. michaeli

Binomial name
- Hallaxa michaeli Gosliner & S. Johnson, 1994

Species of gastropod

Hallaxa michaeli is a species of sea slug or dorid nudibranch, a marine gastropod mollusk in the family Actinocyclidae. It is found on the southern coast of Australia.
