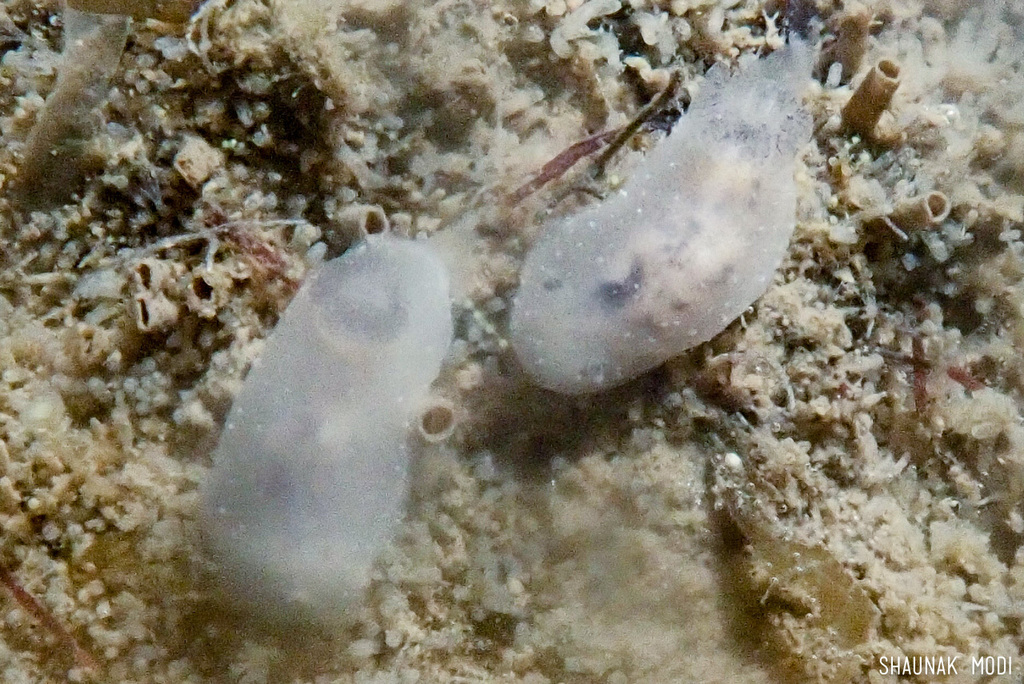

Scientific classification
- Kingdom: Animalia
- Phylum: Mollusca
- Class: Gastropoda
- Order: Nudibranchia
- Family: Actinocyclidae
- Genus: Hallaxa
- Species: H. albopunctata

Binomial name
- Hallaxa albopunctata Gosliner & S. Johnson, 1994

= Hallaxa albopunctata =

Species of gastropod

Hallaxa albopunctata is a species of sea slug or dorid nudibranch, a marine gastropod mollusk in the family Actinocyclidae.
