= Hallaxa iju =

Scientific classification
- Kingdom: Animalia
- Phylum: Mollusca
- Class: Gastropoda
- Order: Nudibranchia
- Family: Actinocyclidae
- Genus: Hallaxa
- Species: H. iju

Binomial name
- Hallaxa iju Gosliner & S. Johnson, 1994

Species of gastropod

Hallaxa iju is a species of sea slug or dorid nudibranch, a marine gastropod mollusk in the family Actinocyclidae.

== Distribution ==
This species is found off in the Pacific Ocean, off the coasts of Papua New Guinea, Marshall Islands, Okinawa, Philippines, Hong Kong, and Hawaii.

== Description ==
Hallaxa iju has an oval shaped body, with individual coloration varying. Most have a cream colored, brown, dark violet or black body, spotted with white dots. The rhinophores are club shaped, the tops of which are opaque white, with the base matching the body color. Most specimens have a length of 5mm-1 cm.
