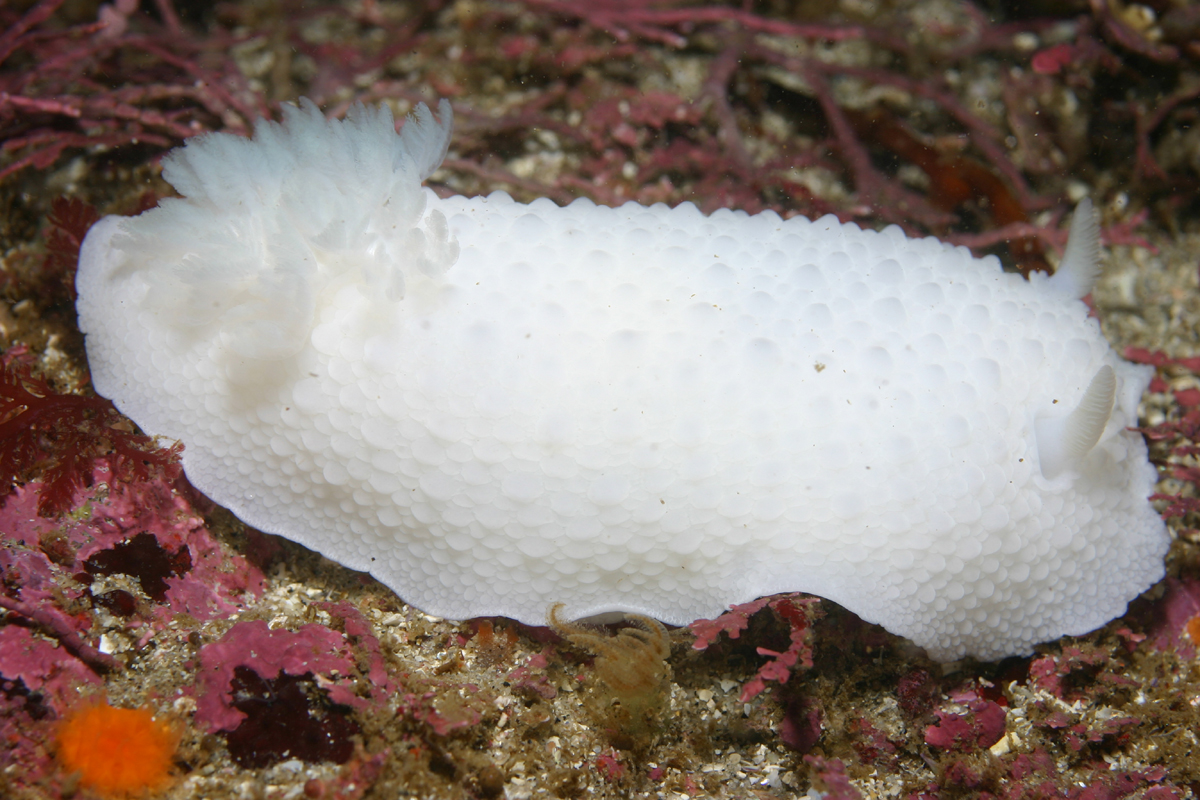
- A live individual of Doris odhneri, head towards the right

Scientific classification
- Kingdom: Animalia
- Phylum: Mollusca
- Class: Gastropoda
- Order: Nudibranchia
- Family: Dorididae
- Genus: Doris; Linnaeus, 1758

Synonyms
- Anoplodoris P. Fischer, 1883; Archidoris Bergh, 1878; Austrodoris Odhner, 1926; Ctenodoris Eliot, 1907; Doridigitata d'Orbigny, 1839; Doriopsis Pease, 1860; Doriorbis Kay & Young, 1969; Guyonia Risbec, 1928; Neodoris Baba, 1938; Praegliscita Burn, 1957; Siraius Er. Marcus, 1955; Staurodoris Bergh, 1878 (Invalid: Placed on the Official Index by ICZN Opinion 1980)

= Doris (gastropod) =

Genus of gastropods

Doris is a genus of sea slugs, specifically dorid nudibranchs. These animals are marine gastropod molluscs in the family Dorididae.

== Species ==
Species within the genus Doris include:

- Doris acerico Ortea & Espinosa, 2017
- Doris adrianae Urgorri, Señarís, Díaz-Agras, Candás & Gómez-Rodríguez, 2021
- Doris alboranica Bouchet, 1977
- Doris ananas Lima, Tibiriça & Simone, 2016
- Doris atypica (Eliot, 1906)
- Doris beringiensis (Martynov, Sanamyan & Korshunova, 2015)
- Doris bertheloti (d'Orbigny, 1839)
- Doris bicolor (Bergh, 1884)
- Doris bovena Er. Marcus, 1955
- Doris caeca (Valdés, 2001)
- Doris cameroni (Allan, 1947)
- Doris capensis (Bergh, 1907)
- Doris chrysoderma Angas, 1864
- Doris claurina (Er. Marcus, 1959)
- Doris elegans Quoy & Gaimard, 1832
- Doris falklandica (Eliot, 1907)
- Doris flabellifera Cheeseman, 1881
- Doris fontainii d'Orbigny, 1837
- Doris fretterae T. E. Thompson, 1980
- Doris fulva (Eliot, 1907)
- Doris granulosa (Pease, 1860)
- Doris hayeki Ortea, 1998
- Doris ilo (Er. Marcus, 1955)
- Doris immonda Risbec, 1928
- Doris januarii (Bergh, 1878)
- Doris kerguelenensis (Bergh, 1884)
- Doris kpone Edmunds, 2013
- Doris kyolis (Ev. Marcus & Er. Marcus, 1967)
- Doris laboutei (Valdés, 2001)
- Doris magnotuberculata (Martynov, Sanamyan & Korshunova, 2015)
- Doris marmorata Risso, 1818
- Doris minuta Edmunds, 2013
- Doris montereyensis J. G. Cooper, 1863
- Doris morenoi Ortea, 1989
- Doris nanula (Bergh, 1904)
- Doris nobilis Odhner, 1907
- Doris nucleola Pease, 1860
- Doris ocelligera (Bergh, 1881)
- Doris odhneri MacFarland, 1966
- Doris parrae Ortea, 2017
- Doris phyllophora Mørch, 1859 (species inquirenda)
- Doris pickensi Marcus & Marcus, 1967
- Doris pseudoargus Rapp, 1827
- Doris pseudoverrucosa (Ihering, 1886)
- Doris punctatissima Mørch, 1859 (species inquirenda)
- Doris scripta (Bergh, 1907)
- Doris sticta (Iredale & O'Donoghue, 1923)
- Doris sugashimae (Baba, 1998)
- Doris tanya Ev. Marcus, 1971
- Doris tricolor (Baba, 1938)
- Doris umbrella Rochebrune, 1895 (species inquirenda)
- Doris verrucosa Linnaeus, 1758
- Doris violacea (Bergh, 1904)
- Doris viridis (Pease, 1861)
- Doris wellingtonensis Abraham, 1877

Species brought into synonymy

- Doris affinis Gmelin, 1791 synonym of Flabellina affinis (Gmelin, 1791)
- Doris albescens Schultz in Philippi, 1836: synonym of Felimida purpurea (Risso in Guérin, 1831)
- Doris albopunctata J. G. Cooper, 1863: synonym of Doriopsilla albopunctata (J. G. Cooper, 1863)
- Doris albopustulosa Pease, 1860: synonym of Goniobranchus albopustulosus (Pease, 1860)
- Doris amabilis Kelaart, 1859: synonym of Chromodoris aspersa (Gould, 1852)
- Doris angustipes Mörch, 1863: synonym of Platydoris angustipes (Mörch, 1863)
- Doris apiculata Alder & Hancock, 1864: synonym of Sclerodoris apiculata (Alder & Hancock, 1864)
- Doris arborescens Müller O.F., 1776: synonym of Dendronotus frondosus (Ascanius, 1774)
- Doris arbutus Angas, 1864: synonym of Rostanga arbutus (Angas, 1864)
- Doris areolata Alder & Hancock, 1864: synonym of Dendrodoris areolata (Alder & Hancock, 1864)
- Doris areolata Stuwitz, 1836: synonym of Doris pseudoargus Rapp, 1827
- Doris argo Linnaeus, 1767: synonym of Platydoris argo (Linnaeus, 1767)
- Doris aspera Alder & Hancock, 1842: synonym of Onchidoris muricata (O. F. Müller, 1776)
- Doris aspersa Gould, 1852: synonym of Chromodoris aspersa (Gould, 1852)
- Doris atrata Kelaart, 1858: synonym of Dendrodoris fumata (Rüppell & Leuckart, 1830)
- Doris atromarginata Cuvier, 1804: synonym of Doriprismatica atromarginata (Cuvier, 1804)
- Doris atroviridis Kelaart, 1858: synonym of Dendrodoris nigra (Stimpson, 1855)
- Doris aurantiaca Eliot, 1913: synonym of Doris granulosa (Pease, 1860)
- Doris aurea Quoy & Gaimard, 1832: synonym of Dendrodoris aurea (Quoy & Gaimard, 1832): synonym of Doriopsilla aurea (Quoy & Gaimard, 1832)
- Doris auriculata Müller, 1776: synonym of Facelina auriculata (Müller, 1776)
- Doris aurita Gould, 1852: synonym of Gymnodoris aurita (Gould, 1852)
- Doris barnardi Collingwood, 1868: synonym of Chromodoris barnardi (Collingwood, 1868) (species inquirenda)
- Doris barvicensis Johnston, 1838: synonym of Goniodoris nodosa (Montagu, 1808)
- Doris beaumonti Farran, 1903: synonym of Diaphorodoris luteocincta (M. Sars, 1870)
- Doris bifida Montagu, 1815: synonym of Hermaea bifida (Montagu, 1815)
- Doris bifida Verrill, 1870: synonym of Acanthodoris pilosa (Abildgaard in Müller, 1789)
- Doris bilamellata Linnaeus, 1767: synonym of Onchidoris bilamellata (Linnaeus, 1767)
- Doris biscayensis P. Fischer, 1872: synonym of Doris verrucosa Linnaeus, 1758
- Doris bistellata Verrill, 1900: synonym of Aphelodoris antillensis Bergh, 1879
- Doris bodoensis Gunnerus, 1770: synonym of Aeolidia papillosa (Linnaeus, 1761)
- Doris branchialis Rathke, 1806: synonym of Favorinus branchialis (Rathke, 1806)
- Doris brittanica Johnston, 1838: synonym of Doris pseudoargus Rapp, 1827
- Doris caerulea Montagu, 1804: synonym of Cuthona caerulea (Montagu, 1804)
- Doris caerulea Risso, 1826: synonym of Felimare villafranca (Risso, 1818)
- Doris calcarae Vérany, 1846: synonym of Felimare picta (Schultz in Philippi, 1836)
- Doris canariensis d'Orbigny, 1839: synonym of Platydoris argo (Linnaeus, 1767)
- Doris carbunculosa Kelaart, 1858: synonym of Dendrodoris carbunculosa (Kelaart, 1858)
- Doris cardinalis Gould, 1852: synonym of Hexabranchus sanguineus (Rüppell & Leuckart, 1830)
- Doris carinata Quoy & Gaimard, 1832: synonym of Atagema carinata (Quoy & Gaimard, 1832)
- Doris carneola Angas, 1864: synonym of Doriopsilla carneola (Angas, 1864)
- Doris castanea Kelaart, 1858: synonym of Sclerodoris tuberculata Eliot, 1904
- Doris clavigera O. F. Müller, 1776: synonym of Limacia clavigera (O. F. Müller, 1776)
- Doris coccinea Forbes, 1848: synonym of Rostanga rubra (Risso, 1818)
- Doris coerulea Risso, 1818: synonym of Felimare villafranca (Risso, 1818)
- Doris complanata Verrill, 1880: synonym of Geitodoris planata (Alder & Hancock, 1846)
- Doris concinna Alder & Hancock, 1864: synonym of Montereina concinna (Alder & Hancock, 1864)
- Doris cornuta Rathke, 1806: synonym of Polycera quadrilineata (O. F. Müller, 1776)
- Doris coronata Gmelin, 1791: synonym of Doto coronata (Gmelin, 1791)
- Doris crucis Ørsted in Mörch, 1863: synonym of Discodoris crucis (Ørsted in Mörch, 1863) (nomen dubium)
- Doris cruenta Quoy & Gaimard, 1832: synonym of Platydoris cruenta (Quoy & Gaimard, 1832)
- Doris debilis Pease, 1871: synonym of Dendrodoris nigra (Stimpson, 1855)
- Doris decora Pease, 1860: synonym of Goniobranchus decorus (Pease, 1860)
- Doris delicata Abraham, 1877: synonym of Tyrinna delicata (Abraham, 1877)
- Doris denisoni Angas, 1864: synonym of Dendrodoris krusensternii (Gray, 1850)
- Doris depressa Alder & Hancock, 1842: synonym of Onchidoris depressa (Alder & Hancock, 1842)
- Doris derelicta P. Fischer, 1867: synonym of Doris verrucosa Linnaeus, 1758
- Doris diaphana Alder & Hancock, 1845: synonym of Onchidoris muricata (O. F. Müller, 1776)
- Doris dorsalis Gould, 1852: synonym of Mexichromis lemniscata (Quoy & Gaimard, 1832)
- Doris echinata Pease, 1860: synonym of Atagema echinata (Pease, 1860)
- Doris elegans Cantraine, 1835: synonym of Felimare picta (Schultz in Philippi, 1836)
- Doris elegantula Philippi, 1844: synonym of Felimida elegantula (Philippi, 1844)
- Doris ellioti Alder & Hancock, 1864: synonym of Platydoris ellioti (Alder & Hancock, 1864)
- Doris elongata Thompson W., 1840: synonym of Goniodoris nodosa (Montagu, 1808)
- Doris eolida Quoy & Gaimard, 1832: synonym of Okenia eolida (Quoy & Gaimard, 1832)
- Doris eubalia Fischer P., 1872: synonym of Doris sticta (Iredale & O'Donoghue, 1923)
- Doris fasciculata Gmelin, 1791: synonym of Fiona pinnata (Eschscholtz, 1831)
- Doris fidelis Kelaart, 1858: synonym of Goniobranchus fidelis (Kelaart, 1858)
- Doris fimbriata Delle Chiaje, 1841: synonym of Kaloplocamus ramosus (Cantraine, 1835)
- Doris flammulatus Quoy & Gaimard, 1832: synonym of Hexabranchus sanguineus (Rüppell & Leuckart, 1830)
- Doris flava Montagu, 1804: synonym of Polycera quadrilineata (O. F. Müller, 1776)
- Doris flavipes Leuckart, 1828: synonym of Doris pseudoargus Rapp, 1827
- Doris flemingi Forbes, 1838: synonym of Acanthodoris pilosa (Abildgaard in Müller, 1789)
- Doris flemingii Forbes, 1838: synonym of Acanthodoris pilosa (Abildgaard in Müller, 1789)
- Doris fontainei Hupé, 1854: synonym of Doris fontainii d'Orbigny, 1837
- Doris formosa Alder & Hancock, 1864: synonym of Platydoris formosa (Alder & Hancock, 1864)
- Doris fragilis Alder & Hancock, 1864: synonym of Sebadoris fragilis (Alder & Hancock, 1864)
- Doris fumata Rüppell & Leuckart, 1830: synonym of Dendrodoris fumata (Rüppell & Leuckart, 1830)
- Doris funebris Kelaart, 1859: synonym of Jorunna funebris (Kelaart, 1859)
- Doris fusca Müller, 1776: synonym of Onchidoris bilamellata (Linnaeus, 1767)
- Doris glabella Bergh, 1907: synonym of Discodoris glabella (Bergh, 1907)
- Doris glabra Friele & Hansen, 1876: synonym of Cadlina glabra (Friele & Hansen, 1876)
- Doris gleniei Kelaart, 1858: synonym of Goniobranchus gleniei (Kelaart, 1858)
- Doris gracilis Rapp, 1827: synonym of Felimare villafranca (Risso, 1818)
- Doris grandiflora Rapp, 1827: synonym of Dendrodoris grandiflora (Rapp, 1827)
- Doris grandiflora Pease, 1860: synonym of Hoplodoris grandiflora (Pease, 1860)
- Doris grandifloriger Abraham, 1877: synonym of Hoplodoris grandiflora (Pease, 1860)
- Doris granosa Bergh, 1907 is a synonym of Doris verrucosa Linnaeus, 1758
- Doris granulata Ehrenberg, 1831: synonym of Sebadoris fragilis (Alder & Hancock, 1864)
- Doris grisea Kelaart, 1858: synonym of Dendrodoris grisea (Kelaart, 1858)
- Doris guttata Risso, 1826: synonym of Dendrodoris grandiflora (Rapp, 1827)
- Doris hispida d'Orbigny, 1834: synonym of Diaulula hispida (d'Orbigny, 1834)
- Doris humberti Kelaart, 1858: synonym of Glossodoris humberti (Kelaart, 1858)
- Doris illuminata Gould, 1841: synonym of Palio dubia (M. Sars, 1829)
- Doris impudica Rüppell & Leuckart, 1830: synonym of Gymnodoris impudica (Rüppell & Leuckart, 1830)
- Doris incii Gray, 1850: synonym of Halgerda willeyi Eliot, 1904
- Doris inconspicua Alder & Hancock, 1851: synonym of Onchidoris inconspicua (Alder & Hancock, 1851)
- Doris infravalvata Abraham, 1877: synonym of Platydoris argo (Linnaeus, 1767)
- Doris infucata Rüppell & Leuckart, 1830: synonym of Hypselodoris infucata (Rüppell & Leuckart, 1830)
- Doris intecta Kelaart, 1859: synonym of Atagema intecta (Kelaart, 1859)
- Doris johnstoni Alder & Hancock, 1845: synonym of Jorunna tomentosa (Cuvier, 1804)
- Doris krohni Vérany, 1846: synonym of Felimida krohni (Vérany, 1846)
- Doris labifera Abraham, 1877: synonym of Montereina labifera (Abraham, 1877)
- Doris lacera Cuvier, 1804: synonym of Hexabranchus sanguineus (Rüppell & Leuckart, 1830)
- Doris laevis Linnaeus, 1767: synonym of Cadlina laevis (Linnaeus, 1767)
- Doris laevis Gray M.E., 1850: synonym of Acanthodoris pilosa (Abildgaard in Müller, 1789)
- Doris lanuginata Abraham, 1877: synonym of Alloiodoris lanuginata (Abraham, 1877)
- Doris lemniscata Quoy & Gaimard, 1832: synonym of Mexichromis lemniscata (Quoy & Gaimard, 1832)
- Doris leuckarti Delle Chiaje, 1841: synonym of Doris pseudoargus Rapp, 1827
- Doris leuckartii Delle Chiaje, 1841: synonym of Doris pseudoargus Rapp, 1827
- Doris lilacina Gould, 1852: synonym of Tayuva lilacina (Gould, 1852)
- Doris limbata Cuvier, 1804: synonym of Dendrodoris limbata (Cuvier, 1804)
- Doris lineolata van Hasselt, 1824: synonym of Chromodoris lineolata (van Hasselt, 1824)
- Doris longicornis Montagu, 1808: synonym of Facelina auriculata (Müller, 1776)
- Doris loveni Alder & Hancock, 1862: synonym of Adalaria loveni (Alder & Hancock, 1862)
- Doris luctuosa Cheeseman, 1882: synonym of Aphelodoris luctuosa (Cheeseman, 1882)
- Doris lugubris Ehrenberg, 1828: synonym of Dendrodoris limbata (Cuvier, 1804)
- Doris lugubris (Gravenhorst, 1831): synonym of Doris lugubris Ehrenberg, 1828
- Doris luteocincta M. Sars, 1870: synonym of Diaphorodoris luteocincta (M. Sars, 1870)
- Doris luteorosea Rapp, 1827: synonym of Felimida luteorosea (Rapp, 1827)
- Doris lutescens Delle Chiaje in Verany, 1846: synonym of Felimare picta (Schultz in Philippi, 1836)
- Doris maccarthyi Kelaart, 1859: synonym of Doriprismatica atromarginata (Cuvier, 1804)
- Doris maculata Montagu, 1804: synonym of Doto maculata (Montagu, 1804)
- Doris maculata Garstang, 1896: synonym of Doris sticta (Iredale & O'Donoghue, 1923)
- Doris magnifica Quoy & Gaimard, 1832: synonym of Chromodoris magnifica (Quoy & Gaimard, 1832)
- Doris marginata Montagu, 1804: synonym of Cadlina laevis (Linnaeus, 1767)
- Doris marginata Pease, 1860: synonym of Goniobranchus verrieri (Crosse, 1875)
- Doris marginata Quoy & Gaimard, 1832: synonym of Hexabranchus sanguineus (Rüppell & Leuckart, 1830)
- Doris marginatus Quoy & Gaimard, 1832: synonym of Hexabranchus sanguineus (Rüppell & Leuckart, 1830)
- Doris mariei Crosse, 1875: synonym of Dendrodoris nigra (Stimpson, 1855)
- Doris marplatensis Franceschi, 1928: synonym of Polycera quadrilineata (O. F. Müller, 1776)
- Doris maura Forbes, 1840: synonym of Aegires punctilucens (d'Orbigny, 1837)
- Doris mera Alder & Hancock, 1844: synonym of Archidoris pseudoargus (Rapp, 1827): synonym of Doris pseudoargus Rapp, 1827
- Doris millegrana Alder & Hancock, 1854: synonym of Aporodoris millegrana (Alder & Hancock, 1854)
- Doris muricata O. F. Müller, 1776: synonym of Onchidoris muricata (O. F. Müller, 1776)
- Doris murrea Abraham, 1877: synonym of Peltodoris murrea (Abraham, 1877)
- Doris muscula Abraham, 1877: synonym of Rostanga muscula (Abraham, 1877)
- Doris nardi Vérany, 1846: synonym of Felimare picta (Schultz in Philippi, 1836)
- Doris nardii Vérany, 1846: synonym of Felimare picta (Schultz in Philippi, 1836)
- Doris natalensis Krauss, 1848: synonym of Discodoris natalensis (Krauss, 1848)
- Doris nigra Stimpson, 1855: synonym of Dendrodoris nigra (Stimpson, 1855)
- Doris nigricans Fleming, 1820: synonym of Acanthodoris pilosa (Abildgaard in Müller, 1789)
- Doris nigricans Otto, 1823: synonym of Dendrodoris limbata (Cuvier, 1804)
- Doris nodosa Montagu, 1808: synonym of Goniodoris nodosa (Montagu, 1808)
- Doris nodulosa Angas, 1864: synonym of Hoplodoris nodulosa (Angas, 1864)
- Doris nubilosa Pease, 1871: synonym of Sebadoris nubilosa (Pease, 1871)
- Doris oblonga Alder & Hancock, 1845: synonym of Onchidoris oblonga (Alder & Hancock, 1845)
- Doris obsoleta Rüppell & Leuckart, 1830: synonym of Goniobranchus obsoletus (Rüppell & Leuckart, 1830)
- Doris obvelata Müller O.F., 1776: synonym of Cadlina laevis (Linnaeus, 1767)
- Doris obvelata Johnston, 1838: synonym of Jorunna tomentosa (Cuvier, 1804)
- Doris odonoghuei Steinberg, 1963: synonym of Diaulula odonoghuei (Steinberg, 1963)
- Doris olivacea Verrill, 1900: unaccepted
- Doris orbignyi H. Adams & A. Adams, 1858: synonym of Montereina punctifera (Abraham, 1877)
- Doris ornata Ehrenberg, 1831: synonym of Atagema ornata (Ehrenberg, 1831)
- Doris ornata (d'Orbigny, 1837): synonym of Polycera quadrilineata (O. F. Müller, 1776)
- Doris orsinii Vérany, 1846: synonym of Felimare orsinii (Vérany, 1846)
- Doris osseosa Kelaart, 1859: synonym of Atagema osseosa (Kelaart, 1859)
- Doris pallida Rüppell & Leuckart, 1830: synonym of Glossodoris pallida (Rüppell & Leuckart, 1830)
- Doris pantherina Angas, 1864: synonym of Jorunna pantherina (Angas, 1864)
- Doris pardalis Alder & Hancock, 1864: synonym of Montereina pardalis (Alder & Hancock, 1864)
- Doris pareti Vérany, 1846: synonym of Goniodoris castanea Alder & Hancock, 1845
- Doris pasini Vérany, 1846: synonym of Felimare villafranca (Risso, 1818)
- Doris pecten Collingwood, 1881: synonym of Doris granulosa (Pease, 1860)
- Doris peculiaris Abraham, 1877: synonym of Doriopsilla peculiaris (Abraham, 1877)
- Doris pedata Montagu, 1815: synonym of Flabellina pedata (Montagu, 1815)
- Doris pellucida Risso, 1826: synonym of Cadlina pellucida (Risso, 1826)
- Doris pennigera Montagu, 1815: synonym of Thecacera pennigera (Montagu, 1815)
- Doris peregrina Gmelin, 1791: synonym of Cratena peregrina (Gmelin, 1791)
- Doris perplexa Bergh, 1907: synonym of Discodoris perplexa (Bergh, 1907)
- Doris peruviana d'Orbigny, 1837: synonym of Baptodoris peruviana (d'Orbigny, 1837)
- Doris petechialis Gould, 1852: synonym of Goniobranchus petechialis (Gould, 1852)
- Doris philippii Weinkauff, 1873: synonym of Jorunna tomentosa (Cuvier, 1804)
- Doris picta Schultz in Philippi, 1836: synonym of Felimare picta (Schultz in Philippi, 1836)
- Doris picturata Ehrenberg, 1831: synonym of Hypselodoris picturata (Ehrenberg, 1831)
- Doris pilosa Abildgaard in Müller, 1789: synonym of Acanthodoris pilosa (Abildgaard in Müller, 1789)
- Doris pinnatifida Montagu, 1804: synonym of Doto pinnatifida (Montagu, 1804)
- Doris piraini Vérany, 1846: synonym of Felimida purpurea (Risso in Guérin, 1831)
- Doris planata Alder & Hancock, 1846: synonym of Geitodoris planata (Alder & Hancock, 1846)
- Doris planulata Stimpson, 1853: synonym of Cadlina laevis (Linnaeus, 1767)
- Doris porri Vérany, 1846: synonym of Paradoris indecora (Bergh, 1881)
- Doris preciosa Kelaart, 1858: synonym of Goniobranchus preciosus (Kelaart, 1858)
- Doris prismatica Pease, 1860: synonym of Glossodoris prismatica (Pease, 1860)
- Doris propinquata Pease, 1860: synonym of Goniobranchus vibratus (Pease, 1860)
- Doris proxima Alder & Hancock, 1854: synonym of Adalaria proxima (Alder & Hancock, 1854)
- Doris pseudida Bergh, 1907: synonym of Discodoris pseudida (Bergh, 1907)
- Doris pulchella Rüppell & Leuckart, 1830: synonym of Hypselodoris pulchella (Rüppell & Leuckart, 1830)
- Doris pulchella Aradas, 1847: synonym of Doris bicolor (Bergh, 1884)
- Doris pulcherrima Cantraine, 1835: synonym of Felimare villafranca (Risso, 1818)
- Doris punctata d'Orbigny, 1839: synonym of Montereina punctifera (Abraham, 1877)
- Doris punctifera Abraham, 1877: synonym of Montereina punctifera (Abraham, 1877)
- Doris punctulifera Bergh, 1874: synonym of Chromodoris aspersa (Gould, 1852)
- Doris punctuolata d'Orbigny, 1837: synonym of Diaulula punctuolata (d'Orbigny, 1837)
- Doris purpurea Risso in Guérin, 1831: synonym of Felimida purpurea (Risso in Guérin, 1831)
- Doris pusilla Alder & Hancock, 1845: synonym of Onchidoris pusilla (Alder & Hancock, 1845)
- Doris pustulata Abraham, 1877: synonym of Hoplodoris nodulosa (Angas, 1864)
- Doris pustulosa Cuvier, 1804: synonym of Ceratosoma pustulosum (Cuvier, 1804)
- Doris quadrangulata Jeffreys, 1869: synonym of Acanthodoris pilosa (Abildgaard in Müller, 1789)
- Doris quadricolor Rüppell & Leuckart, 1830: synonym of Chromodoris quadricolor (Rüppell & Leuckart, 1830)
- Doris quadricornis Montagu, 1815: synonym of Okenia aspersa (Alder & Hancock, 1845)
- Doris quadrilineata O. F. Müller, 1776: synonym of Polycera quadrilineata (O. F. Müller, 1776)
- Doris radiata Gmelin, 1791: synonym of Glaucus atlanticus Forster, 1777
- Doris ramosa Cantraine, 1835: synonym of Kaloplocamus ramosus (Cantraine, 1835)
- Doris rappi Cantraine, 1841: synonym of Dendrodoris limbata (Cuvier, 1804)
- Doris raripilosa Abraham, 1877: synonym of Asteronotus raripilosus (Abraham, 1877)
- Doris repanda Alder & Hancock, 1842: synonym of Cadlina laevis (Linnaeus, 1767)
- Doris reticulata Quoy & Gaimard, 1832: synonym of Goniobranchus reticulatus (Quoy & Gaimard, 1832)
- Doris reticulata Schultz in Philippi, 1836: synonym of Doriopsilla areolata Bergh, 1880
- Doris rocinela Leach, 1852: synonym of Acanthodoris pilosa (Abildgaard in Müller, 1789)
- Doris rubicunda Cheeseman, 1881: synonym of Rostanga muscula (Abraham, 1877)
- Doris rubra Kelaart, 1858: synonym of Dendrodoris fumata (Rüppell & Leuckart, 1830)
- Doris rubra Risso, 1818: synonym of Rostanga rubra (Risso, 1818)
- Doris rubrilineata Pease, 1871: synonym of Dendrodoris nigra (Stimpson, 1855)
- Doris sandiegensis J. G. Cooper, 1863: synonym of Diaulula sandiegensis (J. G. Cooper, 1863)
- Doris sandwichensis Eydoux & Souleyet, 1852: synonym of Hexabranchus sanguineus (Rüppell & Leuckart, 1830)
- Doris sanguinea Rüppell & Leuckart, 1830: synonym of Hexabranchus sanguineus (Rüppell & Leuckart, 1830)
- Doris scacchi Delle Chiaje, 1830: synonym of Felimare picta (Schultz in Philippi, 1836)
- Doris schembrii Vérany, 1846: synonym of Doris pseudoargus Rapp, 1827
- Doris schmeltziana Bergh, 1875: synonym of Discodoris schmeltziana (Bergh, 1875)
- Doris schultzii Delle Chiaje, 1841: synonym of Felimare villafranca (Risso, 1818)
- Doris setigera Rapp, 1827: synonym of Dendrodoris limbata (Cuvier, 1804)
- Doris sibirica Aurivillius, 1887: synonym of Calycidoris guentheri Abraham, 1876
- Doris similis Alder & Hancock, 1842: synonym of Acanthodoris pilosa (Abildgaard in Müller, 1789)
- Doris sinuata van Hasselt, 1824: synonym of Miamira sinuata (van Hasselt, 1824)
- Doris sismondae Vérany, 1846: synonym of Dendrodoris limbata (Cuvier, 1804)
- Doris sordida Quoy & Gaimard, 1832: synonym of Sebadoris fragilis (Alder & Hancock, 1864)
- Doris sordida Pease, 1871: synonym of Dendrodoris nigra (Stimpson, 1855)
- Doris sordida Rüppell & Leuckart, 1830: synonym of Sebadoris fragilis (Alder & Hancock, 1864)
- Doris sordidata Abraham, 1877: synonym of Sebadoris fragilis (Alder & Hancock, 1864)
- Doris sparsa Alder & Hancock, 1846: synonym of Onchidoris sparsa (Alder & Hancock, 1846)
- Doris speciosa Abraham, 1877: synonym of Platydoris ellioti (Alder & Hancock, 1864)
- Doris sponsa Ehrenberg, 1831: synonym of Chromodoris sponsa (Ehrenberg, 1831)
- Doris stellata Gmelin, 1791: synonym of Acanthodoris pilosa (Abildgaard in Müller, 1789)
- Doris stragulata Abraham, 1877: synonym of Sebadoris fragilis (Alder & Hancock, 1864)
- Doris striata Kelaart, 1858: synonym of Platydoris striata (Kelaart, 1858)
- Doris sublaevis Thompson, 1840: synonym of Acanthodoris pilosa (Abildgaard in Müller, 1789)
- Doris subquadrata Alder & Hancock, 1845: synonym of Acanthodoris pilosa (Abildgaard in Müller, 1789)
- Doris subtumida Abraham, 1877: synonym of Platydoris argo (Linnaeus, 1767)
- Doris sumptuosa Gould, 1852: synonym of Hexabranchus sanguineus (Rüppell & Leuckart, 1830)
- Doris superba Gould, 1852: synonym of Hexabranchus sanguineus (Rüppell & Leuckart, 1830)
- Doris tabulata Abraham, 1877: synonym of Platydoris tabulata (Abraham, 1877)
- Doris tenera O. G. Costa: synonym of Felimare villafranca (Risso, 1818)
- Doris tennentana Kelaart, 1859: synonym of Goniobranchus tennentanus (Kelaart, 1859)
- Doris testudinaria Risso, 1826: synonym of Geitodoris planata (Alder & Hancock, 1846)
- Doris tinctoria Rüppell & Leuckart, 1830: synonym of Goniobranchus tinctorius (Rüppell & Leuckart, 1830)
- Doris tomentosa Cuvier, 1804: synonym of Jorunna tomentosa (Cuvier, 1804)
- Doris tricolor Cantraine, 1835: synonym of Felimare tricolor (Cantraine, 1835)
- Doris trifida J.E. Gray, 1850: synonym of Ceratosoma trilobatum (J.E. Gray, 1827)
- Doris trilobata J.E. Gray, 1827: synonym of Ceratosoma trilobatum (J.E. Gray, 1827)
- Doris tristis Alder & Hancock, 1864: synonym of Atagema tristis (Alder & Hancock, 1864)
- Doris tuberculosa Quoy & Gaimard, 1832: synonym of Dendrodoris tuberculosa (Quoy & Gaimard, 1832)
- Doris ulidiana Thompson W., 1845: synonym of Onchidoris muricata (O. F. Müller, 1776)
- Doris valenciennesi Cantraine, 1841: synonym of Felimare picta (Schultz in Philippi, 1836)
- Doris varia Abraham, 1877: synonym of Aphelodoris varia (Abraham, 1877)
- Doris variabilis Angas, 1864: synonym of Aphelodoris varia (Abraham, 1877)
- Doris variolata d'Orbigny, 1837: synonym of Diaulula variolata (d'Orbigny, 1837)
- Doris vermicelli Gould, 1852: synonym of Diaulula variolata (d'Orbigny, 1837)
- Doris vermigera Turton, 1807: synonym of Aeolidia papillosa (Linnaeus, 1761)
- Doris vestita Abraham, 1877: synonym of Diaulula punctuolata (d'Orbigny, 1837)
- Doris vibrata Pease, 1860: synonym of Goniobranchus vibratus (Pease, 1860)
- Doris villae Vérany, 1846: synonym of Felimare villafranca (Risso, 1818)
- Doris villafranca Risso, 1818: synonym of Felimare villafranca (Risso, 1818)
- Doris villosa Alder & Hancock, 1864: synonym of Thordisa villosa (Alder & Hancock, 1864)
- Doris virescens Risso, 1826: synonym of Dendrodoris limbata (Cuvier, 1804)
- Doris xantholeuca Ehrenberg, 1831: synonym of Glossodoris pallida (Rüppell & Leuckart, 1830)
- Doris zetlandica Alder & Hancock, 1854: synonym of Aldisa zetlandica (Alder & Hancock, 1854)
