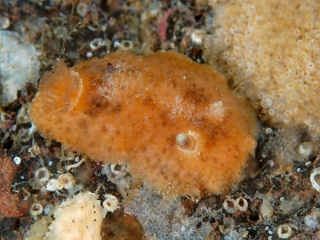
- Doris tricolor, at 4 m, Osezaki, Japan

Scientific classification
- Kingdom: Animalia
- Phylum: Mollusca
- Class: Gastropoda
- Order: Nudibranchia
- Family: Dorididae
- Genus: Doris
- Species: D. tricolor

Binomial name
- Doris tricolor (Baba, 1938)

Synonyms
- Neodoris tricolor Baba, 1938

= Doris tricolor =

Species of gastropod

Doris tricolor is a species of sea slug, a dorid nudibranch, a marine gastropod mollusc in the family Dorididae.

== Distribution ==
This species was described from Japan. It was later redescribed and compared with Doris sugashimae. It has been reported from 2 m depth at Kazino hama, Jogashima, Miura Peninsula.
