= Doris ilo =

Scientific classification
- Kingdom: Animalia
- Phylum: Mollusca
- Class: Gastropoda
- Order: Nudibranchia
- Family: Dorididae
- Genus: Doris
- Species: D. ilo

Binomial name
- Doris ilo (Er. Marcus, 1955)

Synonyms
- Siraius ilo Er. Marcus, 1955

Species of gastropod

Doris ilo is a species of sea slug, a dorid nudibranch, a marine gastropod mollusc in the family Dorididae.

== Distribution ==
This species was described from the intertidal at the Island of São Sebastiao, São Paulo, Brazil.
