= Doris falklandica =

Scientific classification
- Kingdom: Animalia
- Phylum: Mollusca
- Class: Gastropoda
- Order: Nudibranchia
- Family: Dorididae
- Genus: Doris
- Species: D. falklandica

Binomial name
- Doris falklandica (Eliot, 1907)

Synonyms
- Austrodoris falklandica (Eliot, 1907); Staurodoris falklandica Eliot, 1907

Species of gastropod

Doris falklandica is a species of sea slug, a dorid nudibranch, a marine gastropod mollusc in the family Dorididae.

== Distribution ==
This species was described from one specimen collected by Mr Valentine in the Falkland Islands.
