= Doris marmorata =

Scientific classification
- Kingdom: Animalia
- Phylum: Mollusca
- Class: Gastropoda
- Order: Nudibranchia
- Family: Dorididae
- Genus: Doris
- Species: D. marmorata

Binomial name
- Doris marmorata Risso, 1818

Species of gastropod

Doris marmorata is a species of sea slug, a dorid nudibranch, a marine gastropod mollusc in the family Dorididae.

== Distribution ==
This species was described from shallow water, beneath rocks covered with algae and sessile invertebrates at Nice, France.
