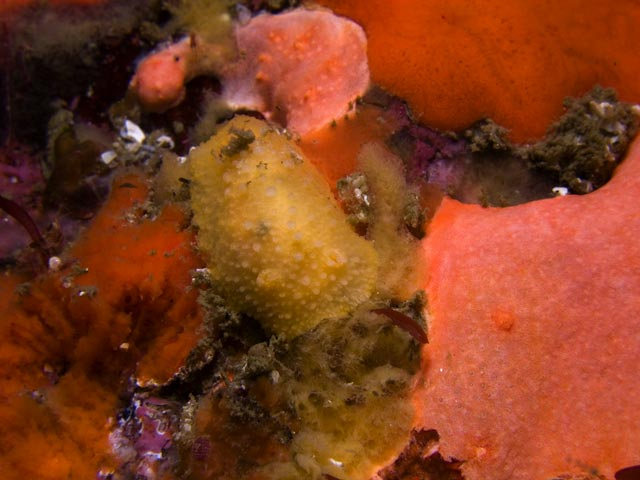
- The warty dorid on a group of sponges, head end to the bottom of the image

Scientific classification
- Kingdom: Animalia
- Phylum: Mollusca
- Class: Gastropoda
- Order: Nudibranchia
- Family: Dorididae
- Genus: Doris
- Species: D. verrucosa

Binomial name
- Doris verrucosa Linnaeus, 1758

Synonyms
- Archidoris granosa Bergh, 1907; Doridigitata verrucosa (Linnaeus, 1758); Doris biscayensis P. Fischer, 1872; Doris derelicta P. Fischer, 1867; Staurodoris bobretzkii Gadzikiewicz, 1907; Staurodoris verrucosa (Linnaeus, 1758); Staurodoris verrucosa var. mollis Eliot, 1906

= Doris verrucosa =

Species of gastropod

Doris verrucosa is a species of sea slug, a dorid nudibranch, a marine gastropod mollusk in the family Dorididae.

== Taxonomic history ==
The initial description by Linnaeus was based on older descriptions by Rumphius and was possibly not the species called by this name by subsequent taxonomists. In order to stabilise the nomenclature the name Doris verrucosa was conserved by the creation of a neotype.

== Description ==
Doris verrucosa is a yellow-brown oval nudibranch with a distinctive warty skin. It has eight gills arranged around the anus and its rhinophores are perfoliate. South African animals may reach a total length of 30 mm. The maximum recorded length is 70 mm.

== Distribution ==
This species occurs in the Mediterranean Sea and in the Atlantic Ocean off France, Spain, the United Kingdom and Ireland. It has been reported from South Africa, where it is commonly known as the Warty dorid, but this may prove to be a separate, closely related species. Records of this species from the coast of Brazil have been demonstrated to be a separate species Doris januarii.

== Ecology ==
In South Africa the warty dorid feeds on the crumb-of-bread sponge, Hymeniacidon cf. perlevis, which it closely resembles in colour. Its egg mass is a tall upright collar of several complete whorls. It has been recorded from the intertidal zone to 14 m depth.
