= Doris hayeki =

Scientific classification
- Kingdom: Animalia
- Phylum: Mollusca
- Class: Gastropoda
- Order: Nudibranchia
- Family: Dorididae
- Genus: Doris
- Species: D. hayeki

Binomial name
- Doris hayeki Ortea, 1998

Species of gastropod

Doris hayeki is a species of sea slug, a dorid nudibranch, a marine gastropod mollusc in the family Dorididae.

== Distribution ==
This species was described from the intertidal zone at Serra Negra and 2 m depth at Sal-Rei on Sal, Cape Verde.
