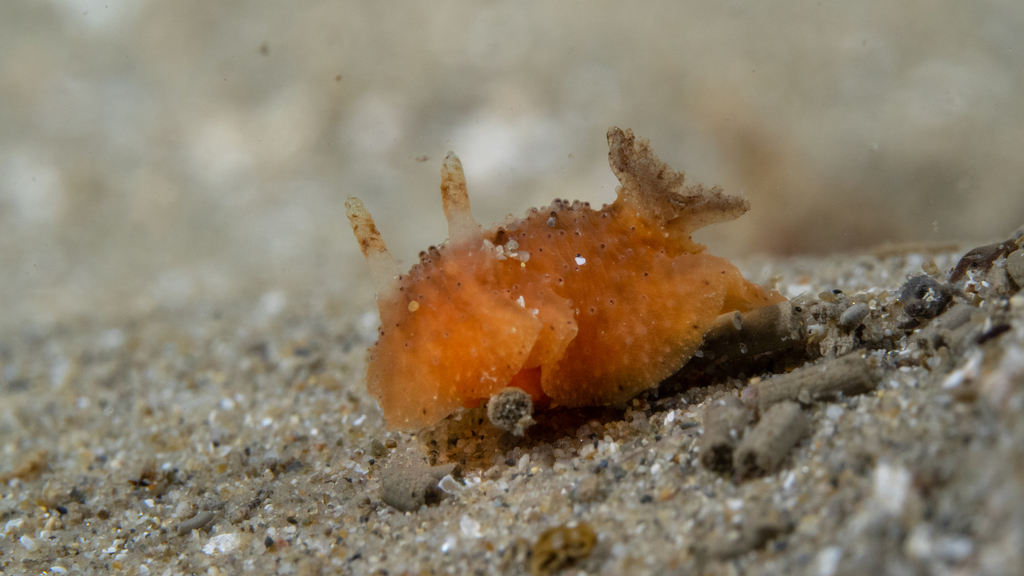

Scientific classification
- Kingdom: Animalia
- Phylum: Mollusca
- Class: Gastropoda
- Order: Nudibranchia
- Family: Dorididae
- Genus: Doris
- Species: D. cameroni

Binomial name
- Doris cameroni (Allan, 1947)

Synonyms
- Archidoris cameroni Allan, 1947

= Doris cameroni =

Species of gastropod

Doris cameroni is a species of sea slug, a dorid nudibranch, a marine gastropod mollusk in the family Dorididae.

== Distribution ==
This species was described from New South Wales, Australia. It has been reported from New South Wales to South Australia.
