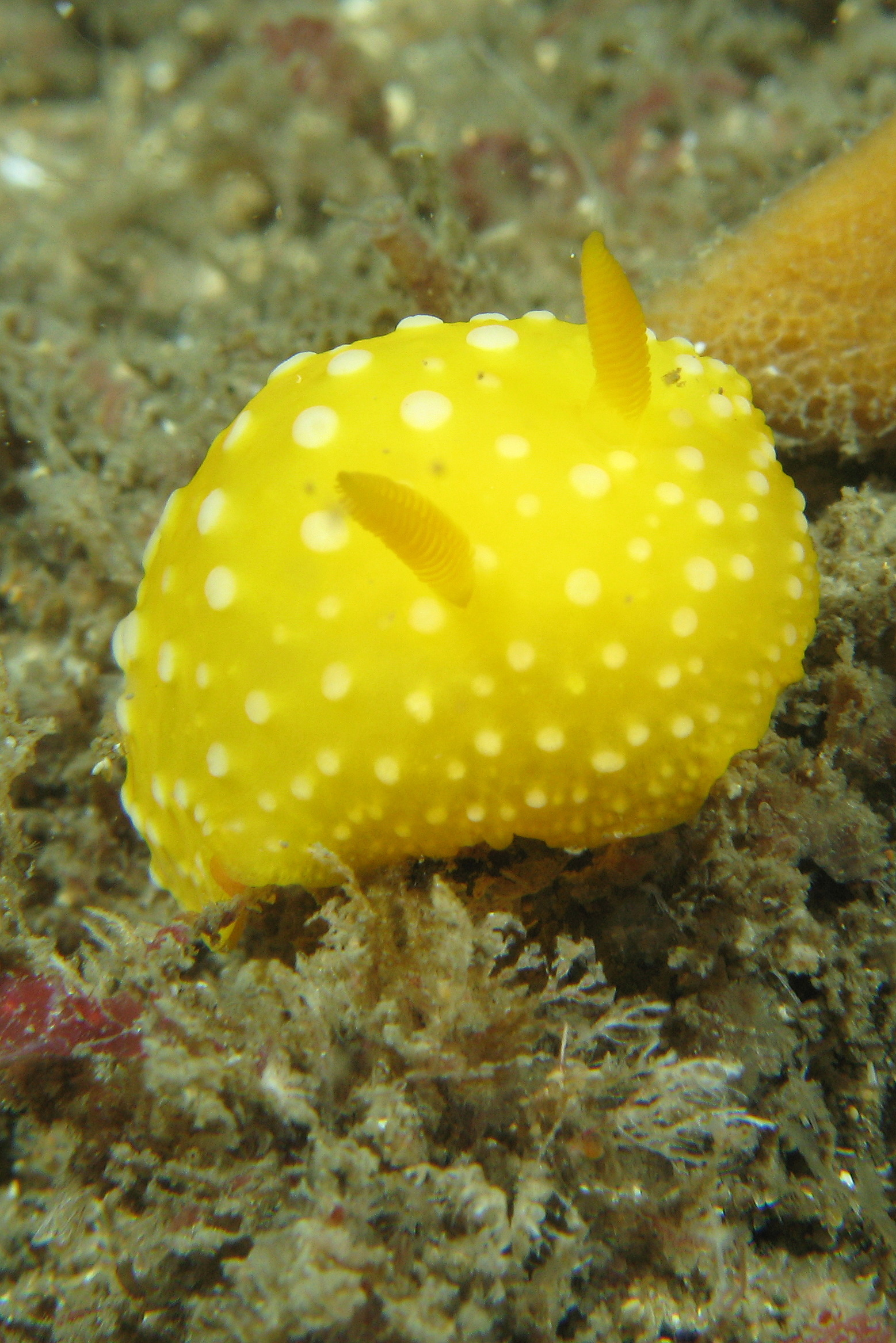

Scientific classification
- Kingdom: Animalia
- Phylum: Mollusca
- Class: Gastropoda
- Order: Nudibranchia
- Family: Dorididae
- Genus: Doris
- Species: D. chrysoderma

Binomial name
- Doris chrysoderma (Angas, 1864)

Synonyms
- Neodoris chrysoderma (Angas, 1864)

= Doris chrysoderma =

Species of gastropod

Doris chrysoderma is a species of sea slug, a dorid nudibranch, a shell-less marine gastropod mollusk in the family Dorididae.

== Distribution ==
This species has been found in temperate waters in Southern Australia ranging from New South Wales to Western Australia.

The type locality is Port Jackson.

== Description ==
This sublittoral species has a background colour ranging from bright yellow to a fairly pale cream. D. chrysoderma always has rounded white pustules. This species grows to approximately 30 mm in length.
