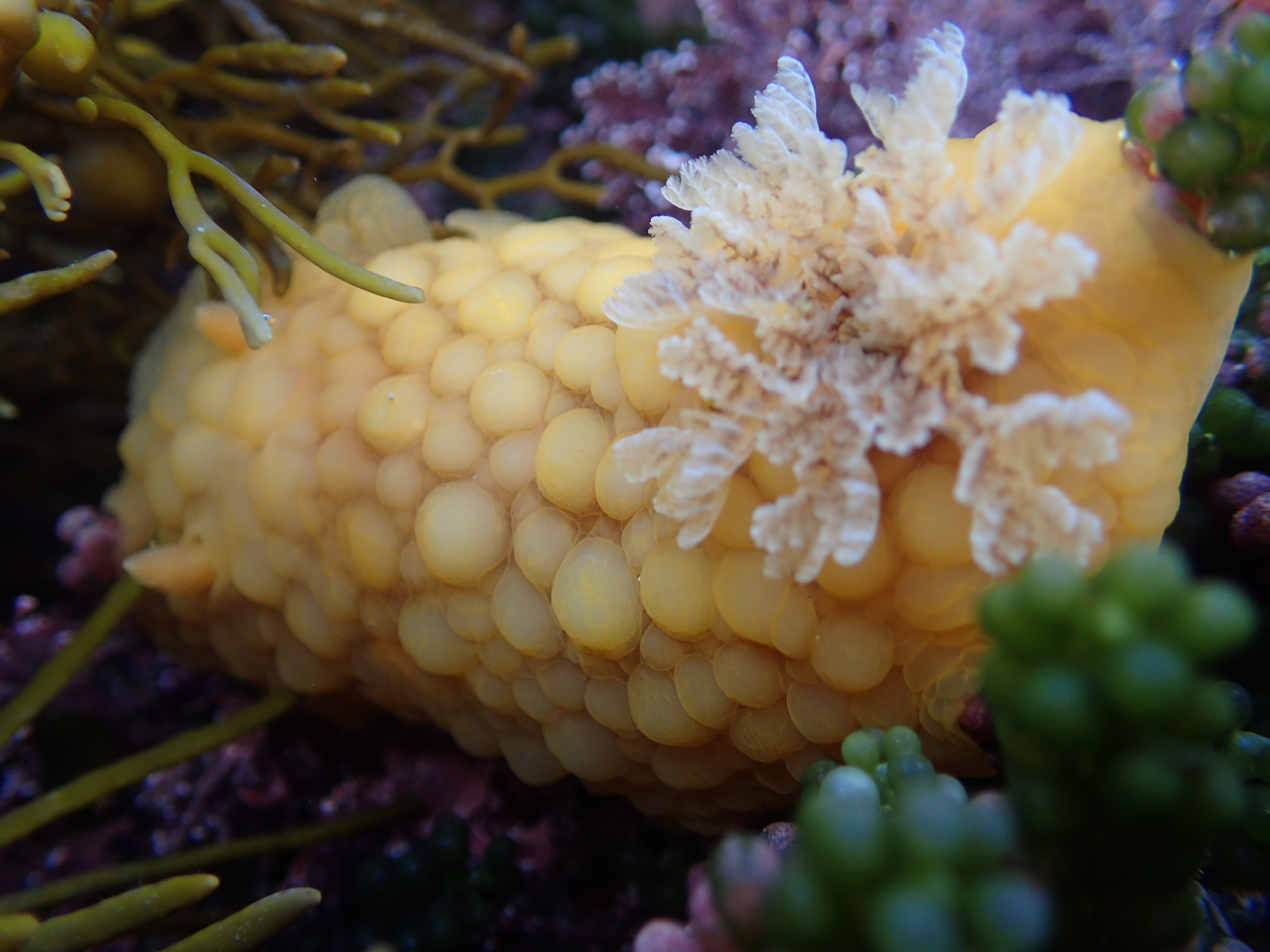

Scientific classification
- Kingdom: Animalia
- Phylum: Mollusca
- Class: Gastropoda
- Order: Nudibranchia
- Family: Dorididae
- Genus: Doris
- Species: D. wellingtonensis

Binomial name
- Doris wellingtonensis Abraham, 1877

Synonyms
- Archidoris wellingtonensis (Abraham, 1877)

= Doris wellingtonensis =

Species of gastropod

Doris wellingtonensis is a species of sea slug, a dorid nudibranch, a marine gastropod mollusk in the family Dorididae.

== Distribution ==
This species was described from Wellington, New Zealand. It has been reported from Tasmania and Victoria, Australia.
