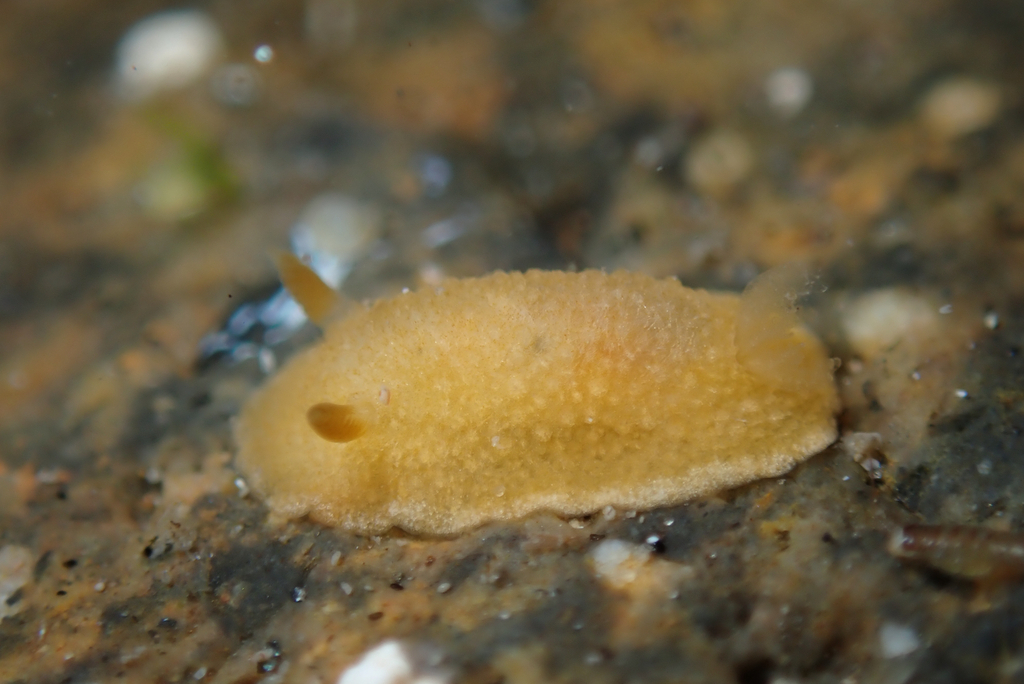

Scientific classification
- Kingdom: Animalia
- Phylum: Mollusca
- Class: Gastropoda
- Order: Nudibranchia
- Family: Dorididae
- Genus: Doris
- Species: D. pickensi

Binomial name
- Doris pickensi Er. Marcus & Ev. Marcus, 1967

= Doris pickensi =

Species of gastropod

Doris pickensi is a species of sea slug, a dorid nudibranch, a marine gastropod mollusc in the family Dorididae.

== Distribution ==
This species was described from Puerto Lobos and Puerto Peñasco, Sonora, Mexico, in the Gulf of California where they were reported to be "fairly common under boulders in the intertidal zone". It has been redescribed with specimens from Costa Rica.
