= Doris viridis =

Scientific classification
- Kingdom: Animalia
- Phylum: Mollusca
- Class: Gastropoda
- Order: Nudibranchia
- Family: Dorididae
- Genus: Doris
- Species: D. viridis

Binomial name
- Doris viridis (Pease, 1861)

Synonyms
- Doriopsis viridis Pease, 1861

Species of gastropod

Doris viridis is a species of sea slug, a dorid nudibranch, a marine gastropod mollusk in the family Dorididae.

== Distribution ==
This species was described from Tahiti. It has been reported from the Hawaiian Islands and Red Beach, Hontou (East coast), Okinawa, Japan.
