= Doris fulva =

Scientific classification
- Kingdom: Animalia
- Phylum: Mollusca
- Class: Gastropoda
- Order: Nudibranchia
- Family: Dorididae
- Genus: Doris
- Species: D. fulva

Binomial name
- Doris fulva (Eliot, 1907)

Synonyms
- Archidoris fulva Eliot, 1907

Species of gastropod

Doris fulva is a species of sea slug, a dorid nudibranch, a marine gastropod mollusc in the family Dorididae.

== Distribution ==
This species was described from Australia.
