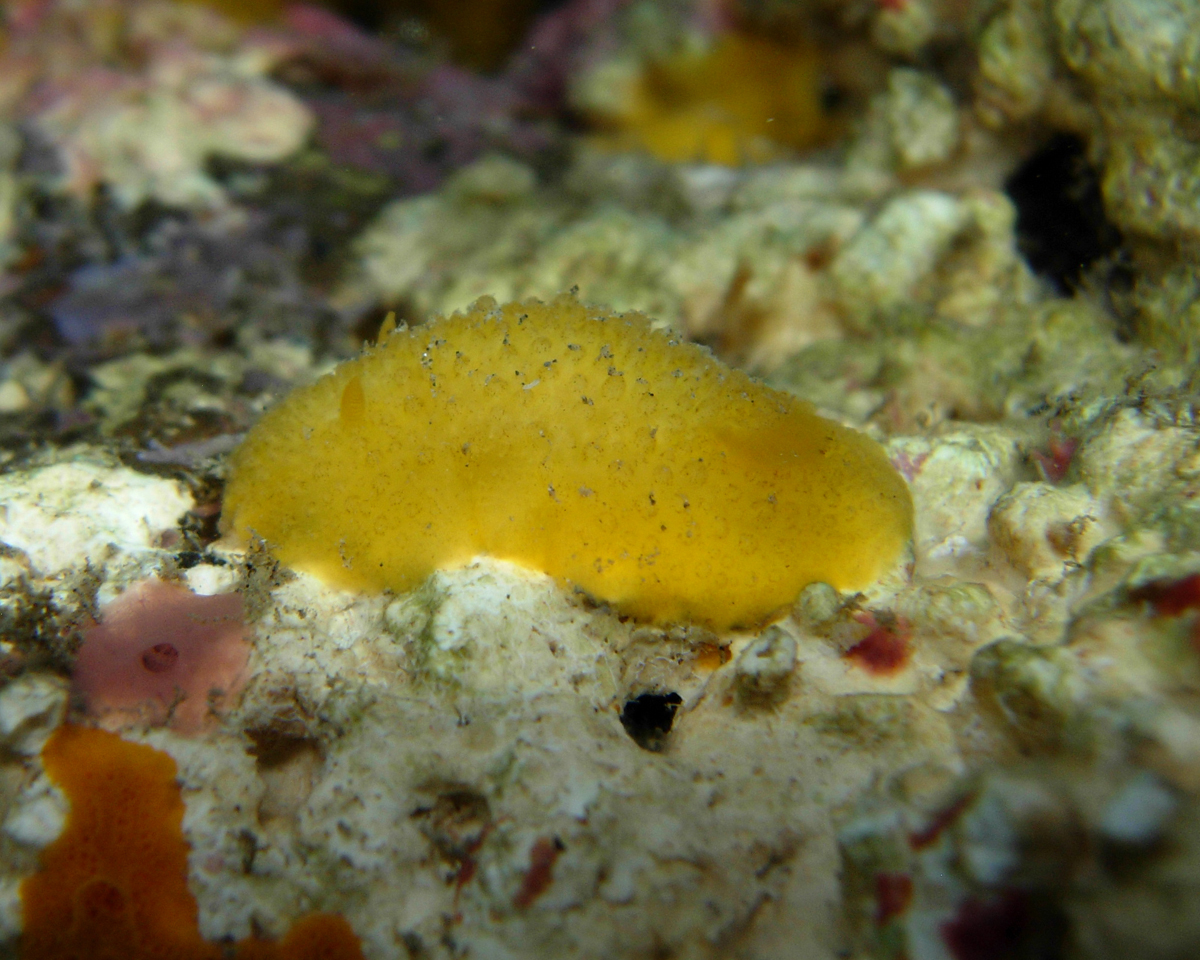

Scientific classification
- Kingdom: Animalia
- Phylum: Mollusca
- Class: Gastropoda
- Order: Nudibranchia
- Family: Dorididae
- Genus: Doriopsis; Pease, 1860

Synonyms
- Ctenodoris Eliot, 1907

= Doriopsis =

Genus of gastropods

Doriopsis is a genus of sea slugs, specifically dorid nudibranchs. These animals are marine gastropod molluscs in the family Dorididae.

== Species ==
Species within the genus Doriopsis include:

- Doriopsis granulosa (Pease, 1860)
- Doriopsis pecten Collingwood, 1881

Species brought into synonymy

- Doriopsis jousseaumei Vayssière, 1912: synonym of Dendrodoris jousseaumei (Vayssière, 1912)
