= Doris nanula =

Scientific classification
- Kingdom: Animalia
- Phylum: Mollusca
- Class: Gastropoda
- Order: Nudibranchia
- Family: Dorididae
- Genus: Doris
- Species: D. nanula

Binomial name
- Doris nanula (Bergh, 1904)

Synonyms
- Archidoris nanula Bergh, 1904

Species of gastropod

Doris nanula is a species of sea slug, a dorid nudibranch, a marine gastropod mollusc in the family Dorididae.

== Distribution ==
This species was described from Port Chalmers in Otago Harbour, New Zealand.
