= Doris atypica =

Scientific classification
- Kingdom: Animalia
- Phylum: Mollusca
- Class: Gastropoda
- Order: Nudibranchia
- Family: Dorididae
- Genus: Doris
- Species: D. atypica

Binomial name
- Doris atypica (Eliot, 1906)

Synonyms
- Staurodoris atypica Eliot, 1906

Species of gastropod

Doris atypica is a species of sea slug, a dorid nudibranch, a marine gastropod mollusk in the family Dorididae.

== Distribution ==
This species occurs off the Cape Verde Islands.
