= Doris flabellifera =

Scientific classification
- Kingdom: Animalia
- Phylum: Mollusca
- Class: Gastropoda
- Order: Nudibranchia
- Family: Dorididae
- Genus: Doris
- Species: D. flabellifera

Binomial name
- Doris flabellifera (Cheeseman, 1881)

Synonyms
- Doriopsis flabellifera (Cheeseman, 1881)

Species of gastropod

Doris flabellifera is a species of sea slug, a dorid nudibranch, a marine gastropod mollusk in the family Dorididae.

== Distribution ==
This species was described from New Zealand.
