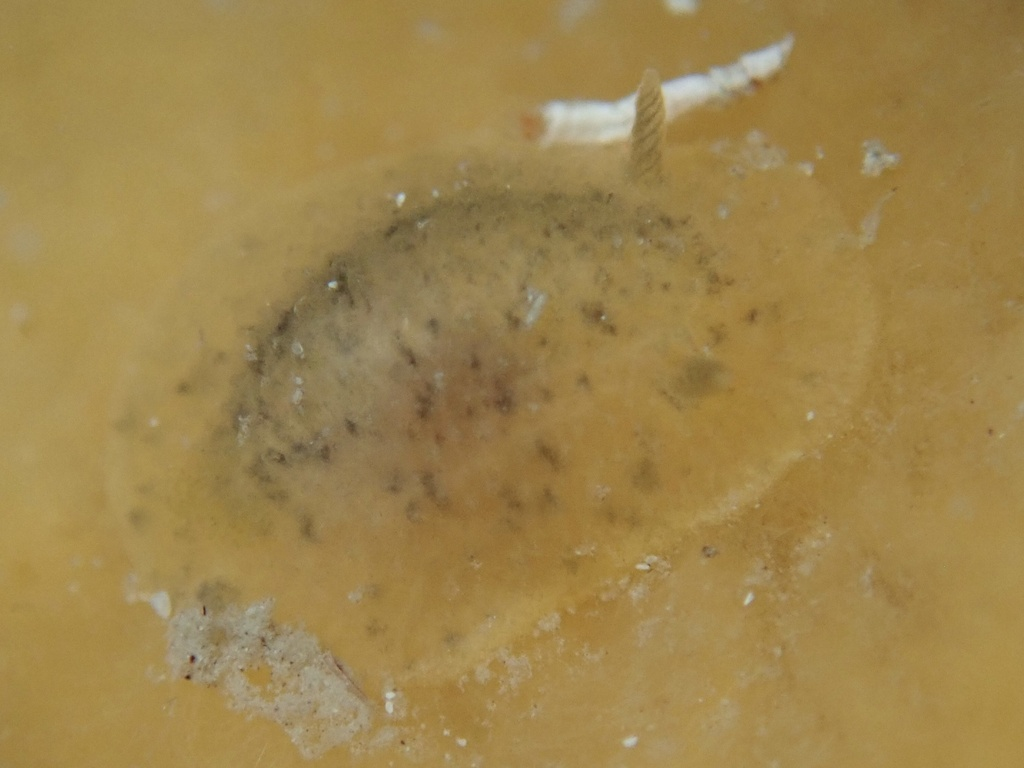

Scientific classification
- Kingdom: Animalia
- Phylum: Mollusca
- Class: Gastropoda
- Order: Nudibranchia
- Family: Dorididae
- Genus: Doris
- Species: D. bovena

Binomial name
- Doris bovena Er. Marcus, 1955

= Doris bovena =

Species of gastropod

Doris bovena is a species of sea slug, a dorid nudibranch, a marine gastropod mollusk in the family Dorididae.

== Distribution ==
This species was described from the Island of São Sebastiao, São Paulo, Brazil.
