= Doris bicolor =

Scientific classification
- Kingdom: Animalia
- Phylum: Mollusca
- Class: Gastropoda
- Order: Nudibranchia
- Family: Dorididae
- Genus: Doris
- Species: D. bicolor

Binomial name
- Doris bicolor (Bergh, 1884)

Synonyms
- Staurodoris bicolor Bergh, 1884

Species of gastropod

Doris bicolor is a species of sea slug, a dorid nudibranch, a marine gastropod mollusk in the family Dorididae.

== Distribution ==
This species was described from Trieste, Italy.
