= Doris elegans =

Scientific classification
- Kingdom: Animalia
- Phylum: Mollusca
- Class: Gastropoda
- Order: Nudibranchia
- Family: Dorididae
- Genus: Doris
- Species: D. elegans

Binomial name
- Doris elegans Quoy & Gaimard, 1832

Species of gastropod

Doris elegans is a species of sea slug, a dorid nudibranch, a marine gastropod mollusc in the family Dorididae.

== Distribution ==
The type locality is not given and this species has not been recognised by subsequent authors.
