= Doris pseudoverrucosa =

Scientific classification
- Kingdom: Animalia
- Phylum: Mollusca
- Class: Gastropoda
- Order: Nudibranchia
- Family: Dorididae
- Genus: Doris
- Species: D. pseudoverrucosa

Binomial name
- Doris pseudoverrucosa (Ihering, 1886)

Synonyms
- Staurodoris pseudoverrucosa Ihering, 1886

Species of marine gastropod

Doris pseudoverrucosa is a species of sea slug, a dorid nudibranch, and a marine gastropod mollusc in the family Dorididae.

== Distribution ==
This species was described from Naples, Italy.

== Description ==
The description given by Hermann von Ihering is translated as follows:

It should be mentioned here that I received another dorid in Naples, which should probably also be placed within Staurodoris. I call this new species : Staurodoris pseudoverrucosa. The 32 mm long animal is externally similar to St. verrucosa, but the dorsal tubercles are conical towards the tip and basally connected by ridges, as is observed to a lesser degree in St. verrucosa. The rhinophores are surrounded by a thick sheath, which continues on the right side into two large lateral valves, behind and in front into one lower one each. On the left side the flaps are absent, but this may be abnormal. On the other hand, the absence of the flaps at the edge of the gill opening is conspicuous. The gill is composed of 5 large bipinnate leaves. The construction of the mouthparts is that of Staurodoris. Number of lateral teeth 62 - 64. In the median line of the radula there is a false longitudinally vaulting dental plate, as a little raised ledge. Whether the form, of which unfortunately only one specimen was observed, is to be put to Staurodoris, despite the lack of the gill flaps, may remain to be seen. In any case it is closest to this genus.

Pseudoverrucosa resemble slugs, though they lack a shell. They are commonly white or yellow in color, but some have been seem with darker hues. They are characterized by tiny spots or protrusions on top of them.
