= Doris violacea =

Scientific classification
- Kingdom: Animalia
- Phylum: Mollusca
- Class: Gastropoda
- Order: Nudibranchia
- Family: Dorididae
- Genus: Doris
- Species: D. violacea

Binomial name
- Doris violacea (Bergh, 1904)

Synonyms
- Archidoris violacea Bergh, 1904; Archidoris africana Eliot, 1904

Species of gastropod

Doris violacea is a species of sea slug, a dorid nudibranch, a marine gastropod mollusc in the family Dorididae.

== Distribution ==
This species was described from a depth of 30-40 fathoms on the east coast of the southern island of New Zealand at various locations between the Otago Peninsula and Sumaru.
