= Doris parrae =

Scientific classification
- Kingdom: Animalia
- Phylum: Mollusca
- Class: Gastropoda
- Order: Nudibranchia
- Family: Dorididae
- Genus: Doris
- Species: D. parrae

Binomial name
- Doris parrae Ortea, 2017

Species of gastropod

Doris parrae is a species of sea slug (nudibranch), a marine gastropod mollusc in the family Dorididae. It is named after Chilean musician Violeta Parra.

== Distribution ==
This species was described from the Galapagos Islands.
