= Doris alboranica =

Scientific classification
- Kingdom: Animalia
- Phylum: Mollusca
- Class: Gastropoda
- Order: Nudibranchia
- Family: Dorididae
- Genus: Doris
- Species: D. alboranica

Binomial name
- Doris alboranica Bouchet, 1977

Species of gastropod

Doris alboranica is a species of sea slug, a dorid nudibranch, a marine gastropod mollusk in the family Dorididae.

== Distribution ==
This species was described from a single specimen found in deep water (910 m depth) at 36°05′N 4°52′W in the Alboran Sea.
