= Doris acerico =

Scientific classification
- Kingdom: Animalia
- Phylum: Mollusca
- Class: Gastropoda
- Order: Nudibranchia
- Family: Dorididae
- Genus: Doris
- Species: D. acerico

Binomial name
- Doris acerico Ortea & Espinosa, 2017

Species of gastropod

Doris acerico is a species of sea slug, a dorid nudibranch, a marine gastropod mollusc in the family Dorididae.

== Distribution ==
This species was described from Costa Rica, Cuba, and Guadeloupe, Caribbean Sea.
