= Doris morenoi =

Scientific classification
- Kingdom: Animalia
- Phylum: Mollusca
- Class: Gastropoda
- Order: Nudibranchia
- Family: Dorididae
- Genus: Doris
- Species: D. morenoi

Binomial name
- Doris morenoi Ortea, 1989

Species of gastropod

Doris morenoi is a species of sea slug, a dorid nudibranch, a marine gastropod mollusc in the family Dorididae.

== Distribution ==
This species was described from Cape Verde.
