= Doris adrianae =

Scientific classification
- Kingdom: Animalia
- Phylum: Mollusca
- Class: Gastropoda
- Order: Nudibranchia
- Family: Dorididae
- Genus: Doris
- Species: D. adrianae

Binomial name
- Doris adrianae Urgorri, Señarís, Díaz-Agras, Candás & Gómez-Rodríguez, 2021

Species of gastropod

Doris adrianae is a species of sea slug, a dorid nudibranch, a marine gastropod mollusc in the family Dorididae.

== Distribution ==
This species was described from Ria de Ferrol, Spain, Atlantic Ocean.
