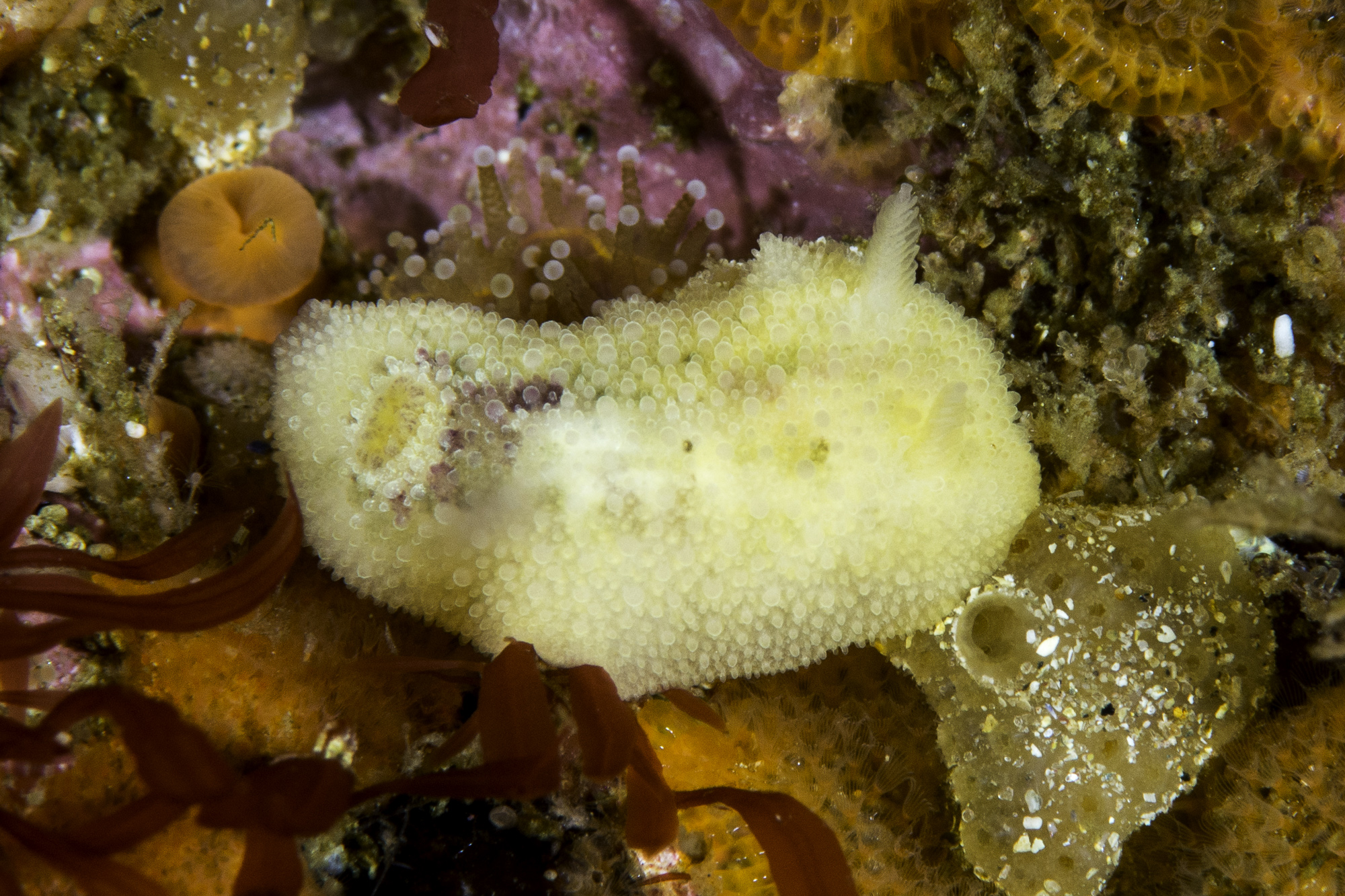
- Doris pseudoargus, Burtonport, Co Donegal, Ireland.

Scientific classification
- Kingdom: Animalia
- Phylum: Mollusca
- Class: Gastropoda
- Order: Nudibranchia
- Family: Dorididae
- Genus: Doris
- Species: D. pseudoargus

Binomial name
- Doris pseudoargus Rapp, 1827

Synonyms
- Archidoris pseudoargus (Rapp, 1827); Archidoris tuberculate (Muller, 1778); Doris areolata Stuwitz, 1836; Doris brittanica Johnston, 1838; Doris flavipes Leuckart, 1828; Doris leuckarti Delle Chiaje, 1841; Doris leuckartii Delle Chiaje, 1841; Doris mera Alder & Hancock, 1844; Doris schembrii Vérany, 1846

= Doris pseudoargus =

Species of gastropod

Doris pseudoargus is a species of sea slug, a dorid nudibranch, a marine gastropod mollusk in the family Dorididae.

== Distribution ==
This species was described from Le Havre, Seine-Maritime, France. A neotype was designated in 2002 based on a specimen from Locmariaquer, Atlantic coast of France. It has been reported from Norway south to the Mediterranean Sea. It can be found on the lower shore, and offshore to 300 m.

== Description ==
Doris pseudoargus can reach 120 mm in length. It is oval and firm. The mantle is variously mottled and blotched with yellow, green, brown, and red and coarsely tuberculate. Its rhinophores are short and conical.

== Ecology ==
Doris pseudoargus mainly feeds on the sponge Halichondria panicea.
