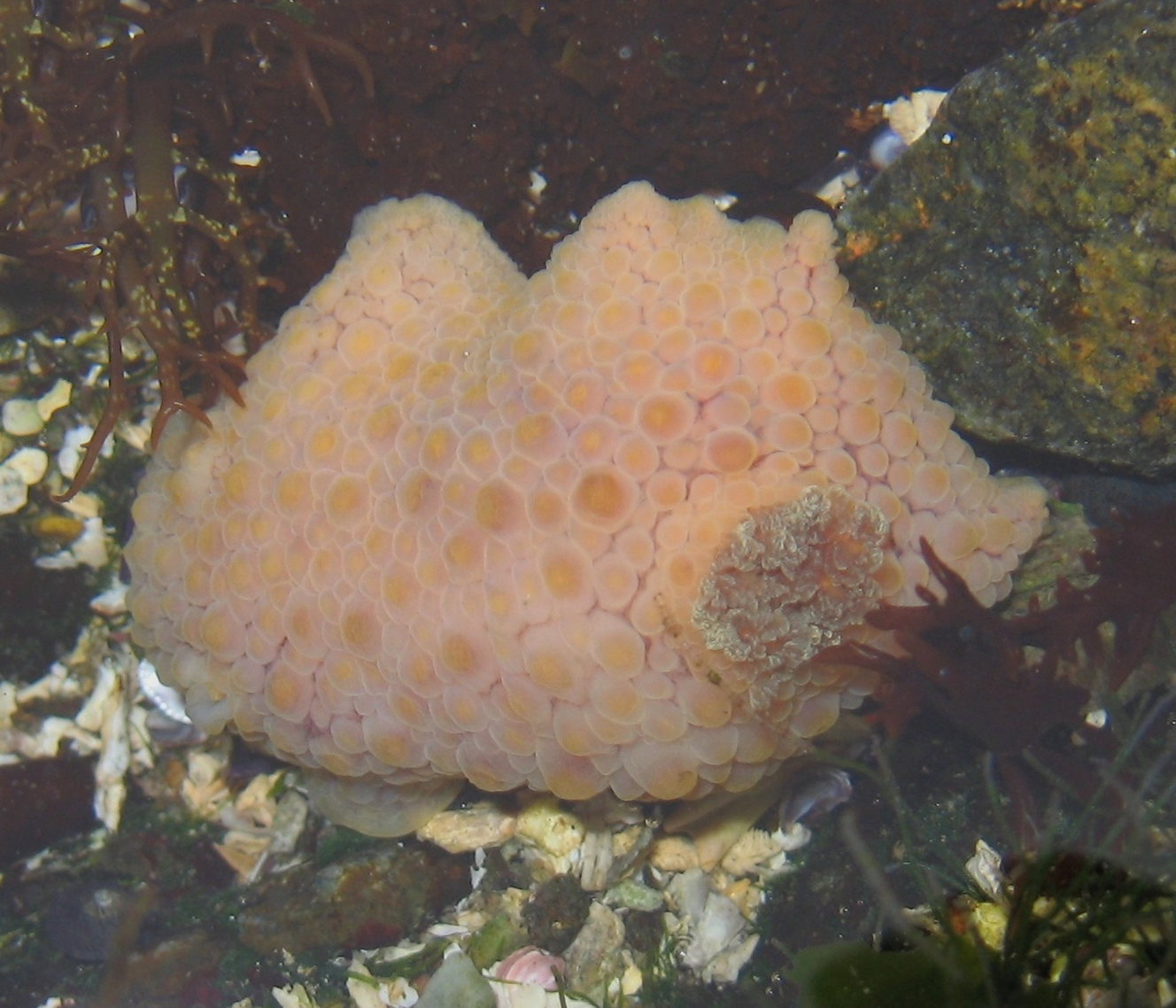

Scientific classification
- Kingdom: Animalia
- Phylum: Mollusca
- Class: Gastropoda
- Order: Nudibranchia
- Family: Dorididae
- Genus: Doris
- Species: D. fontainii

Binomial name
- Doris fontainii d'Orbigny, 1837

= Doris fontainii =

Species of gastropod

Doris fontainii is a species of sea slug, a dorid nudibranch, a marine gastropod mollusk in the family Dorididae.

== Distribution ==
This species was described from Chile. It has been reported from northern Argentina southwards on the Atlantic Ocean coast of South America and from Peru southwards on the Pacific coast of South America. It is also recorded from Tristan da Cunha.
