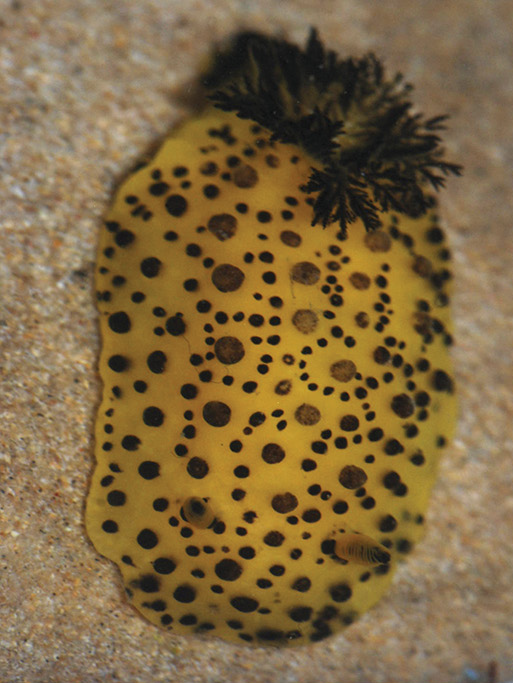

Scientific classification
- Kingdom: Animalia
- Phylum: Mollusca
- Class: Gastropoda
- Order: Nudibranchia
- Family: Dorididae
- Genus: Doris
- Species: D. ananas

Binomial name
- Doris ananas Lima, Tibiriçá & Simone, 2016

= Doris ananas =

Species of gastropod

Doris ananas is a species of sea slug, a dorid nudibranch, a marine gastropod mollusc in the family Dorididae.

== Distribution ==
This species was described from Mozambique.
