= Doris scripta =

Scientific classification
- Kingdom: Animalia
- Phylum: Mollusca
- Class: Gastropoda
- Order: Nudibranchia
- Family: Dorididae
- Genus: Doris
- Species: D. scripta

Binomial name
- Doris scripta (Bergh, 1907)

Synonyms
- Archidoris scripta Bergh, 1907

Species of gastropod

Doris scripta is a species of sea slug, a dorid nudibranch, a marine gastropod mollusc in the family Dorididae.

== Distribution ==
This species was described from three specimens dredged off the Hongazi River, South Africa.
