= Doris caeca =

Scientific classification
- Kingdom: Animalia
- Phylum: Mollusca
- Class: Gastropoda
- Order: Nudibranchia
- Family: Dorididae
- Genus: Doris
- Species: D. caeca

Binomial name
- Doris caeca (Valdés, 2001)

Synonyms
- Austrodoris caeca Valdés, 2001

Species of gastropod

Doris caeca is a species of sea slug, a dorid nudibranch, a marine gastropod mollusc in the family Dorididae.

== Distribution ==
This species was described from 791 to 795 m depth, Banc Combe, in the Pacific Ocean 12°15′S 177°28′W and a number of sites in the same area, to as far south as New Caledonia 23°10′S 166°43′E between 650 and 1300 m depth.
