= Doris nobilis =

Scientific classification
- Kingdom: Animalia
- Phylum: Mollusca
- Class: Gastropoda
- Order: Nudibranchia
- Family: Dorididae
- Genus: Doris
- Species: D. nobilis

Binomial name
- Doris nobilis (Odhner, 1907)

Synonyms
- Archidoris nobilis Odhner, 1907 (basionym)

Species of gastropod

Doris nobilis is a species of sea slug, a dorid nudibranch, a marine gastropod mollusc in the family Dorididae.

== Distribution ==
This species was described from Norway.
