= Doris claurina =

Scientific classification
- Kingdom: Animalia
- Phylum: Mollusca
- Class: Gastropoda
- Order: Nudibranchia
- Family: Dorididae
- Genus: Doris
- Species: D. claurina

Binomial name
- Doris claurina (Marcus, Er., 1959)

Synonyms
- Neodoris claurina Marcus, Er., 1959

Species of gastropod

Doris claurina is a species of sea slug, a dorid nudibranch, a marine gastropod mollusc in the family Dorididae.

== Distribution ==
This species was described from Chile.
