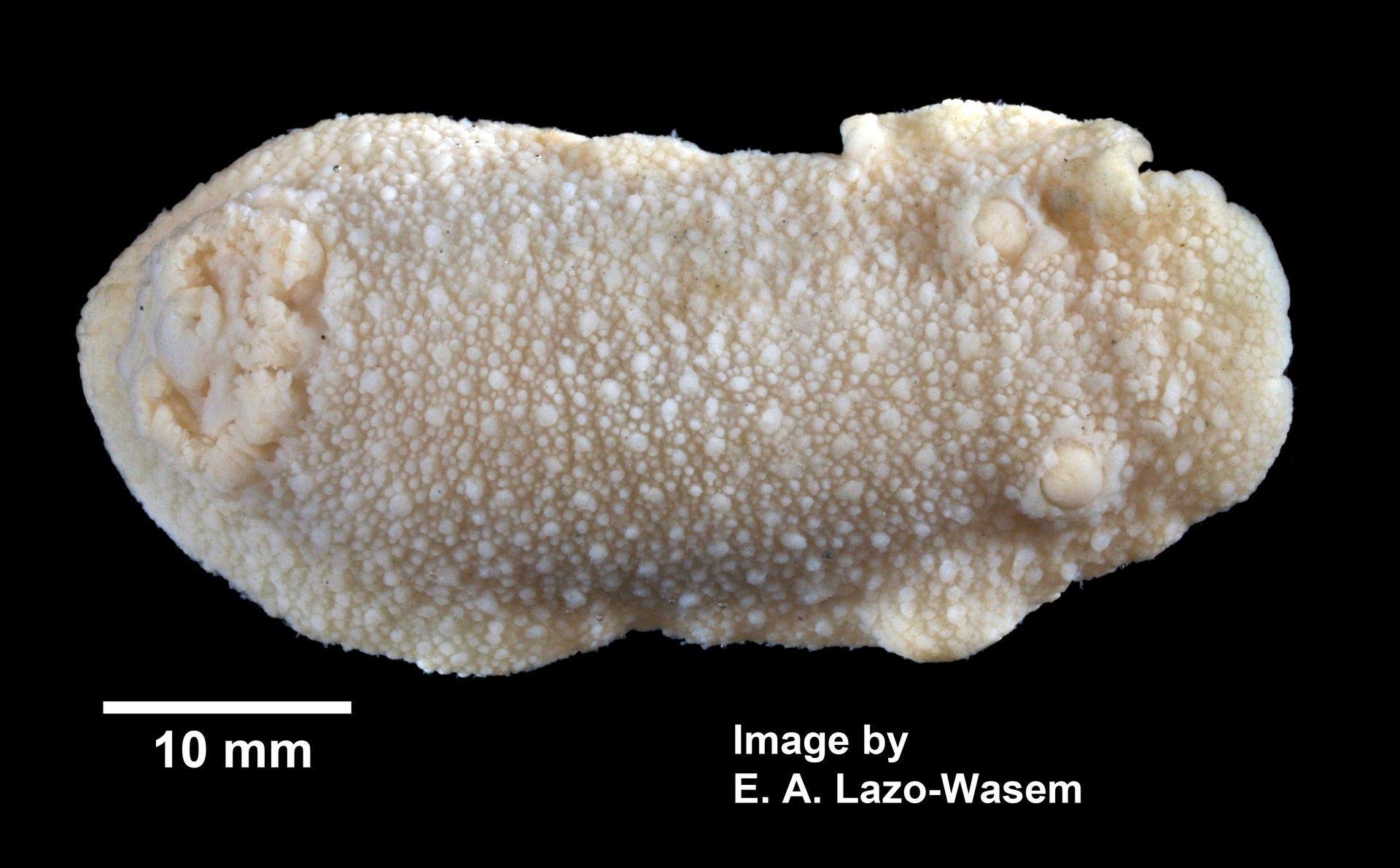

Scientific classification
- Kingdom: Animalia
- Phylum: Mollusca
- Class: Gastropoda
- Order: Nudibranchia
- Family: Dorididae
- Genus: Doris
- Species: D. kerguelenensis

Binomial name
- Doris kerguelenensis (Bergh, 1884)

Synonyms
- Archidoris australis Bergh, 1884; Archidoris kerguelenensis Bergh, 1884 (original combination); Archidoris rubescens Bergh, 1898; Archidoris tuberculata var. antarctica Vayssière, 1917; Austrodoris crenulata Odhner, 1926; Austrodoris georgiensis Garcia, Troncoso, Garcia-Gomez & Cervera, 1993; Austrodoris kerguelenensis (Bergh, 1884); Austrodoris macmurdensis Odhner, 1934; Austrodoris michaelseni Odhner, 1926; Austrodoris mishu Ev. Marcus, 1985; Austrodoris nivium Odhner, 1934; Austrodoris tomentosa Odhner, 1934; Austrodoris vicentei Ev. Marcus, 1985

= Doris kerguelenensis =

Species of gastropod

Doris kerguelenensis is a species of sea slug, a dorid nudibranch, a marine gastropod mollusc in the family Dorididae.

== Distribution ==
The type locality for this species is the Kerguelen Islands. It has been widely reported all round Antarctica but molecular investigations suggest that it consists of a species complex and many of the synonymised names may be valid.
