= Doris kyolis =

Scientific classification
- Domain: Eukaryota
- Kingdom: Animalia
- Phylum: Mollusca
- Class: Gastropoda
- Order: Nudibranchia
- Family: Dorididae
- Genus: Doris
- Species: D. kyolis

Binomial name
- Doris kyolis (Ev. Marcus & Er. Marcus, 1967)

Synonyms
- Siraius kyolis Ev. Marcus & Er. Marcus, 1967

Species of gastropod

Doris kyolis is a species of sea slug, a dorid nudibranch, a shell-less marine gastropod mollusk in the family Dorididae.

== Distribution ==
Distribution of Doris kyolis includes Rio de Janeiro State, southeastern Brazil.

== Description ==
The maximum recorded body length is 18 mm.

== Ecology ==
Minimum recorded depth is 1 m. Maximum recorded depth is 1 m.

Prey of Doris kyolis include sponges Dysidea etheria, Lissondendoryx isodictialis, Haliclona sp. and Plakina sp.
