= Doris laboutei =

Scientific classification
- Kingdom: Animalia
- Phylum: Mollusca
- Class: Gastropoda
- Order: Nudibranchia
- Family: Dorididae
- Genus: Doris
- Species: D. laboutei

Binomial name
- Doris laboutei (Valdés, 2001)

Synonyms
- Austrodoris laboutei Valdés, 2001

Species of gastropod

Doris laboutei is a species of sea slug, a dorid nudibranch, a marine gastropod mollusc in the family Dorididae.

== Distribution ==
This species was described from one specimen 15 mm in length (preserved), collected on the Bathus 1 Expedition, stn. CP711 (21°43′S 166°36′E), 315-327 m, East of New Caledonia.
