= Doris beringiensis =

Scientific classification
- Kingdom: Animalia
- Phylum: Mollusca
- Class: Gastropoda
- Order: Nudibranchia
- Family: Dorididae
- Genus: Doris
- Species: D. beringiensis

Binomial name
- Doris beringiensis (Martynov, Sanamyan & Korshunova, 2015)

Synonyms
- Archidoris beringiensis Martynov, Sanamyan & Korshunova, 2015

Species of gastropod

Doris beringiensis is a species of sea slug, a dorid nudibranch, a marine gastropod mollusc in the family Dorididae.

== Distribution ==
This species was described from the Commander Islands, Kamchatka.
