= Doris capensis =

Scientific classification
- Kingdom: Animalia
- Phylum: Mollusca
- Class: Gastropoda
- Order: Nudibranchia
- Family: Dorididae
- Genus: Doris
- Species: D. capensis

Binomial name
- Doris capensis (Bergh, 1907)

Synonyms
- Archidoris capensis Bergh, 1907

Species of gastropod

Doris capensis is a species of sea slug, a dorid nudibranch, a marine gastropod mollusc in the family Dorididae.

== Distribution ==
This species was described from one specimen caught in a trawl at Cape Point, South Africa.
