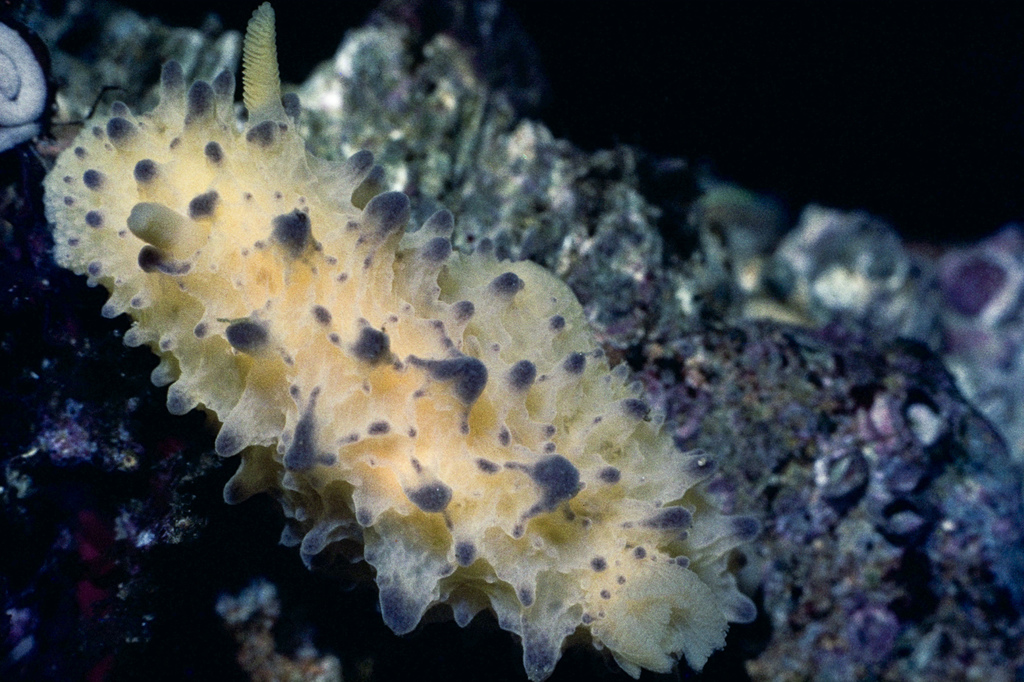

Scientific classification
- Kingdom: Animalia
- Phylum: Mollusca
- Class: Gastropoda
- Order: Nudibranchia
- Family: Dorididae
- Genus: Doris
- Species: D. sticta

Binomial name
- Doris sticta (Iredale & O'Donoghue, 1923)

Synonyms
- Doris maculata Garstang, 1895 : junior homonym of Doris maculata Montagu, 1804; Doridigitata sticta Iredale & O'Donoghue, 1923 (original combination)

= Doris sticta =

Species of gastropod

Doris sticta is a species of sea slug, a dorid nudibranch, a marine gastropod mollusk in the family Dorididae.

== Distribution ==
This species was described from Plymouth, Devon, England. It has been reported from Ireland south to the Mediterranean Sea.
