= Doris sugashimae =

Scientific classification
- Kingdom: Animalia
- Phylum: Mollusca
- Class: Gastropoda
- Order: Nudibranchia
- Family: Dorididae
- Genus: Doris
- Species: D. sugashimae

Binomial name
- Doris sugashimae (Baba, 1998)

Synonyms
- Archidoris sugashimae Baba, 1998

Species of gastropod

Doris sugashimae is a species of sea slug, a dorid nudibranch, a marine gastropod mollusc in the family Dorididae.

== Distribution ==
This species was described from Japan. It has been reported from 4 m depth at Futou beach, Tago, Futou, Dougashima, Nishiizu, Japan.
