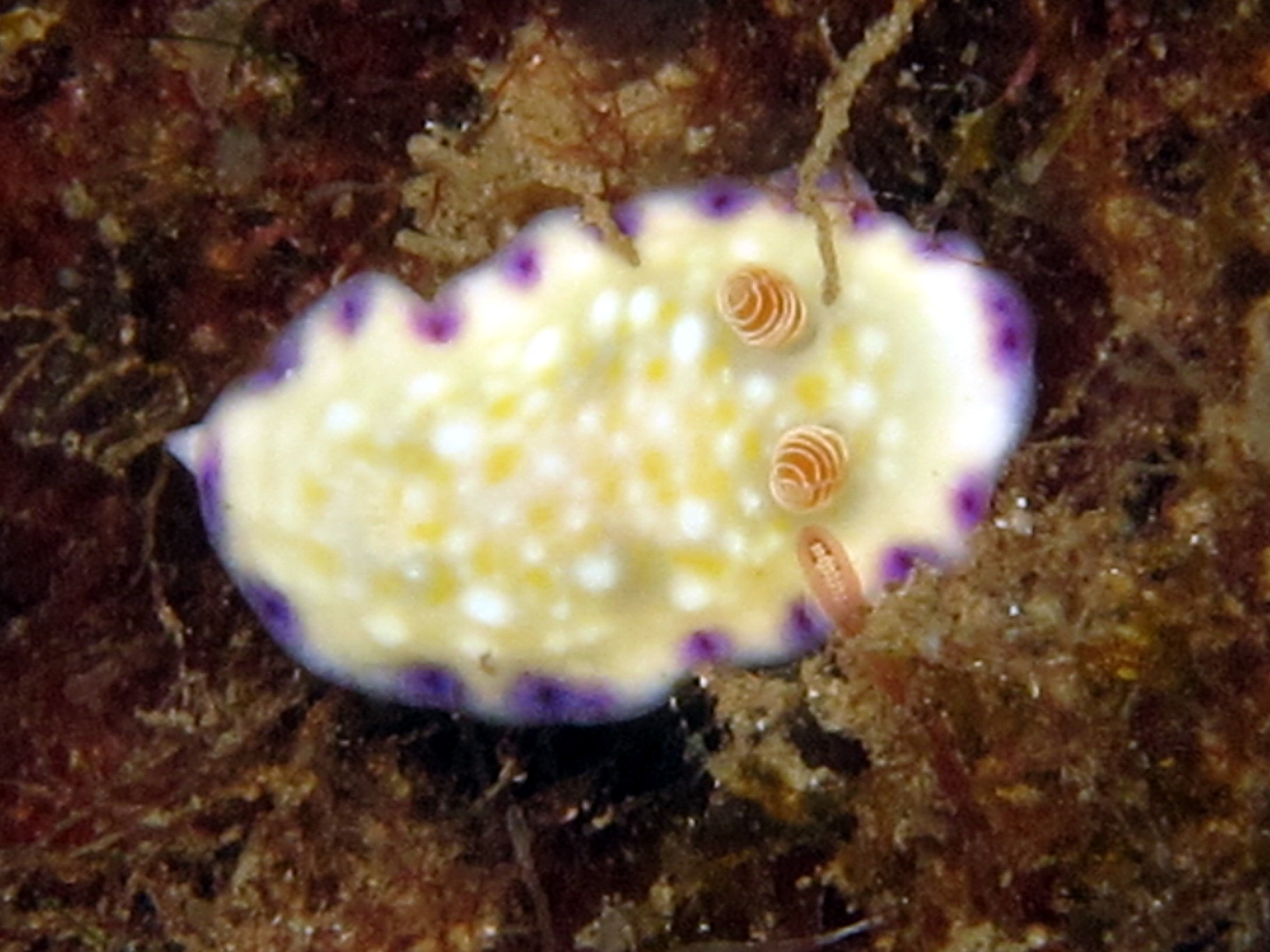
- Goniobranchus albopustulosus, Maui, Hawaii.

Scientific classification
- Kingdom: Animalia
- Phylum: Mollusca
- Class: Gastropoda
- Order: Nudibranchia
- Family: Chromodorididae
- Genus: Goniobranchus
- Species: G. albopustulosus

Binomial name
- Goniobranchus albopustulosus (Pease, 1860)

Synonyms
- Chromodoris albopustulosa (Pease, 1860); Doris albopustulosa Pease, 1860 (basionym)

= Goniobranchus albopustulosus =

Species of gastropod

Goniobranchus albopustulosus is a species of colourful sea slug, a dorid nudibranch, a marine gastropod mollusc in the family Chromodorididae.

== Distribution ==
This marine species was described from Hawaii. It has been reported from the Marshall Islands and Kure Atoll.
