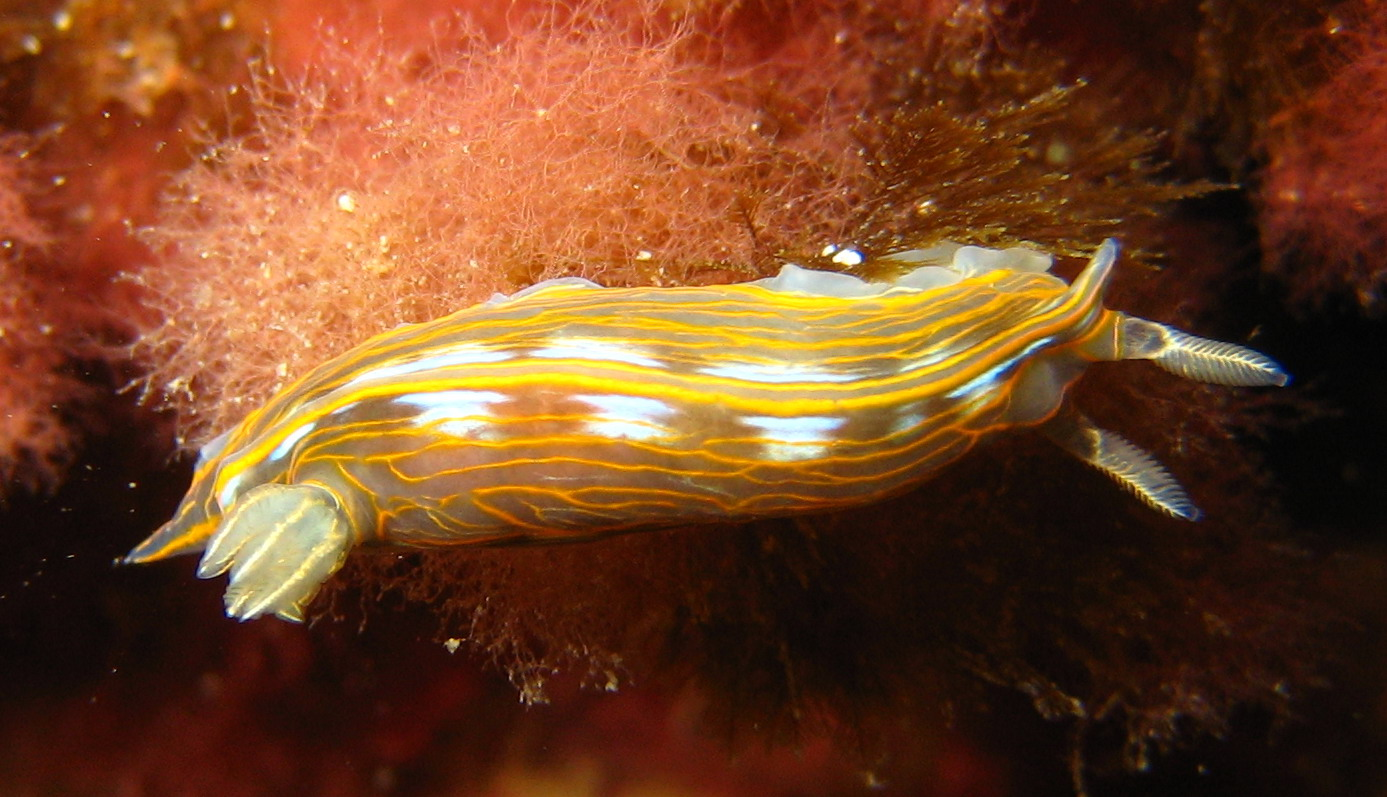
- A much paler than average color form of Felimare villafranca

Scientific classification
- Kingdom: Animalia
- Phylum: Mollusca
- Class: Gastropoda
- Order: Nudibranchia
- Family: Chromodorididae
- Genus: Felimare
- Species: F. villafranca

Binomial name
- Felimare villafranca (Risso, 1818)

Synonyms
- Chromodoris coerulea (Risso, 1818); Chromodoris gracilis Rapp, L.W. Von, 1827; Chromodoris messinensis Ihering, 1880; Doris coerulea Risso, 1818; Doris gracilis Rapp, 1827; Doris marmorata Savigny, M.J.C.L. De, 1827; Doris pasini Verany, 1846; Doris pasinii Vérany, J.B., 1846; Doris pulcherrima Cantraine, 1835; Doris schultziana Chiaje, S. delle, 1841; Doris schultzii Delle Chiaje, 1841; Doris tenera O.G. Costa; Doris tricolor Cantraine, F.J., 1835; Doris villae Verany, 1846; Doris villafranca Risso, 1818 (basionym); Glossodoris gracilis Rapp, L.W. Von, 1827; Glossodoris schultzii Chiaje, S. delle, 1841; Goniodoris elegans Deshayes, G.P., 1866; Goniodoris vivida Forbes, E., 1844; Hypselodoris midatlantica Gosliner, T.M., 1990; Hypselodoris villafranca (Risso, 1818)

= Felimare villafranca =

Species of gastropod

Felimare villafranca is a species of colourful sea slug or dorid nudibranch, a marine gastropod mollusc in the family Chromodorididae.

== Distribution ==
This nudibranch is found on the coasts of the Eastern Atlantic Ocean and the Mediterranean Sea from France, the Bay of Biscay to Morocco, Cape Verde Islands, Canary Islands and the Azores.

== Description ==
This species is predominantly dark blue in colour with a pattern of longitudinal yellow lines. The yellow lines branch and curve, sometimes forming a network in the middle of the back. At the edge of the mantle there is a double yellow line with a series of bright blue elongate patches or a broken blue line between it and the next set of lines which cover the back. A series of white patches may be positioned inside these blue markings. The rhinophores are translucent blue with opaque white pigment at the base of the club and in a line on the back; the tips are blue. The gills are also translucent blue with a midline of opaque white on the inner and outer faces. The body grows to a length of 40 mm.

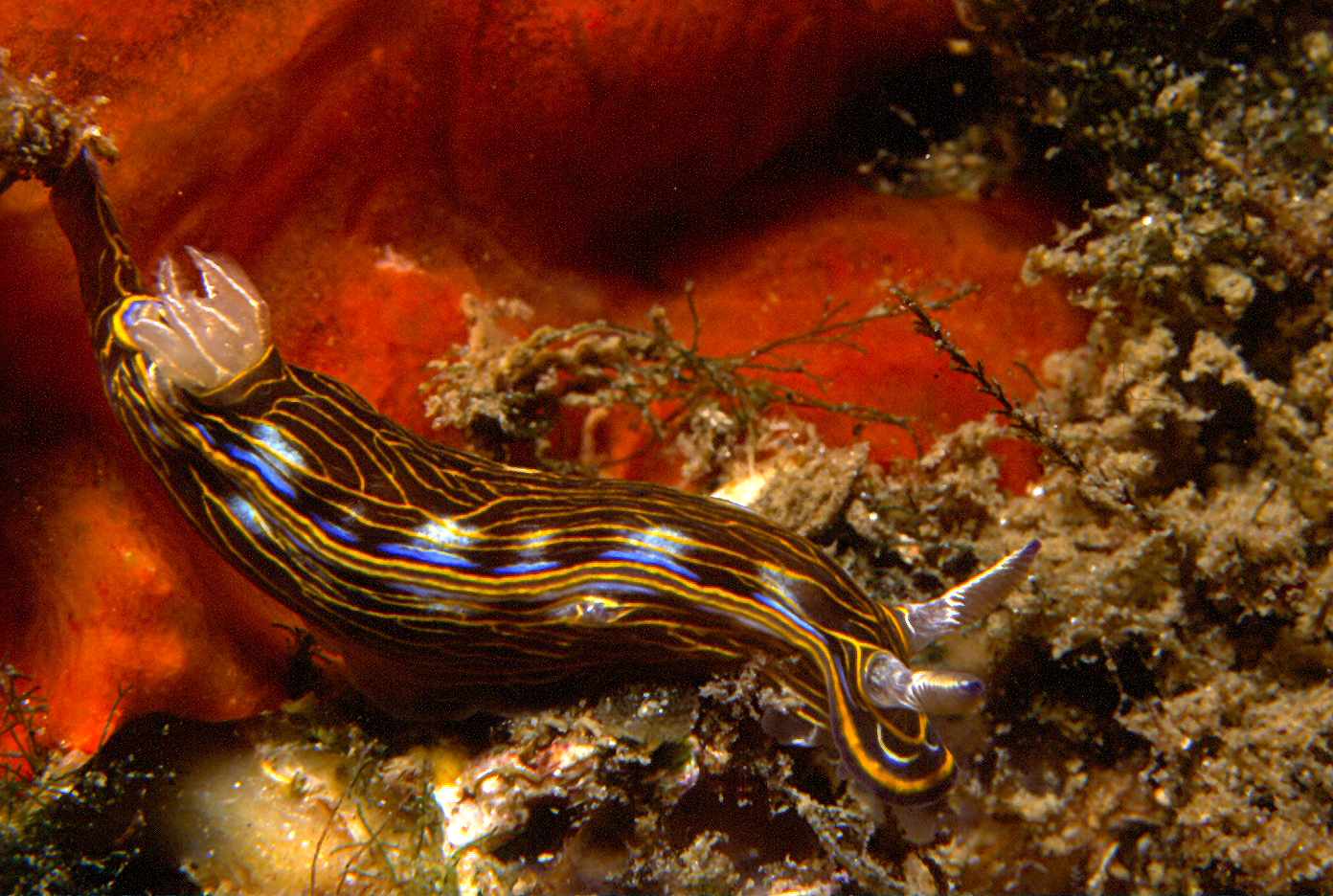
Felimare villafranca

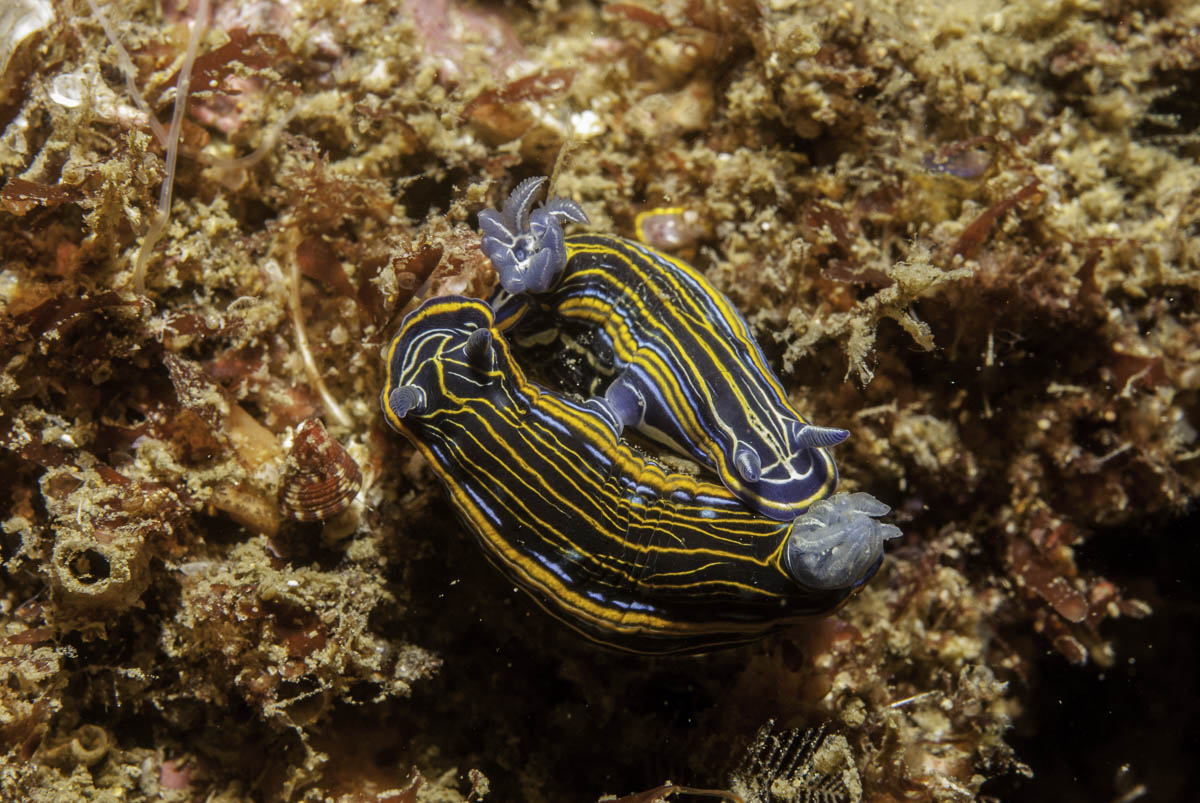
A mating pair in Sagres, Portugal
