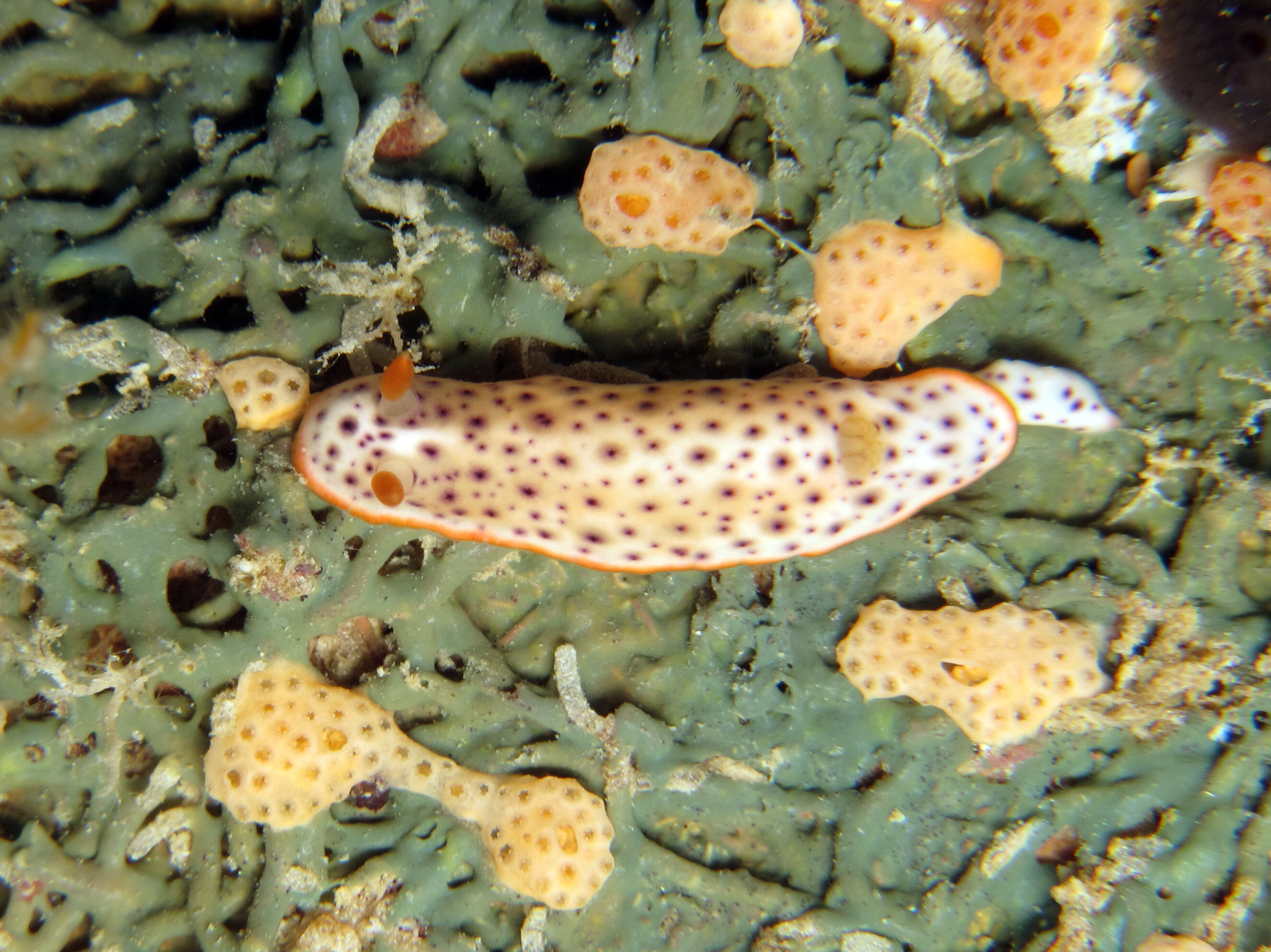

Scientific classification
- Kingdom: Animalia
- Phylum: Mollusca
- Class: Gastropoda
- Order: Nudibranchia
- Family: Chromodorididae
- Genus: Chromodoris
- Species: C. aspersa

Binomial name
- Chromodoris aspersa (Gould, 1852)

Synonyms
- Doris aspersa Gould, 1852

= Chromodoris aspersa =

Species of gastropod

Chromodoris aspersa is a species of colourful sea slug, a dorid nudibranch, a marine gastropod mollusc in the family Chromodorididae.

== Distribution ==
This chromodorid nudibranch was first described from Kawahe or Vincennes Island, Tuamotus. It is a widespread species in the Indo-Pacific tropical region.

== Description ==
Chromodoris aspersa has a white mantle covered with small rounded purple spots which have a diffuse edge. The mantle rim has a marginal band of orange-yellow. The gills and rhinophores are marked with orange-yellow. This species has been revealed to be a species complex and work is needed to elucidate the species.
