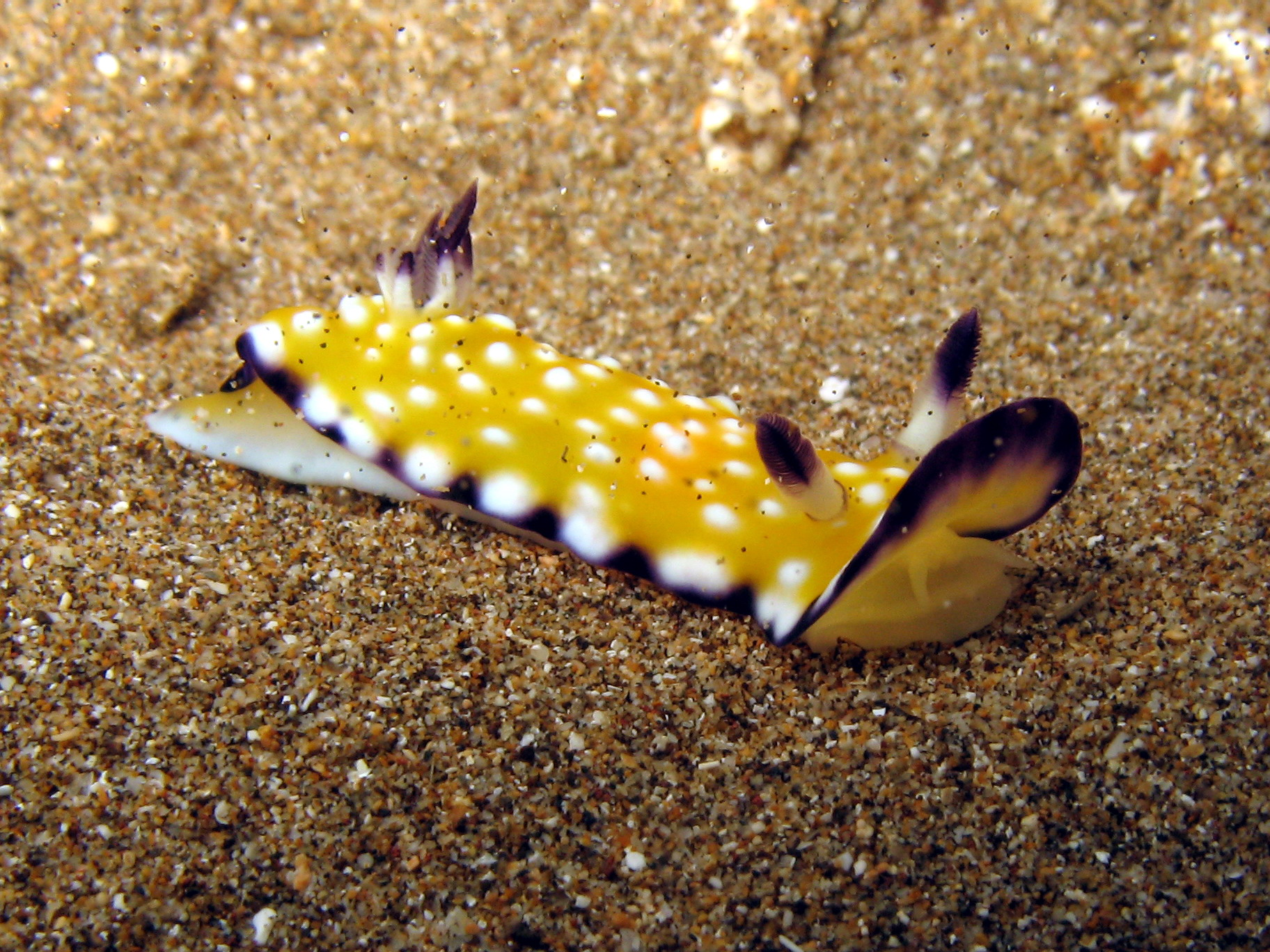

Scientific classification
- Kingdom: Animalia
- Phylum: Mollusca
- Class: Gastropoda
- Order: Nudibranchia
- Family: Chromodorididae
- Genus: Goniobranchus
- Species: G. vibratus

Binomial name
- Goniobranchus vibratus (Pease, 1860)

Synonyms
- Chromodoris vibrata (Pease, 1860); Doris propinquata Pease, 1860; Doris vibrata Pease, 1860 (basionym)

= Goniobranchus vibratus =

Species of gastropod

Goniobranchus vibratus, common name trembling nudibranch, is a species of colourful sea slug, a dorid nudibranch, a marine gastropod mollusc in the family Chromodorididae.

== Etymology ==
The Latin species name vibratus derives from its habit of vibrating the gills rhythmically much like some species of Thorunna and Noumea.

== Distribution ==
This species was described from Hawaii. It has been reported in the Marshall Islands, in French Polynesia and in Japan, in the tropical Pacific Ocean.

== Habitat ==
These diurnal nudibranchs can be found exposed on subtidal reefs, rocky habitats and in tide pools or low intertidal, at depths of 1–24 m (3 ft 3 in – 78 ft 9 in).

== Description ==
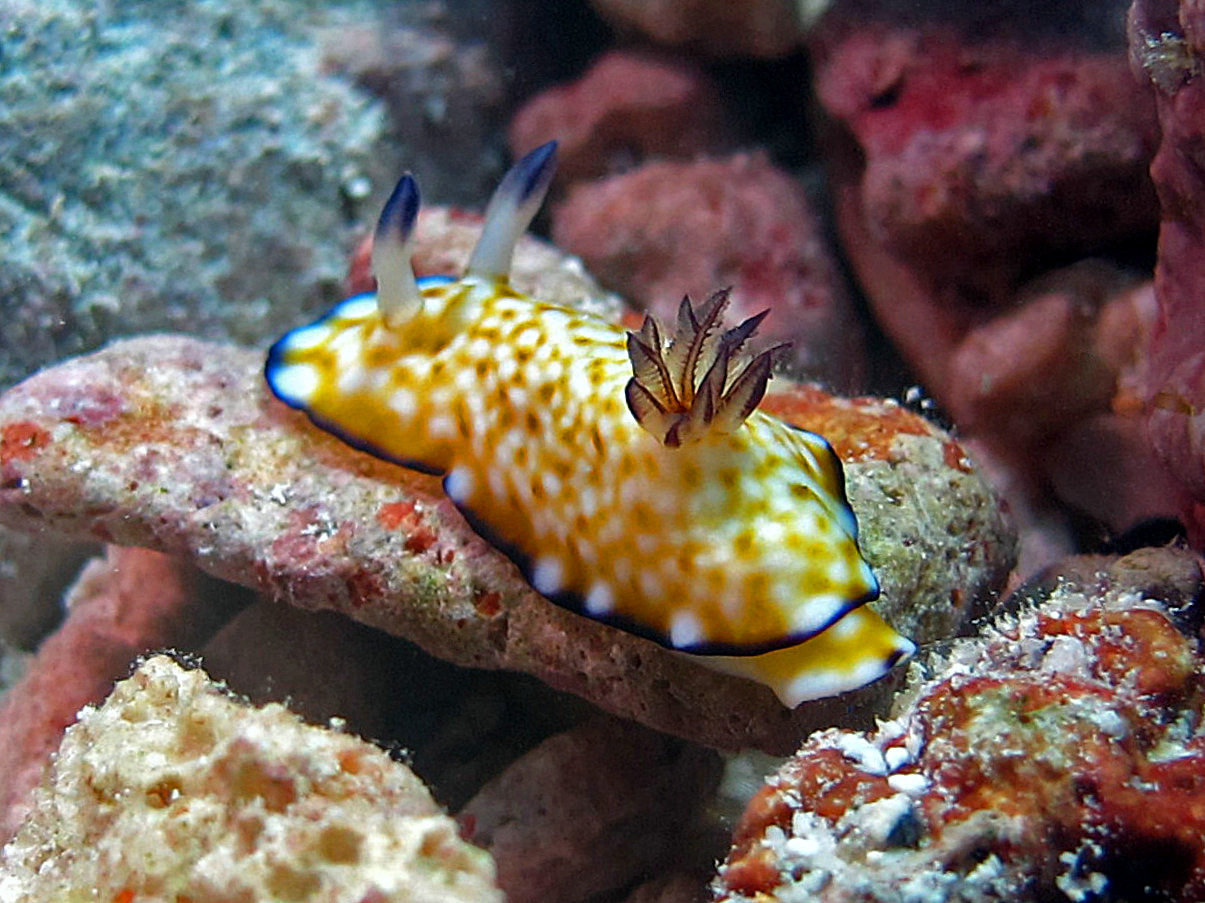
Goniobranchus vibratus from Rangiroa (French Polynesia)

The length of the body reaches 60–65 mm. The basic body colour of these nudibranchs is bright yellow, with small white dots in relief. The margins of the mantle are bluish-purple, with large white pustules. The outline of the body is oblong or oval. Mantle is smooth and rounded. The thin margins do not conceal the foot behind. The seven brachial plumes are small, erect, ciliated and edged with violet. Dorsal tentacles are violet, short, ovate and lamellated. Foot is white and almost wide as the mantle.

== Biology ==
Goniobranchus vibratus feeds on encrusting sponges (Porifera, Phoriospongia poni or probably Chelonaplysilla violacea). It lays a mass of eggs in a ribbon of 2-3 whorls. Hatching occurs in about 7 days.
