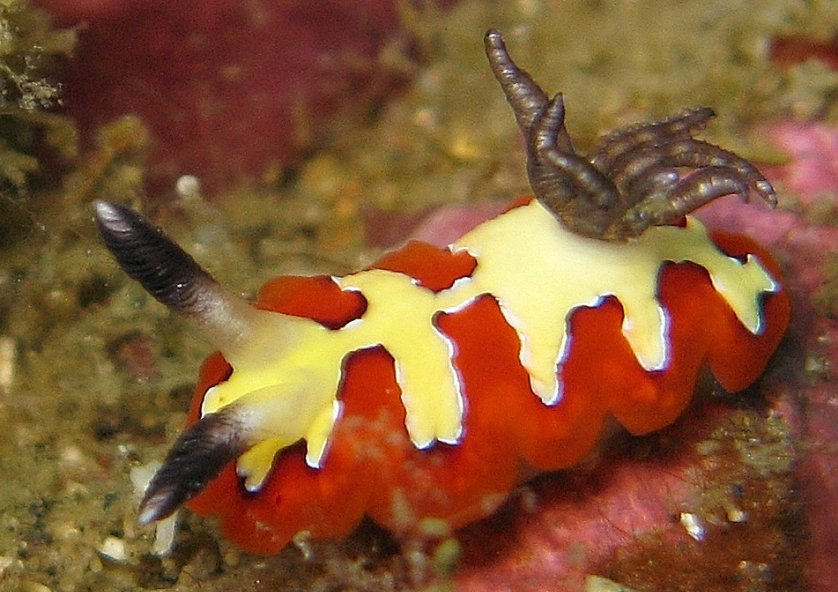
- Lembeh Strait, Indonesia

Scientific classification
- Kingdom: Animalia
- Phylum: Mollusca
- Class: Gastropoda
- Order: Nudibranchia
- Family: Chromodorididae
- Genus: Goniobranchus
- Species: G. fidelis

Binomial name
- Goniobranchus fidelis (Kelaart, 1858)

Synonyms
- Chromodoris fidelis (Kelaart, 1858); Chromodoris flammulata Bergh, 1905; Chromodoris krishna Rudman, 1973; Chromodoris lactea Bergh, 1905; Doris fidelis Kelaart, 1858 (basionym); Glossodoris fidelis (Kelaart, 1858)

= Goniobranchus fidelis =

Faithful sea slug

Species of gastropod

Goniobranchus fidelis, also commonly known as the faithful sea slug, is a species of colourful sea slug, a dorid nudibranch, a marine gastropod mollusc in the family Chromodorididae.

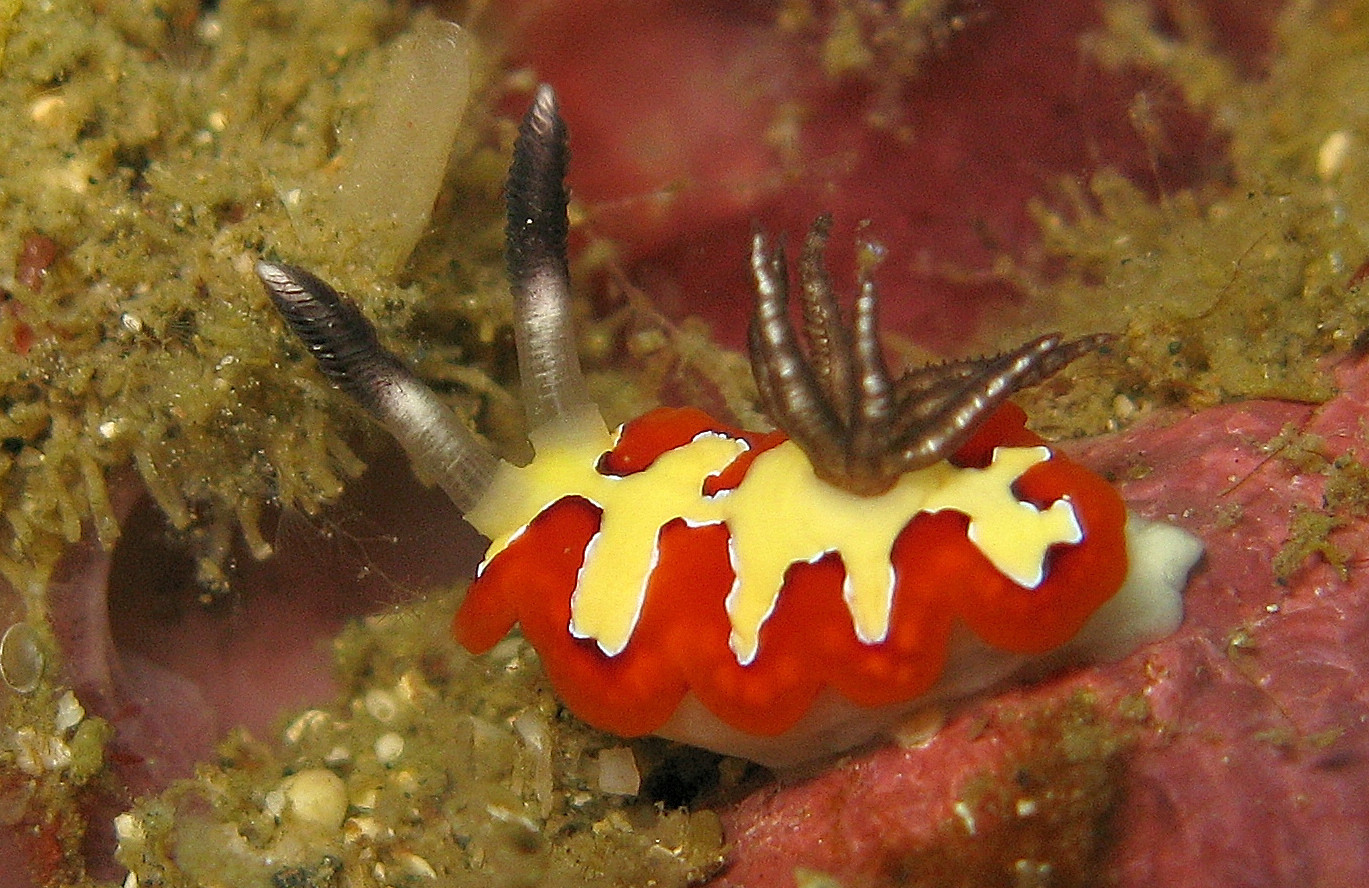
Goniobranchus fidelis. Posterior to the right.

== Description ==
Goniobranchus fidelis can reach more than 25 mm (0.98 in) in length. The foot of the animal is cream in color; it is elongate and is almost covered by the edges of the wide mantle. The more central part of the mantle has a creamy-white area with scalloped edges, whereas the entire wide margin of the mantle is orange or red. Where the two differently coloured areas meet, there is a burgundy-colored border which varies in width from one animal to the other. The rhinophores are laminated, contractile and greyish in color with lighter colour at the tip. The shade of grey varies from one individual to another. The gills are the same colour as the rhinophores and they are retractable.

== Distribution and habitat ==
This species was described from Sri Lanka, Indian Ocean. The distribution of Goniobranchus fidelis includes the tropical Indo-West Pacific and Red Sea. Its habitat is the external reef area as well on the top or on the slope up to 20 m (66 ft) deep with a preference for dead corals.

== Biology ==
This sea slug is benthic and diurnal, moves without any fear of being taken for a prey, because of the presence of defensive glands distributed in its body tissues and shown to the potential predators through its warning coloration.
