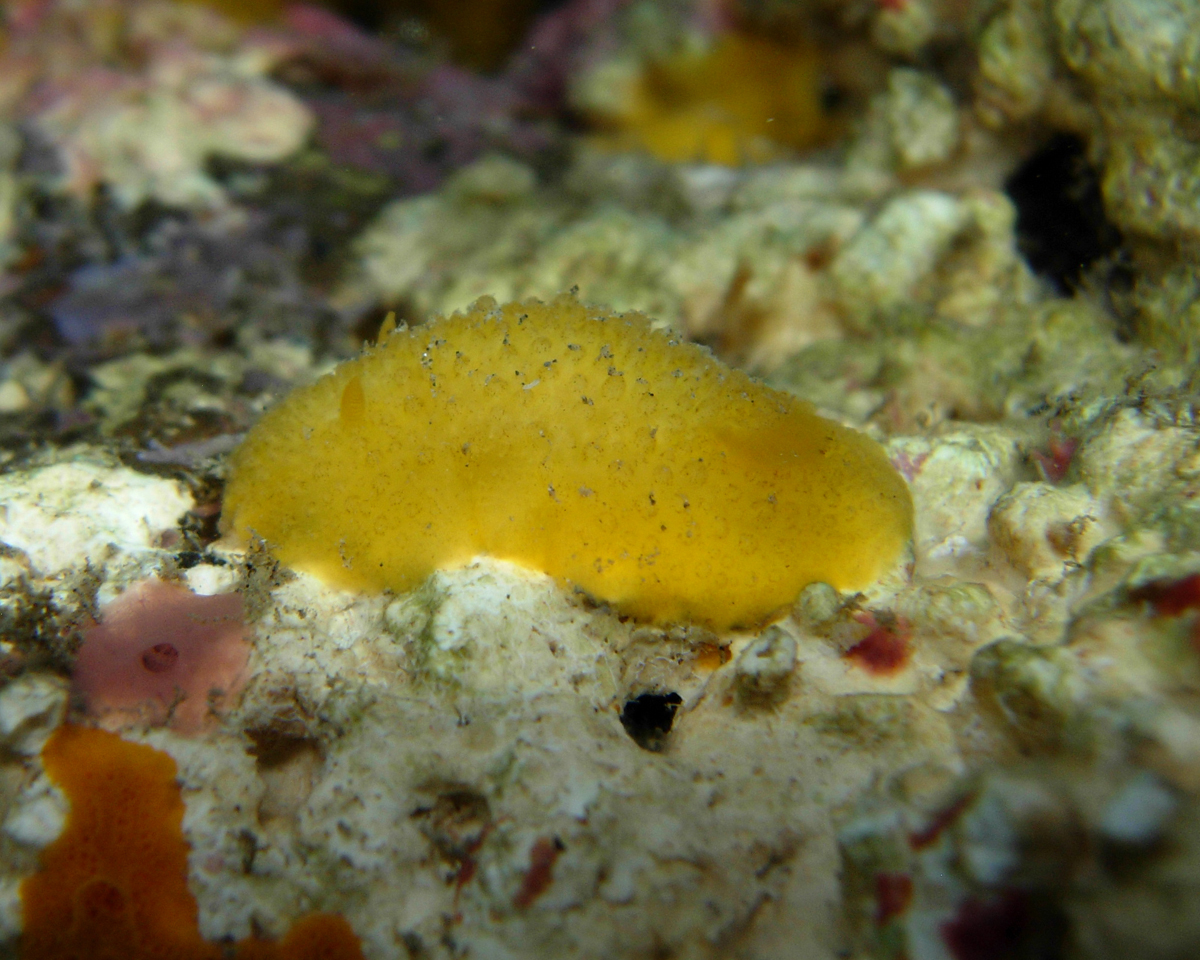
- Doriopsis granulosa, la Réunion

Scientific classification
- Kingdom: Animalia
- Phylum: Mollusca
- Class: Gastropoda
- Order: Nudibranchia
- Family: Dorididae
- Genus: Doriopsis
- Species: D. granulosa

Binomial name
- Doriopsis granulosa Pease, 1860

Synonyms
- Doris granulosa (Pease, 1860); Ctenodoris aurantiaca (Eliot, 1913); Doriopsis scabra Pease, 1871; Doris aurantiaca Eliot, 1913; Guyonia flava Risbec, 1928

= Doriopsis granulosa =

Species of gastropod

Doriopsis granulosa is a species of sea slug, a dorid nudibranch, a marine gastropod mollusk in the family Dorididae.

== Distribution ==
This species was described from the Hawaiian Islands, then called, by Europeans, the Sandwich Islands. It has been reported from many places in the Indo-West Pacific. Different colour forms may turn out to be a species complex.
