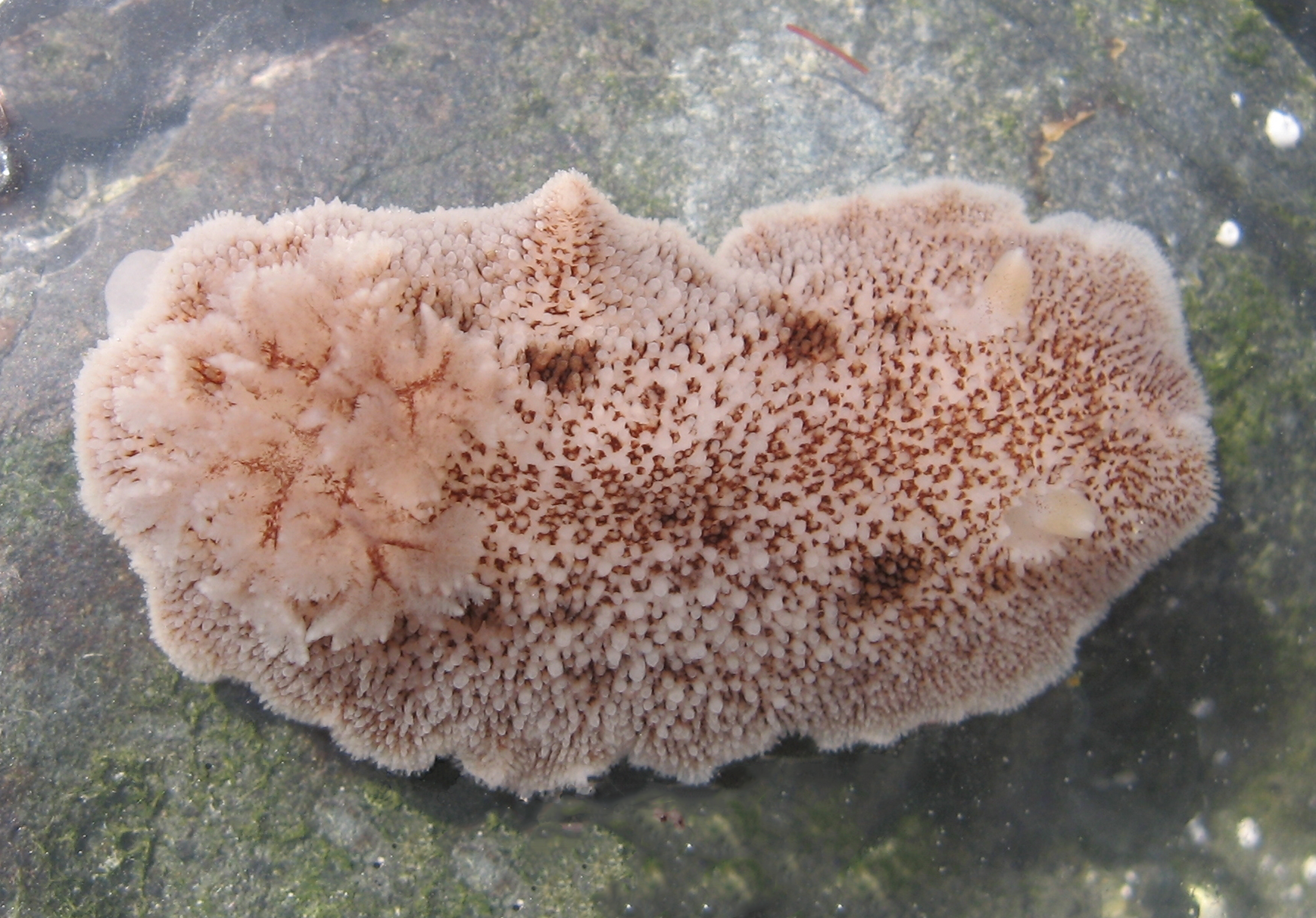

Scientific classification
- Kingdom: Animalia
- Phylum: Mollusca
- Class: Gastropoda
- Order: Nudibranchia
- Family: Discodorididae
- Genus: Diaulula
- Species: D. variolata

Binomial name
- Diaulula variolata (d'Orbigny, 1837)

= Diaulula variolata =

Species of gastropod

Diaulula variolata is a species of sea slug or dorid nudibranch, a marine gastropod mollusk in the family Discodorididae.
