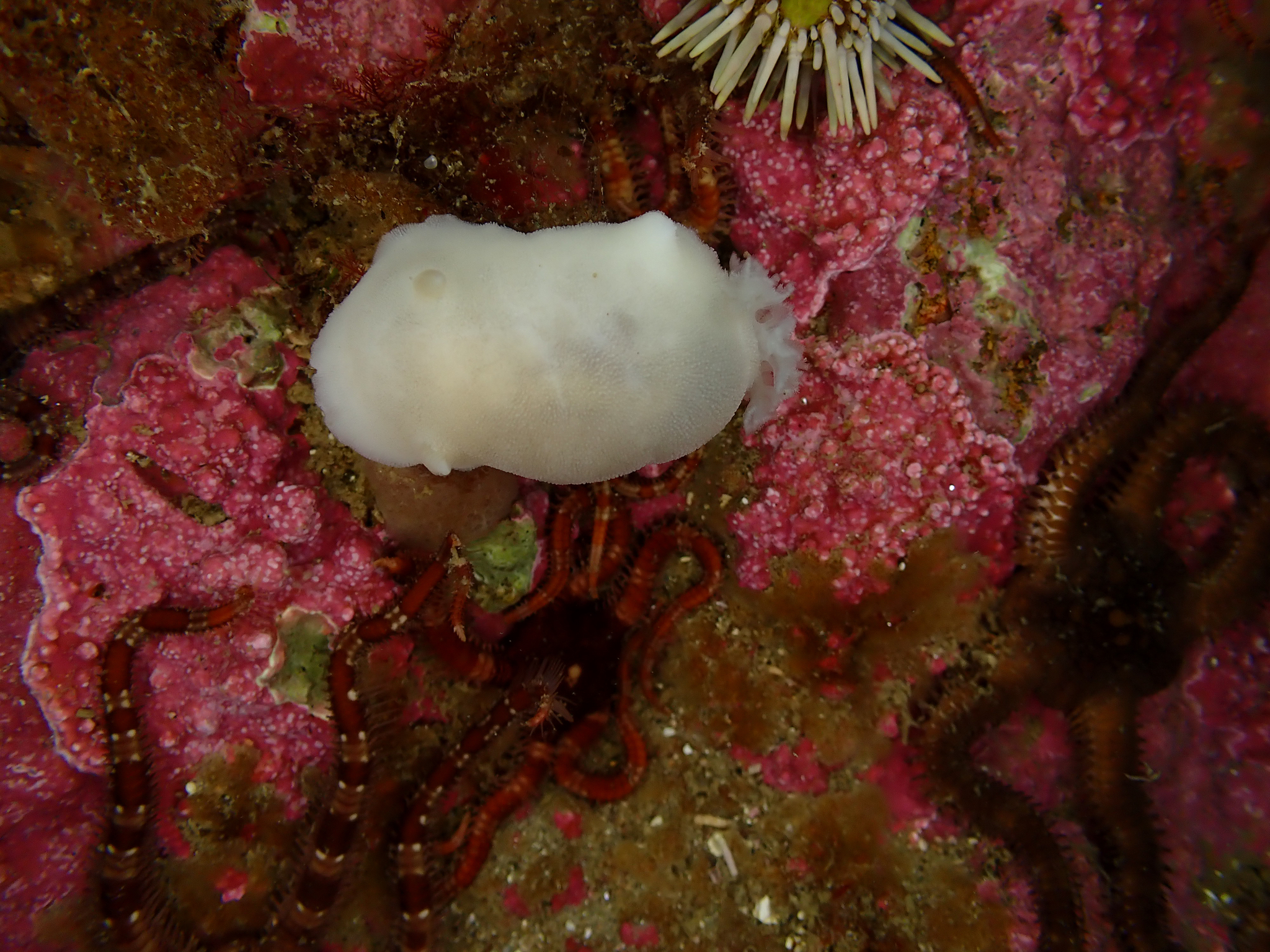

Scientific classification
- Kingdom: Animalia
- Phylum: Mollusca
- Class: Gastropoda
- Order: Nudibranchia
- Family: Discodorididae
- Genus: Diaulula
- Species: D. punctuolata

Binomial name
- Diaulula punctuolata (d'Orbigny, 1837)

Synonyms
- Anisodoris punctuolata Anisodoris punctuolata Diaulula sandiegensis Doris punctuolata Doris vestita

= Diaulula punctuolata =

Species of gastropod

Diaulula punctuolata is a species of sea slug or dorid nudibranch, a marine gastropod mollusk in the family Discodorididae.

== Description ==
The maximum recorded body length is 100 mm.

== Ecology ==
Minimum recorded depth is 0 m. Maximum recorded depth is 100 m.
