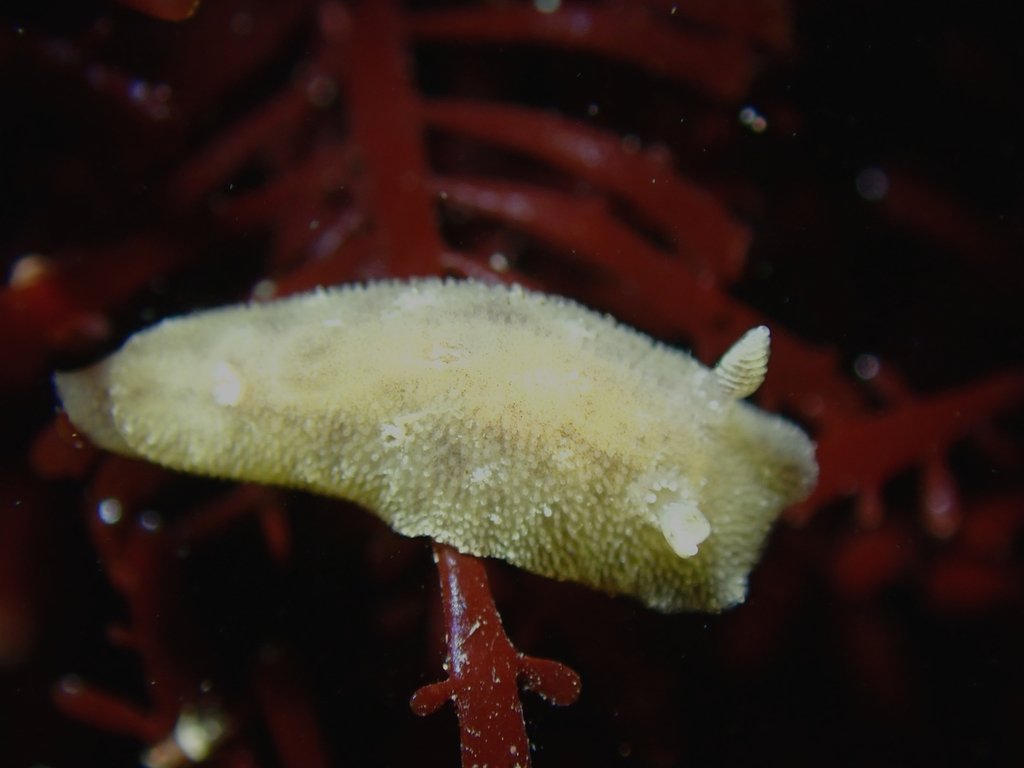

Scientific classification
- Kingdom: Animalia
- Phylum: Mollusca
- Class: Gastropoda
- Order: Nudibranchia
- Family: Discodorididae
- Genus: Peltodoris
- Species: P. punctifera

Binomial name
- Peltodoris punctifera (Abraham, 1877)

Synonyms
- “Montereina” punctifera (Abraham, 1877) · accepted, alternate representation; Doris orbignyi H. Adams & A. Adams, 1858 (Invalid: junior homonym of Doris orbignyi Férussac, 1822; Doris punctifera is a replacement name); Doris punctata d'Orbigny, 1839 (Invalid: junior homonym of Doris punctata Rüppell & Leuckart, 1831, and Doris punctata Quoy & Gaimard, 1832; Doris orbignyi H. & A. Adams, 1858, is a replacement name); Doris punctifera Abraham, 1877 (original combination)

= Peltodoris punctifera =

Species of gastropod

Peltodoris punctifera is a species of sea slug, a dorid nudibranch, shell-less marine gastropod mollusks in the family Discodorididae.

== Distribution ==
This marine species occurs off the coast of the Canary Islands.
