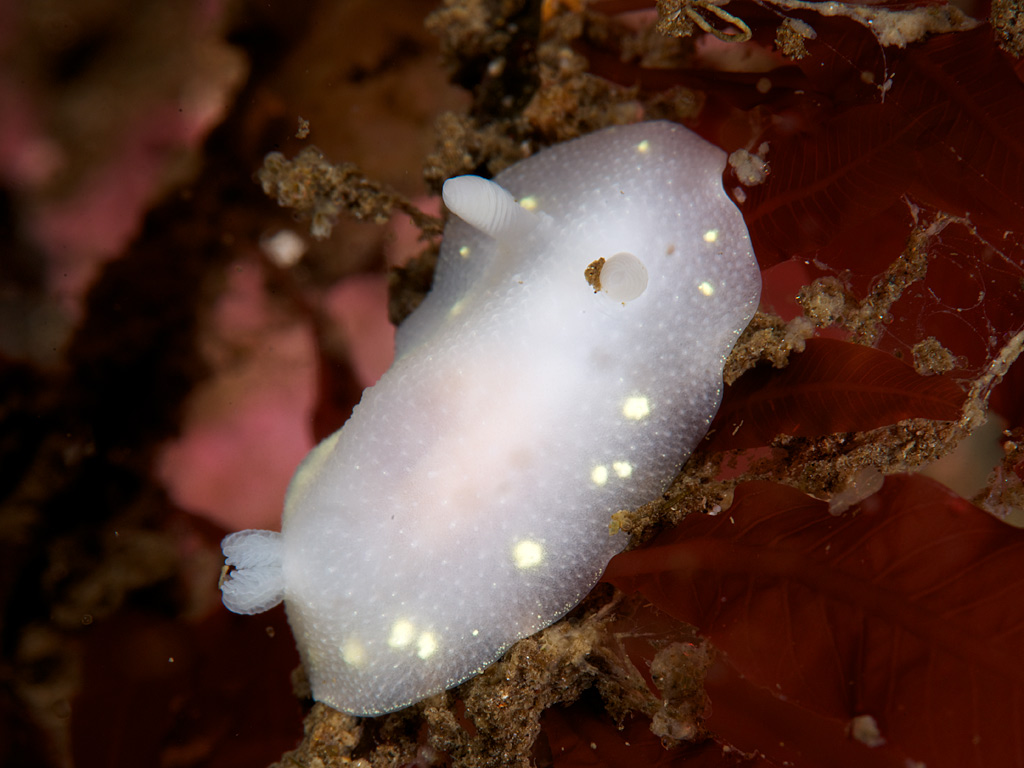
- Cadlina laevis, Norway

Scientific classification
- Kingdom: Animalia
- Phylum: Mollusca
- Class: Gastropoda
- Order: Nudibranchia
- Family: Cadlinidae
- Genus: Cadlina; Bergh, 1879

Synonyms
- Acanthochila Mörch, 1868 (invalid); Echinochila Mörch, 1869 (invalid); Inuda Er. Marcus & Ev. Marcus, 1967; Juanella Odhner, 1921

= Cadlina =

Genus of gastropods

Cadlina is a genus of sea slugs, dorid nudibranchs, shell-less marine gastropod mollusks historically classified in the family Chromodorididae. Recent research by R.F. Johnson in 2011 has shown that Cadlina does not belong to the family Chromodorididae. She has therefore brought back the name Cadlinidae from synonymy with Chromodorididae. The family Cadlinidae also includes the genus Aldisa Bergh, 1878.

== Species ==
Species in the genus Cadlina include:

- Cadlina abyssicola Valdés, 2001
- Cadlina affinis Odhner, 1934
- Cadlina bellburnellae Korshunova & Martynov, 2024
- Cadlina dubia Edmunds, 1981
- Cadlina excavata (Pruvot-Fol, 1951)
- Cadlina flavomaculata MacFarland, 1905 - Yellow-spot cadlina
- Cadlina georgiensis Schrödl, 2000
- Cadlina glabra Friele and Hansen, 1876
- Cadlina jannanicholsae Korshunova, Fletcher, Picton, Lundin, Kashio, N. Sanamyan, K. Sanamyan, Padula, Schrödl & Martynov, 2020 sp. nov.
- Cadlina japonica Baba, 1937
- Cadlina kamchatica Korshuniva et al. in Martynov et al., 2015
- Cadlina kerguelensis Thiele, 1912
- Cadlina klasmalmbergi Korshunova, Fletcher, Picton, Lundin, Kashio, N. Sanamyan, K. Sanamyan, Padula, Schrödl & Martynov, 2020 sp. nov.
- Cadlina laevis (Linnaeus, 1767) - White Atlantic cadlina type species
- Cadlina limbaughorum Lance, 1962
- Cadlina luarna (Er. Marcus & Ev. Marcus, 1967)
- Cadlina luteomarginata MacFarland, 1905 - Yellow-edged cadlina
- Cadlina magellanica Odhner, 1926
- Cadlina modesta MacFarland, 1966 - Modest cadlina
- Cadlina nigrobranchiata Rudman, 1985
- Cadlina olgae Chichvarkhin, 2016
- Cadlina pacifica Bergh, 1879
- Cadlina paninae Korshunova, Fletcher, Picton, Lundin, Kashio, N. Sanamyan, K. Sanamyan, Padula, Schrödl & Martynov, 2020 sp. nov.
- Cadlina pellucida (Risso, 1826)
- Cadlina rumia Er. Marcus, 1955
- Cadlina scabriuscula (Bergh, 1890)
- Cadlina sp. 1 saddled nudibranch
- Cadlina sp. 2 brown-dotted nudibranch
- Cadlina sparsa (Odhner, 1921) - Dark-spot cadlina
- Cadlina sylviaearleae Korshunova, Fletcher, Picton, Lundin, Kashio, N. Sanamyan, K. Sanamyan, Padula, Schrödl & Martynov, 2020 sp. nov.
- Cadlina tasmanica Rudman, 1990
- Cadlina umiushi Korshuniva et al. in Martynov et al., 2015
- Cadlina willani Miller, 1980

Species brought into synonymy

- Cadlina berghi Odhner, 1926 : synonym of Cadlina sparsa (Odhner, 1921)
- Cadlina burnayi Ortea, 1988 : synonym of Tyrinna burnayi (Ortea, 1988)
- Cadlina evelinae Marcus, 1958 : synonym of Tyrinna evelinae (Er. Marcus, 1958)
- Cadlina falklandica Odhner, 1926 : synonym of Cadlina magellanica Odhner, 1926
- Cadlina laevigata Odhner, 1926 : synonym of Cadlina sparsa (Odhner, 1921)
- Cadlina marginata MacFarland, 1905 - Yellow-edged cadlina : synonym of Cadlina luteomarginata McFarland, 1966
- Cadlina ornatissima Risbec, 1928 : synonym of Cadlinella ornatissima (Risbec, 1928)
