= Cadlina dubia =

Scientific classification
- Kingdom: Animalia
- Phylum: Mollusca
- Class: Gastropoda
- Order: Nudibranchia
- Family: Cadlinidae
- Genus: Cadlina
- Species: C. dubia

Binomial name
- Cadlina dubia Edmunds, 1981

Species of gastropod

Cadlina dubia is a species of sea slug or dorid nudibranch, a marine gastropod mollusk in the family Cadlinidae.

== Distribution ==
This species was described from two specimens found at 10 m depth off Tema, Ghana, 5.658°N 0.055°E.

== Description ==
Measuring 2 and 7 mm in length alive, the two animals found were creamy white in colour. The mantle surface is smooth with minute spicules projecting and scattered small white spots which probably mark the position of glands. The pinkish viscera can be seen through the semi-translucent mantle. There are nine cream coloured glands on each side on the 7 mm animal; with five on one side, six on the other of the 2 mm specimen. Cadlina dubia is very similar to Cadlina rumia but differs in the thicker, more opaque mantle without papillae and broader foot.
