= Cadlina glabra =

Scientific classification
- Kingdom: Animalia
- Phylum: Mollusca
- Class: Gastropoda
- Order: Nudibranchia
- Family: Cadlinidae
- Genus: Cadlina
- Species: C. glabra

Binomial name
- Cadlina glabra (Friele & Hansen, 1876)

Synonyms
- Doris glabra Friele & Hansen, 1876

Species of gastropod

Cadlina glabra is a species of sea slug or dorid nudibranch, a marine gastropod mollusk in the family Cadlinidae.

== Distribution ==
Only a single specimen was found at 365 m (1,198 ft) depth outside Florø, Norway.

== Description ==
This species is compared with Doris obvelata by the authors, a synonym of Cadlina laevis. Cadlina glabra is described as coloured white, with tentacles and gills yellow. No tubercles visible on the mantle even with magnification, but like Doris obvelata intense sulfur-yellow spots are scattered along the edges. The mantle does not extend far beyond the foot. The shape is an elongated oval. The liver shines through brown. Length 10mm. Radula formula 40.1.40 x 70 rows of teeth; their form very similar to Doris obvelata. It might be considered to be merely a deepwater variant of Doris obvelata; however, the complete lack of tubercles and the much greater number of teeth (Cadlina laevis has a formula of 23-24.1.23-24 x 67 in animals of 14–24 mm length) seem to justify its separation as a distinct species.
