= Thomas Everett Thompson =

British malacologist and embryologist

Thomas Everett Thompson (3 November 1933 – 1 January 1990) was a British malacologist and embryologist, known for his extensive studies on opisthobranch molluscs.

Thompson graduated from the University of Wales, Bangor, in 1954 and earned his PhD from the same university for research on dorid nudibranchs. He was awarded a D.Sc. in 1964. He was a Leverhulme Research Fellow, University of Liverpool, and a lecturer in zoology at University College of South Wales and Monmouthshire, before taking up a lectureship in zoology at the University of Bristol in 1963. He authored more than 115 scientific papers and books, including a two-volume Ray Society monograph on British opisthobranch molluscs.

== Taxa named after T.E. Thompson ==
- Chromodoris thompsoni Rudman, 1983
- Colpodaspis thompsoni G.H. Brown, 1979
- Cuthona thompsoni Garcia, Lopez-González & Garcia-Gomez, 1991
- Elysia thompsoni Jensen, 1993
- Loy thompsoni Millen & Nybakken, 1991
- Pseudovermis thompsoni Salvini-Plawen, 1991
- Glaucus thompsoni Churchill, Valdes & Foighil 2014
