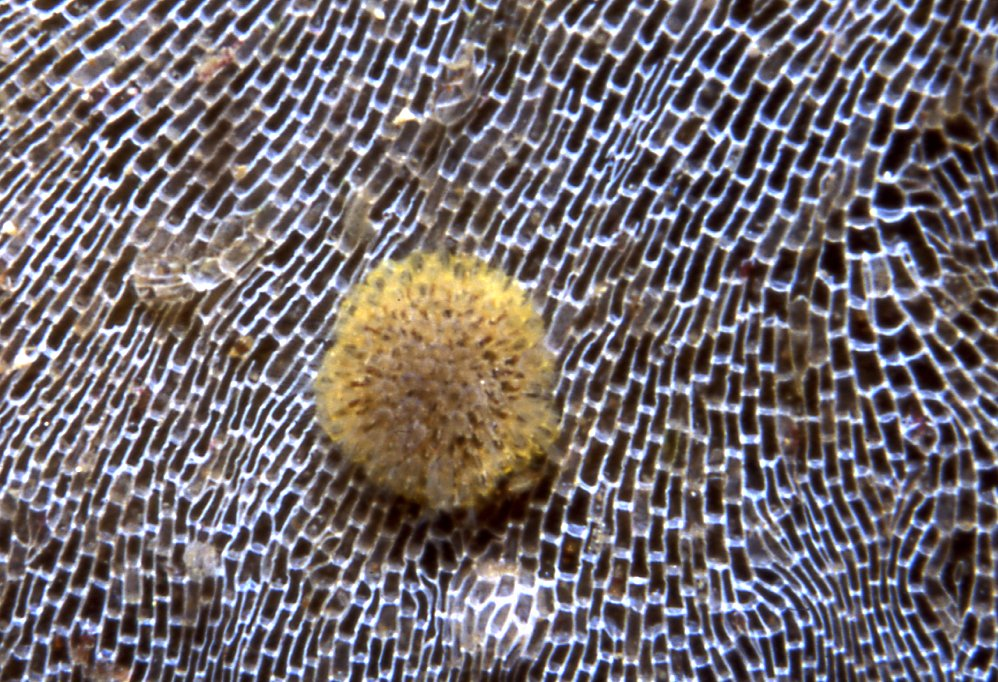
- The crazed nudibranch, Corambe sp.

Scientific classification
- Kingdom: Animalia
- Phylum: Mollusca
- Class: Gastropoda
- Order: Nudibranchia
- Family: Corambidae
- Genus: Corambe; Bergh, 1869

Type species
- Corambe sargassicola Bergh, 1871

Synonyms
- Corambella Balch, 1899; Doridella Verrill, 1870; Gulbinia Martynov, 1994; Neocorambe Swennen & R. Dekker, 1995; Paracorambe Swennen & R. Dekker, 1995; Quasicorambe Martynov, 1994; Suhinia Martynov, 1994

= Corambe =

Genus of gastropods

Corambe is a genus of sea slugs, dorid nudibranchs, marine gastropod molluscs in family Corambidae within the superfamily Onchidoridoidea.

Species in this genus show a characteristic posterior notch in the notum (which is lacking in some taxa) and a characteristic gill morphology, especially the presence of ventral gills.

== Habitat ==
These nudibranchs occur in littoral and sublittoral temperate waters of the northern and southern hemispheres.

== General description ==
They are mostly small (between 5 and 10 mm) and rather hard to find because they are very well camouflaged. They prey on encrusting bryozoans.

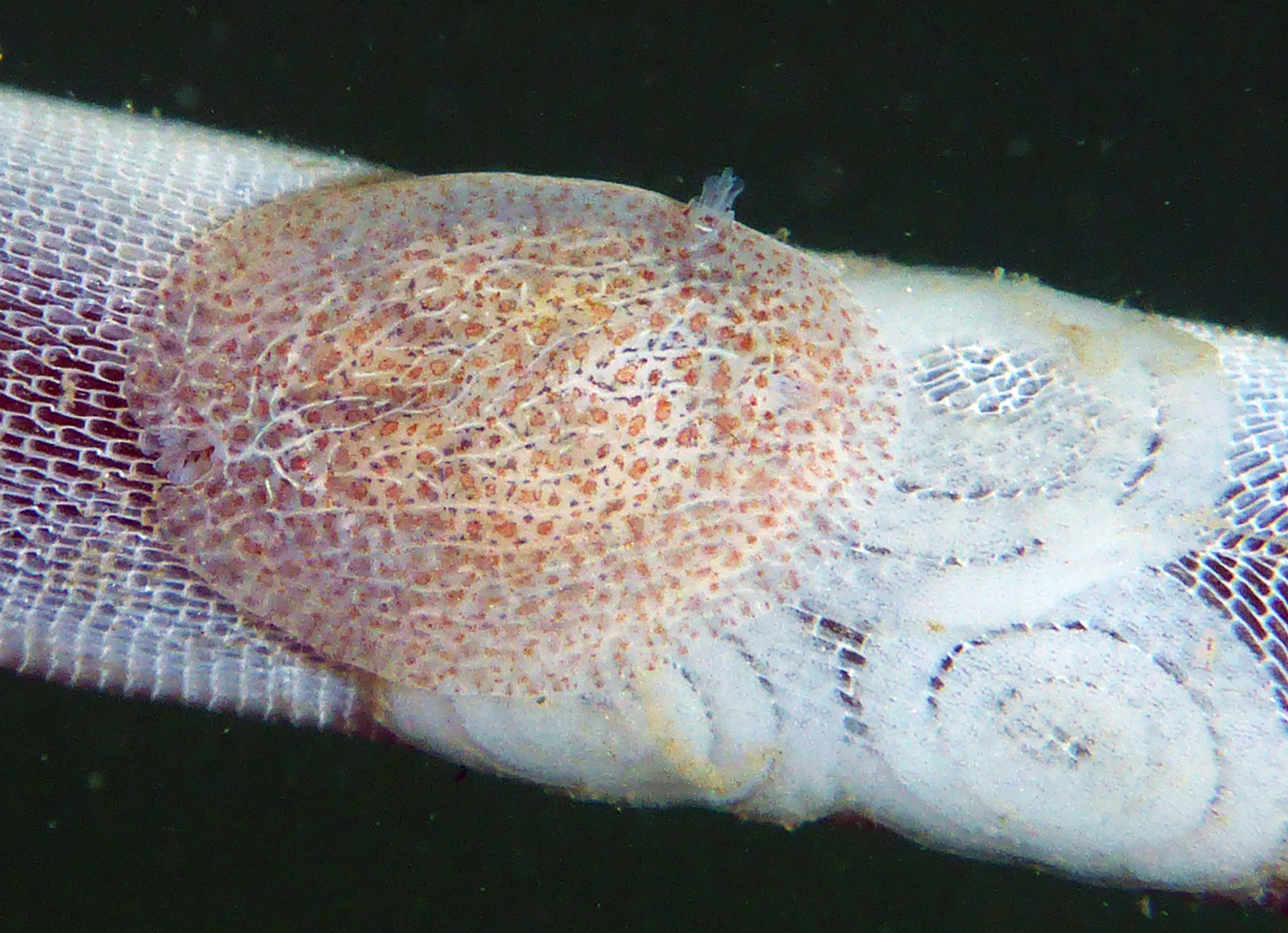
Corambe pacifica from Santa Cruz, California with egg spirals on bryozoan on giant kelp

== Species ==
Species within the genus Corambe include:

- Corambe burchi (Er. Marcus & Ev. Marcus, 1967)
- Corambe carambola Er. Marcus, 1955
- Corambe evelinae Er. Marcus, 1958
- Corambe lucea Er. Marcus, 1959
- Corambe mancorensis Martynov, Brenzinger, Hooker & Schrödl, 2011
- Corambe obscura (A. E. Verrill, 1870)
- Corambe osculabundus Ortea & Caballer, 2018
- Corambe pacifica MacFarland & O'Donoghue, 1929
- Corambe sp. crazed nudibranch
- Corambe steinbergae (Lance, 1962) (synonym of Doridella steinbergae (Lance, 1962))
- Corambe testudinaria H. Fischer, 1889

== Species synonymised or transferred to other genera ==
- Corambe baratariae (Harry, 1953): synonym of Corambe obscura
- Corambe batava Kerbert, 1886: synonym of Corambe obscura (A. E. Verrill, 1870)
- Corambe depressa Adams, 1847
- Corambe fusca Adams, 1847
- Corambe sargassicola Bergh, 1871 (type species): synonym of Corambe obscura
- Corambe thompsoni Millen & Nybakken, 1991: synonym of Loy thompsoni (Millen & Nybakken, 1991)

In 1994 it became a synonym of Psammodoris thompsoni (Millen & Nybakken, 1991) and in 1998 synonym of Loy thompsoni (Millen & Nybakken, 1991).
