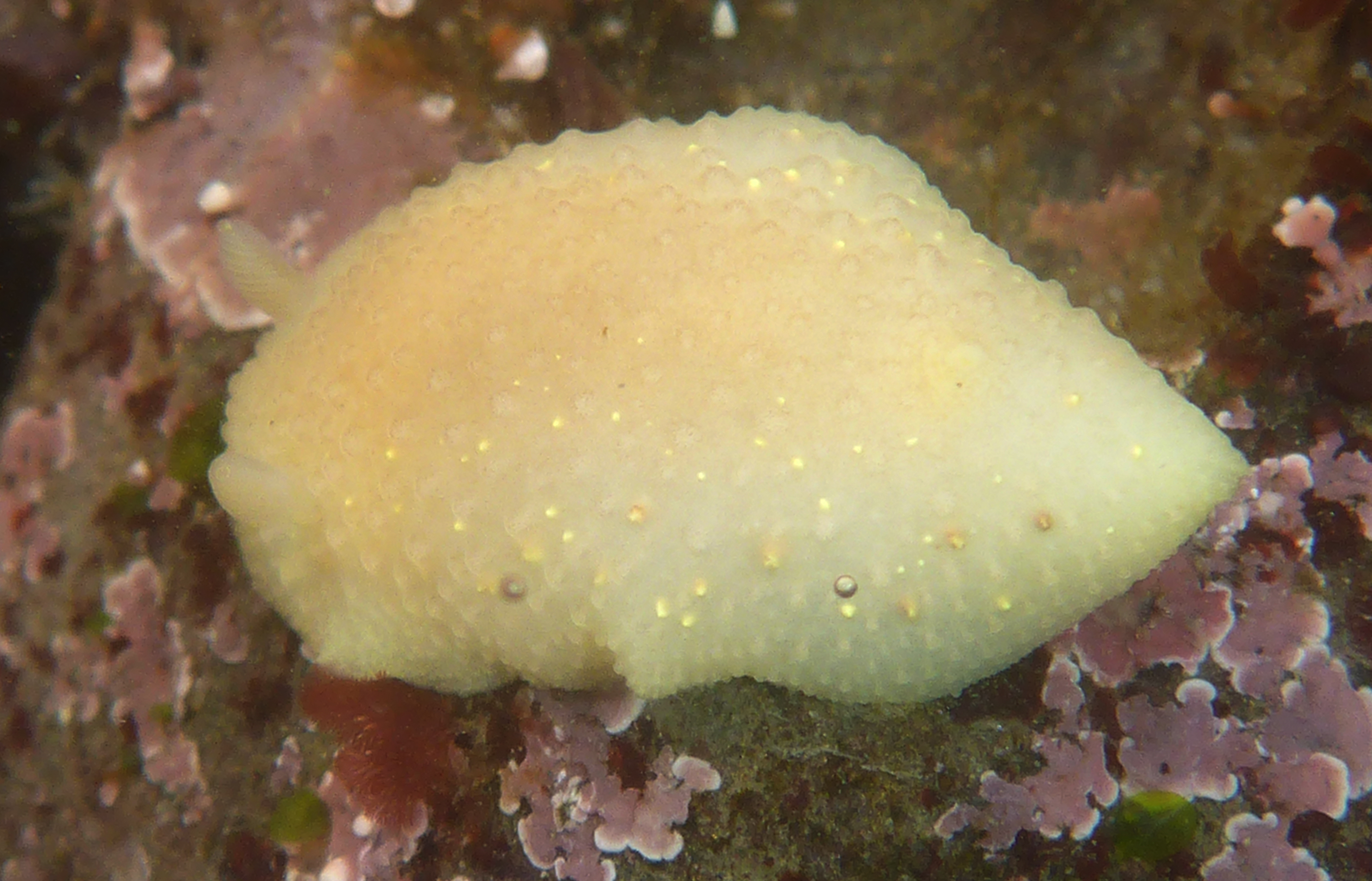
- Cadlina sparsa from Pillar Point, California

Scientific classification
- Kingdom: Animalia
- Phylum: Mollusca
- Class: Gastropoda
- Order: Nudibranchia
- Family: Cadlinidae
- Genus: Cadlina
- Species: C. sparsa

Binomial name
- Cadlina sparsa (Odhner, 1921)

= Cadlina sparsa =

Species of gastropod

Cadlina sparsa, common name the dark-spot cadlina, is a species of sea slug or dorid nudibranch, a marine gastropod mollusk in the family Cadlinidae.

== Description ==
The maximum recorded body length is 10 mm.

== Ecology ==
Minimum recorded depth is 2 m. Maximum recorded depth is 8 m.
