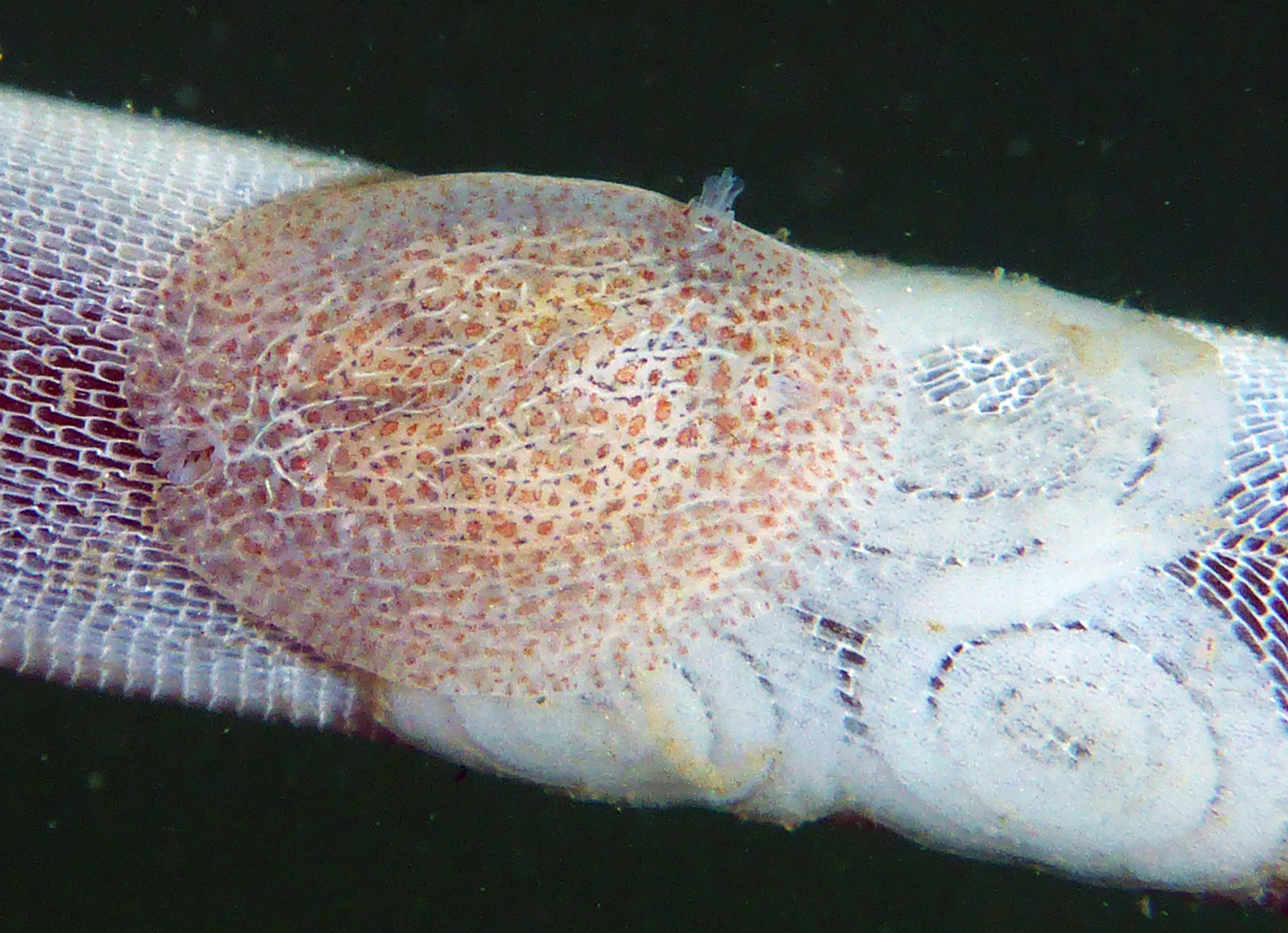
- Corambe pacifica from Santa Cruz, California with egg spirals on bryozoan on giant kelp

Scientific classification
- Kingdom: Animalia
- Phylum: Mollusca
- Class: Gastropoda
- Order: Nudibranchia
- Family: Corambidae
- Genus: Corambe
- Species: C. pacifica

Binomial name
- Corambe pacifica MacFarland & O'Donoghue, 1929

Synonyms
- Quasicorambe pacifica (MacFarland & O'Donoghue, 1929)

= Corambe pacifica =

Species of gastropod

Corambe pacifica, the Pacific corambe, is a species of sea slug, an Eastern Pacific Ocean nudibranch, a marine, opisthobranch gastropod mollusk in the family Corambidae.

This species feeds on bryozoans.

== Distribution ==
Corambe pacifica are found on the west coast of North America.
