= Cadlina kamchatica =

Scientific classification
- Kingdom: Animalia
- Phylum: Mollusca
- Class: Gastropoda
- Order: Nudibranchia
- Suborder: Doridina
- Infraorder: Doridoidei
- Superfamily: Doridoidea
- Family: Cadlinidae
- Genus: Cadlina
- Species: C. kamchatica

Binomial name
- Cadlina kamchatica Korshunova, Picton, Sanamyan & Martynov, 2015

Species of gastropod

Cadlina kamchatica is a species of sea snail, a marine gastropod mollusk, in the family Cadlinidae. It is found of the coast of Russia.
