= Hancockia =

Hancockia may refer to:

- Hancockia (gastropod), a genus of molluscs in the family Hancockiidae
- Hancockia (plant), a genus of plants in the family Orchidaceae
