= Cadlina scabriuscula =

Scientific classification
- Kingdom: Animalia
- Phylum: Mollusca
- Class: Gastropoda
- Order: Nudibranchia
- Family: Cadlinidae
- Genus: Cadlina
- Species: C. scabriuscula

Binomial name
- Cadlina scabriuscula (Bergh, 1890)

Species of gastropod

Cadlina scabriuscula is a species of sea slug or dorid nudibranch, a marine gastropod mollusc in the family Cadlinidae.

== Description ==
The maximum recorded body length is 12 mm.

== Ecology ==
The minimum recorded depth is 68 m. Maximum recorded depth is 68 m.
