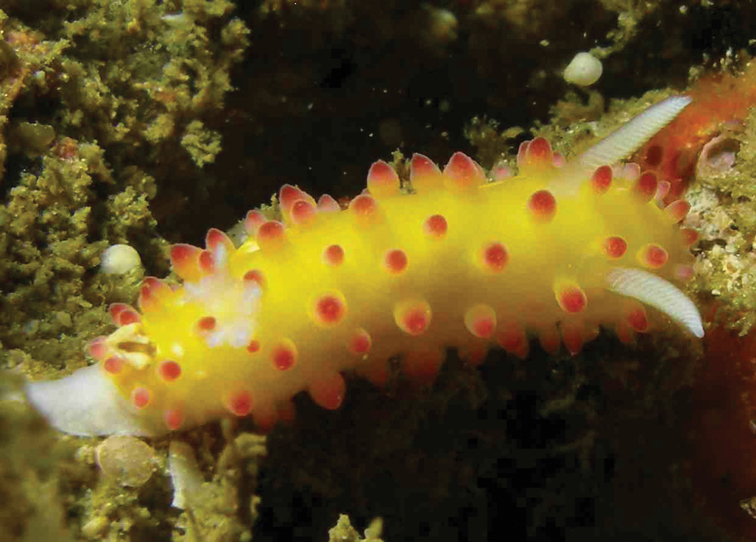
- Cadlinella ornatissima

Scientific classification
- Kingdom: Animalia
- Phylum: Mollusca
- Class: Gastropoda
- Order: Nudibranchia
- Family: Chromodorididae
- Genus: Cadlinella; Thiele, 1931

= Cadlinella =

Genus of gastropods

Cadlinella is a genus of colourful sea slugs, specifically dorid nudibranchs, shell-less marine gastropod mollusks in the family Chromodorididae.

== Species ==
This genus includes the following species:

- Cadlinella hirsuta Rudman, 1995
- Cadlinella ornatissima Risbec, 1928
- Cadlinella subornatissima Baba, 1996

Species brought into synonymy

- Cadlinella japonica (Baba, 1937) : synonym of Cadlina japonica Baba, 1937
- Cadlinella sagamiensis (Baba, 1937) : synonym of Showajidaia sagamiensis (Baba, 1937)
