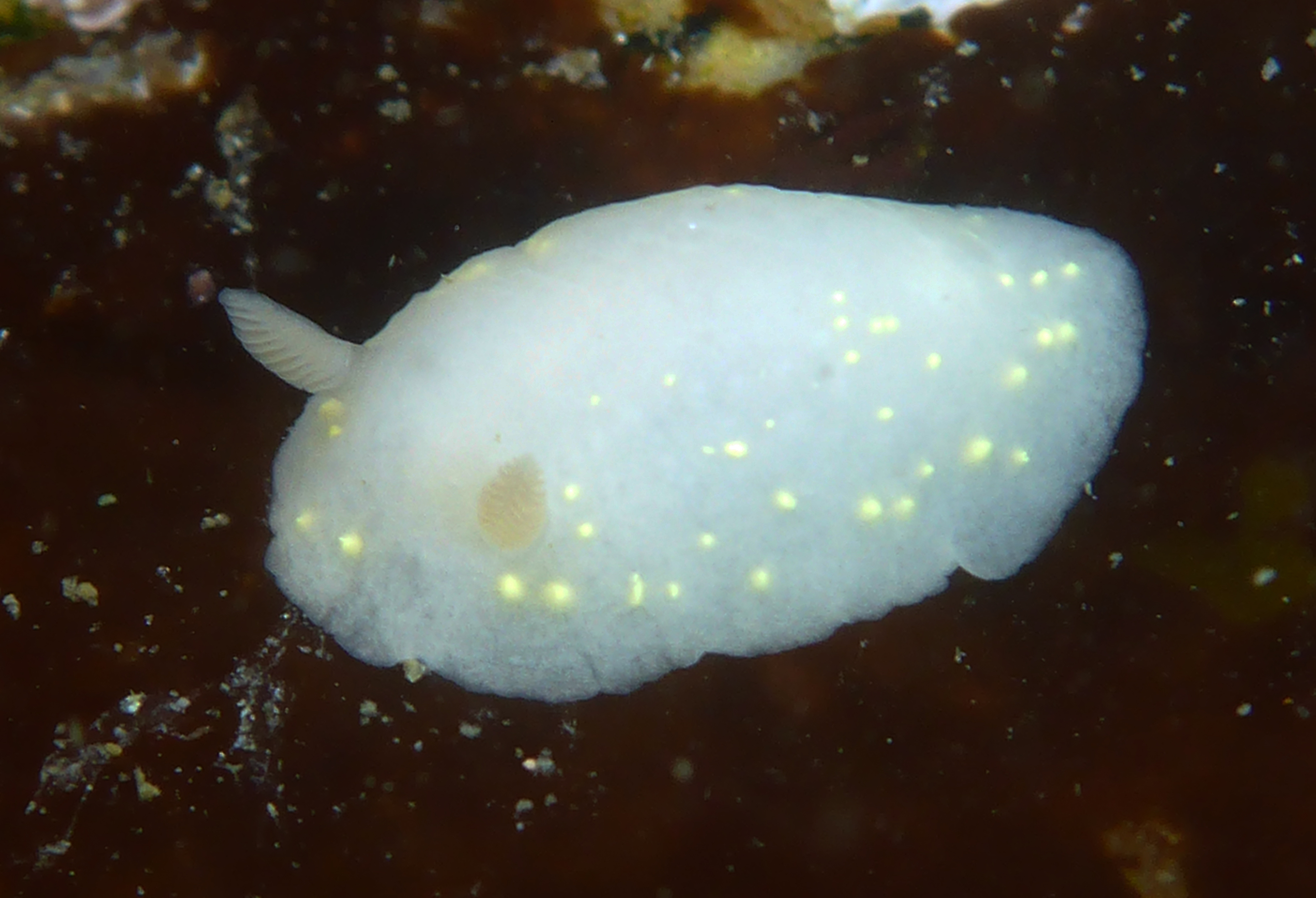
- From Point Pinos, California

Scientific classification
- Kingdom: Animalia
- Phylum: Mollusca
- Class: Gastropoda
- Order: Nudibranchia
- Family: Cadlinidae
- Genus: Cadlina
- Species: C. modesta

Binomial name
- Cadlina modesta MacFarland, 1966

= Cadlina modesta =

Modest cadlina

Species of gastropod

Cadlina modesta, common name the modest cadlina, is a species of sea slug or dorid nudibranch, a marine gastropod mollusc in the family Cadlinidae.

== Distribution ==
This species was described from Point Pinos, California. It is reported from Point Lena, Juneau, Alaska to Isla Guadalupe, Baja California, Mexico.

== Description ==
The size of the body attains 35 mm.
