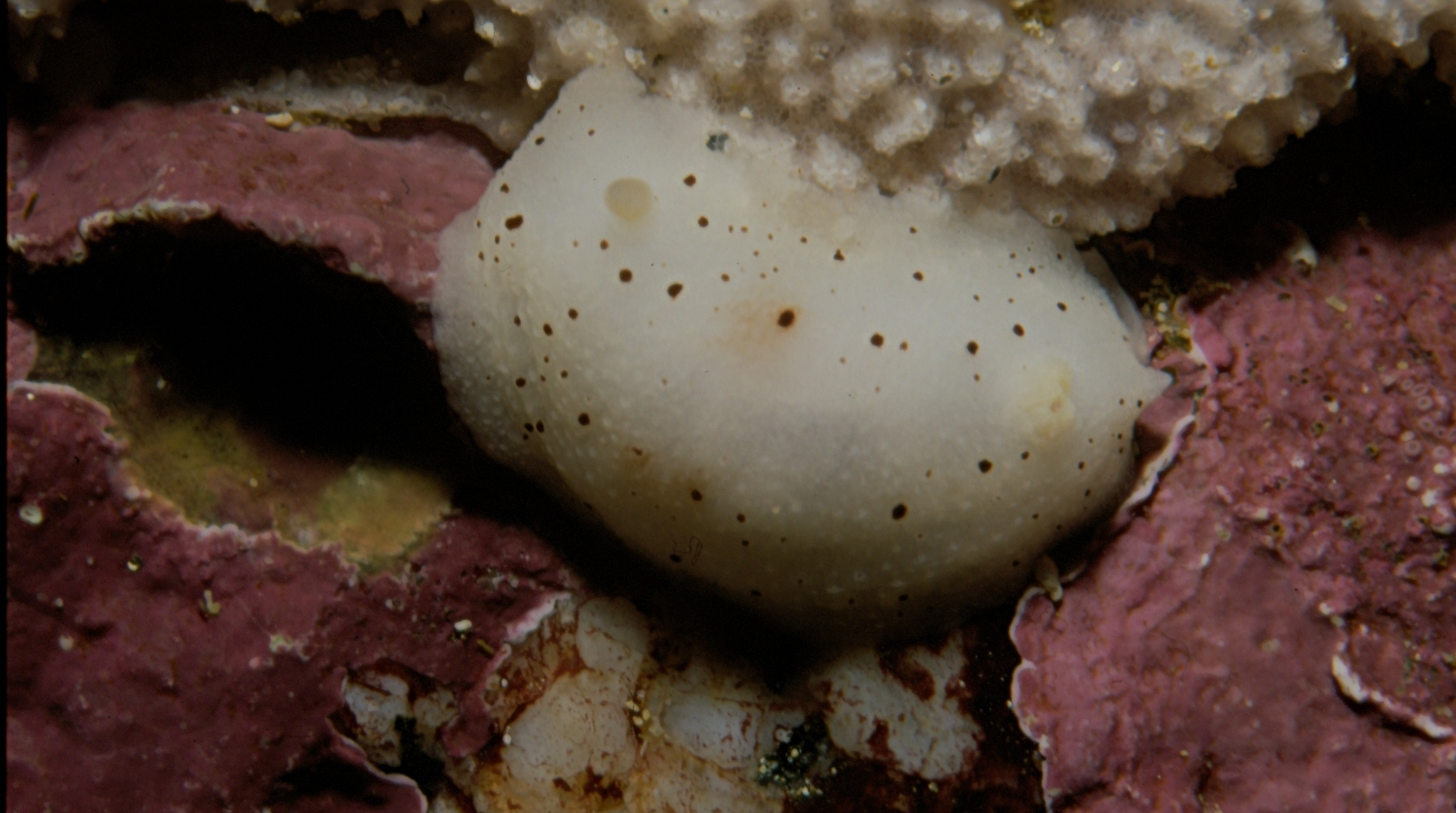

Scientific classification
- Kingdom: Animalia
- Phylum: Mollusca
- Class: Gastropoda
- Order: Nudibranchia
- Family: Cadlinidae
- Genus: Cadlina
- Species: C. sp.2

Binomial name
- Cadlina sp.2

= Brown-dotted nudibranch =

Brown-dotted nudibranch Cadlina sp.2

Species of gastropod

The brown-dotted nudibranch, Cadlina sp.2, as designated by Gosliner, 1987, is a species of colourful sea slug, a dorid nudibranch. It is a marine gastropod mollusc in the family Cadlinidae.

== Distribution ==
This species has so far only been found around the southern African coast on both sides of the Cape Peninsula intertidally to 30 m. It remained undescribed by science as at November 2009 and is probably endemic.

== Description ==
The brown-dotted nudibranch is a pale-bodied dorid with scattered brown dots over the notum. It also has several marginal opaque white spots. It may reach a total length of 25 mm.

== Ecology ==
This species feeds on sponges.
