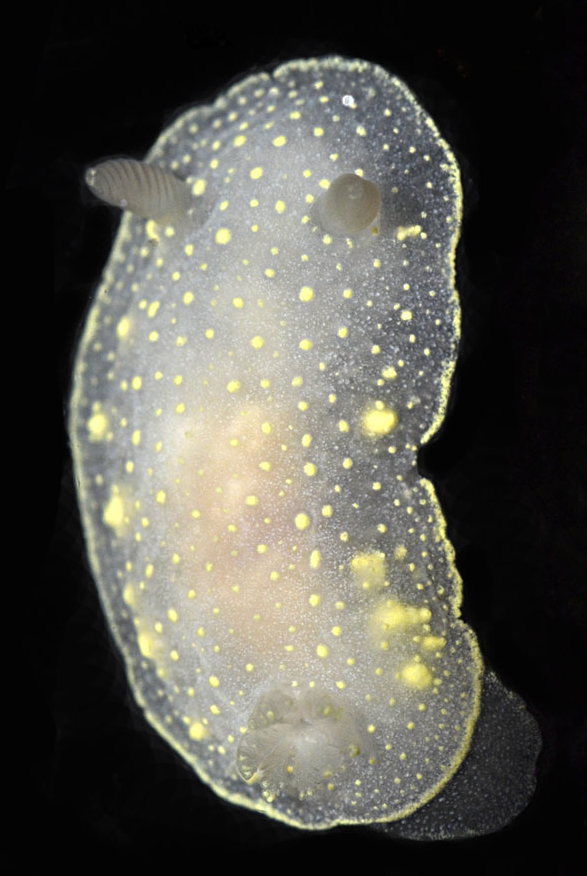
- Cadlina olgae (10.7717-peerj.2774) Figure 3

Scientific classification
- Kingdom: Animalia
- Phylum: Mollusca
- Class: Gastropoda
- Order: Nudibranchia
- Suborder: Doridina
- Infraorder: Doridoidei
- Superfamily: Doridoidea
- Family: Cadlinidae
- Genus: Cadlina
- Species: C. umiushi

Binomial name
- Cadlina umiushi Korshunova, Picton, Sanamyan & Martynov, 2015

= Cadlina umiushi =

Species of gastropod

Cadlina umiushi is a species of sea snail, a marine gastropod mollusk, in the family Cadlinidae.
