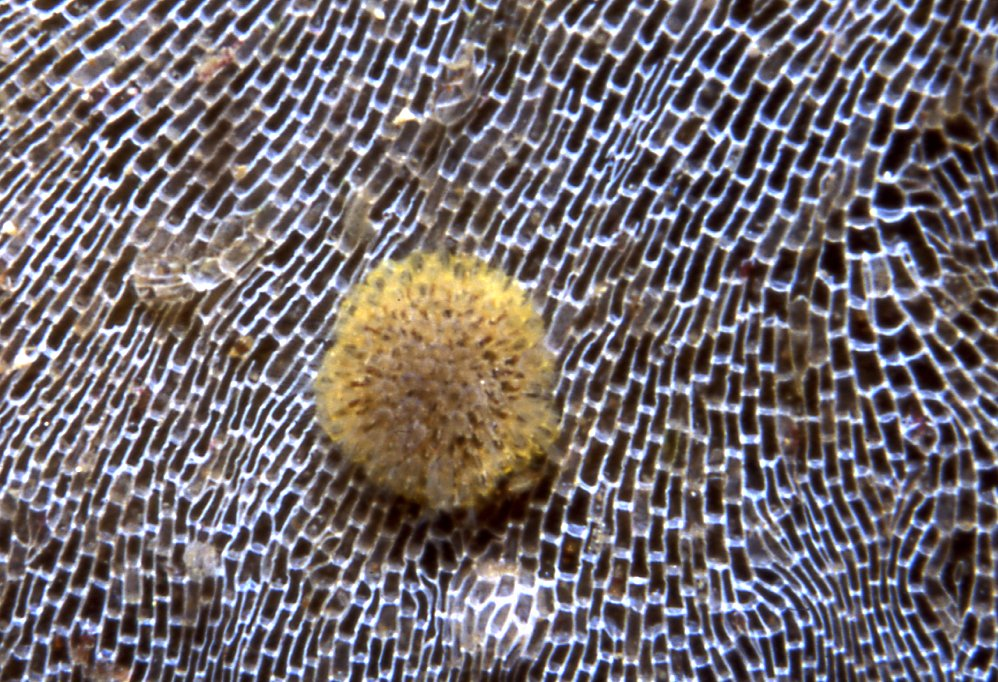

Scientific classification
- Domain: Eukaryota
- Kingdom: Animalia
- Phylum: Mollusca
- Class: Gastropoda
- Order: Nudibranchia
- Superfamily: Onchidoridoidea
- Family: Corambidae
- Genus: Corambe
- Species: C. sp.

Binomial name
- Corambe sp.

= Crazed nudibranch =

Species of gastropod

The crazed nudibranch, Corambe sp., as designated by Gosliner, 1987, is a species of sea slug, a dorid nudibranch, a marine gastropod mollusc in the superfamily Onchidoridoidea. It is also known as the moss animal nudibranch because its usual prey is a bryozoan, or moss animal. As at November 2009, it remained undescribed by science.

== Distribution ==
This species is probably endemic to the South African coast and is found off the western shore of False Bay in 10–20 m of water.

== Description ==
The crazed nudibranch is a very small (less than 10mm) round nudibranch, which is extremely well camouflaged to match the bryozoan it preys on. Its rhinophores and gills are hardly visible and its body is covered with opaque lines.

== Ecology ==
The crazed nudibranch feeds on the rectangular membranous lace animal, Membranipora membranacea, which lives on broad bladed kelp. Its egg mass is a well camouflaged broad flat spiral.
