= Cadlina kerguelensis =

Scientific classification
- Kingdom: Animalia
- Phylum: Mollusca
- Class: Gastropoda
- Order: Nudibranchia
- Family: Cadlinidae
- Genus: Cadlina
- Species: C. kerguelensis

Binomial name
- Cadlina kerguelensis Thiele, 1912

Species of gastropod

Cadlina kerguelensis is a species of sea slug or dorid nudibranch, a marine gastropod mollusk in the family Cadlinidae. It is found in the French Southern Territories.
