= Cadlina pacifica =

Scientific classification
- Kingdom: Animalia
- Phylum: Mollusca
- Class: Gastropoda
- Order: Nudibranchia
- Family: Cadlinidae
- Genus: Cadlina
- Species: C. pacifica

Binomial name
- Cadlina pacifica Bergh, 1879

Species of gastropod

Cadlina pacifica is a species of sea slug or dorid nudibranch, a marine gastropod mollusk in the family Cadlinidae.
