= Cadlina magellanica =

Scientific classification
- Kingdom: Animalia
- Phylum: Mollusca
- Class: Gastropoda
- Order: Nudibranchia
- Family: Cadlinidae
- Genus: Cadlina
- Species: C. magellanica

Binomial name
- Cadlina magellanica Odhner, 1926

Species of gastropod

Cadlina magellanica is a species of sea slug or dorid nudibranch, a marine gastropod mollusk in the family Cadlinidae.

== Description ==
The maximum recorded body length is 8 mm.

== Ecology ==
Minimum recorded depth is 16 m. Maximum recorded depth is 270 m.
