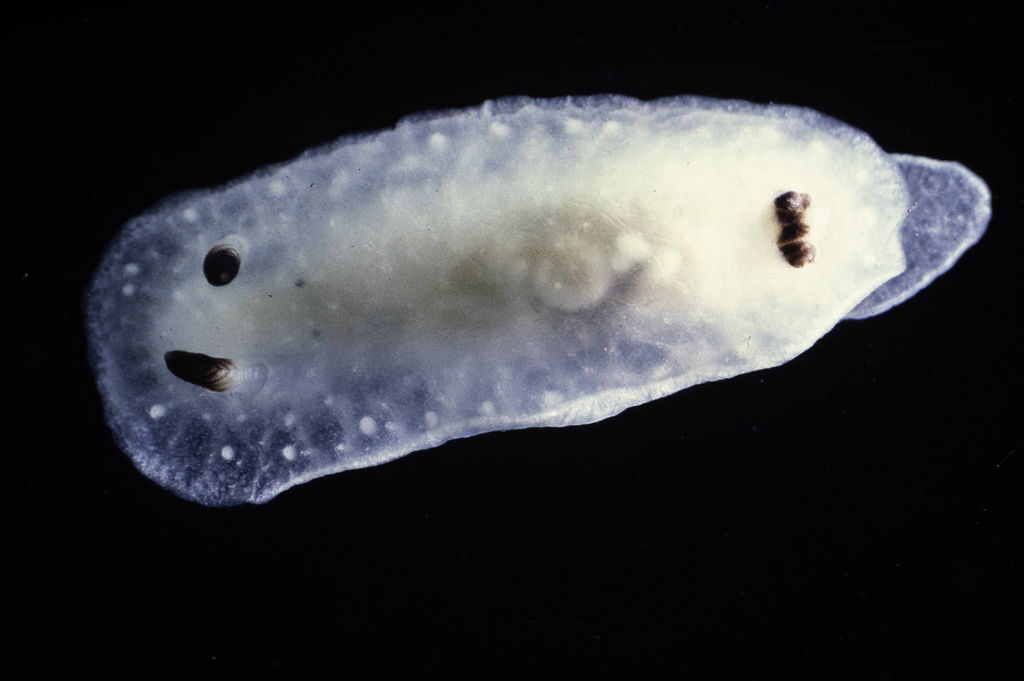

Scientific classification
- Kingdom: Animalia
- Phylum: Mollusca
- Class: Gastropoda
- Order: Nudibranchia
- Family: Cadlinidae
- Genus: Cadlina
- Species: C. pellucida

Binomial name
- Cadlina pellucida (Risso, 1826)

= Cadlina pellucida =

Species of gastropod

Cadlina pellucida is a species of sea slug or dorid nudibranch, a marine gastropod mollusk in the family Cadlinidae.
