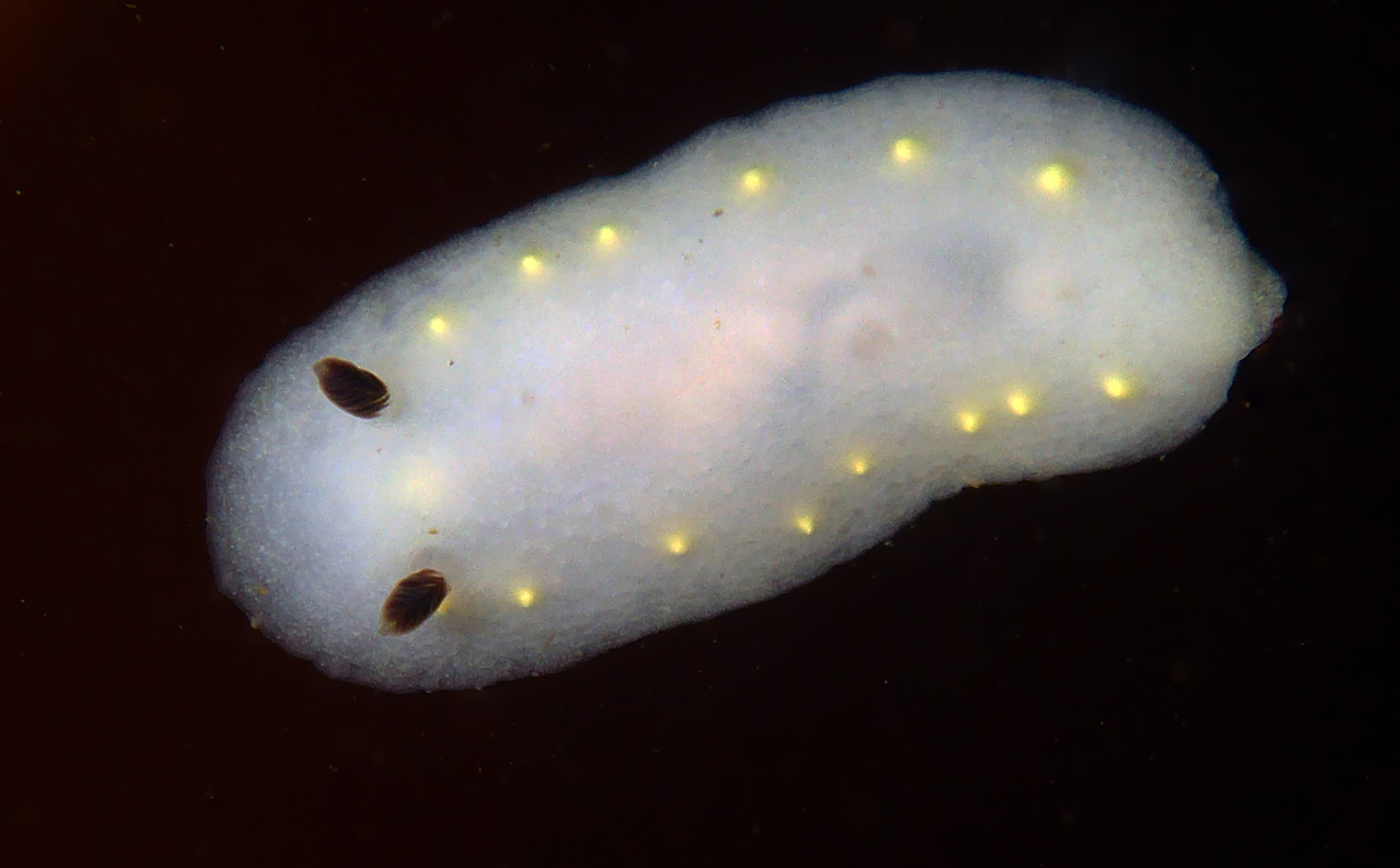
- Cadlina flavomaculata from Point Pinos, California

Scientific classification
- Kingdom: Animalia
- Phylum: Mollusca
- Class: Gastropoda
- Order: Nudibranchia
- Family: Cadlinidae
- Genus: Cadlina
- Species: C. flavomaculata

Binomial name
- Cadlina flavomaculata MacFarland, 1905

= Cadlina flavomaculata =

Yellow-spot cadlina

Species of gastropod

Cadlina flavomaculata, common name the yellow-spot cadlina, is a species of colourful sea slug, a dorid nudibranch, a shell-less marine gastropod mollusk in the family Cadlinidae.

== Distribution ==
Cadlina flavomaculata is a relatively rare nudibranch found in subtidal and intertidal zones of the northeastern Pacific, from Vancouver Island to the southern tip of Baja California. However, it is common in some diving sites between Monterey, Carmel and Big Sur.

== Description ==
The yellow-spot cadlina is charactered by its ovate, translucent, white mantle with distinctive, brown to black rhinophores. A series of large, yellow spots (mantle glands) can be seen on each side of the mantle. Some reported specimens also show a yellow border to the mantle, but this is not found in all individuals. The color of branchia (gills) is white to yellow. Its reported length is 15 mm.

== Ecology ==
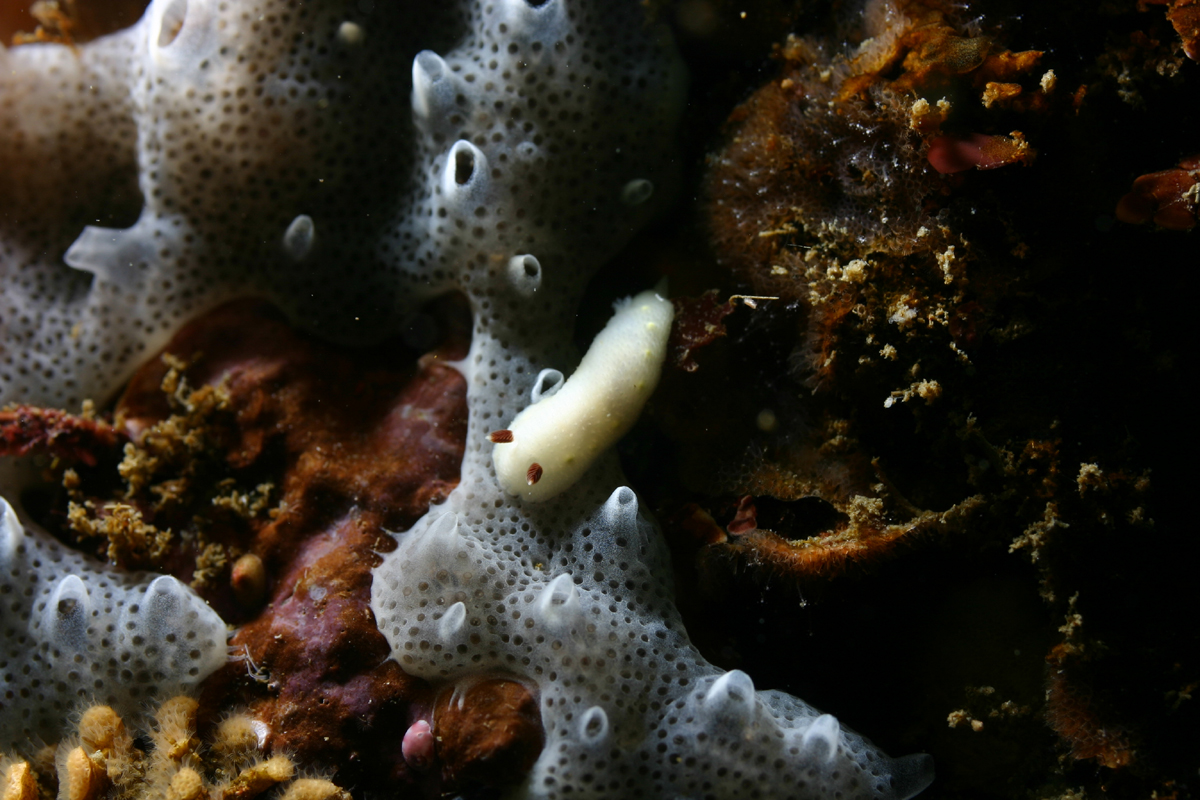
Cadlina flavomaculata in situ.

Cadlina flavomaculata feeds on the sponge Aplysilla glacialis.
