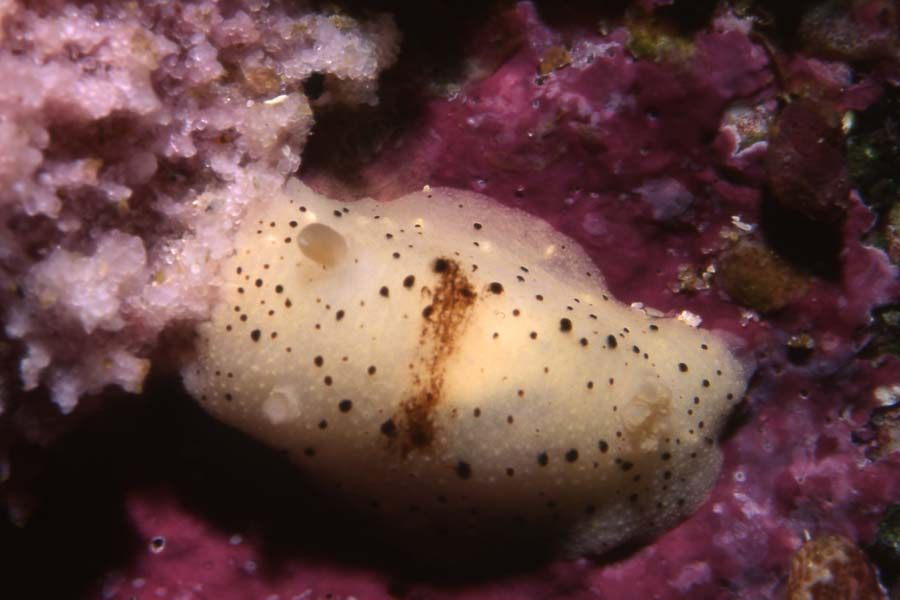

Scientific classification
- Kingdom: Animalia
- Phylum: Mollusca
- Class: Gastropoda
- Order: Nudibranchia
- Family: Cadlinidae
- Genus: Cadlina
- Species: C. sp.1

Binomial name
- Cadlina sp.1

= Saddled nudibranch =

Species of gastropod

The saddled nudibranch, scientific name Cadlina sp.1 as designated by Gosliner, 1987, is a species of colourful sea slug, a dorid nudibranch. It is a marine gastropod mollusc in the family Cadlinidae.

== Distribution ==
This species has so far only been found around the southern African coast in False Bay off the Cape Peninsula from Buffels Bay to Rooi Els, subtidally to 20 m. It remains undescribed by science as at November 2009 and is probably endemic.

== Description ==
The saddled nudibranch is a pale-bodied dorid with a brownish saddle-shaped band across the middle of its back and scattered black spots over the notum. The saddle may be continuous or fade in the middle. This animal may reach a total length of 30 mm.

== Ecology ==
This species feeds on sponges.
