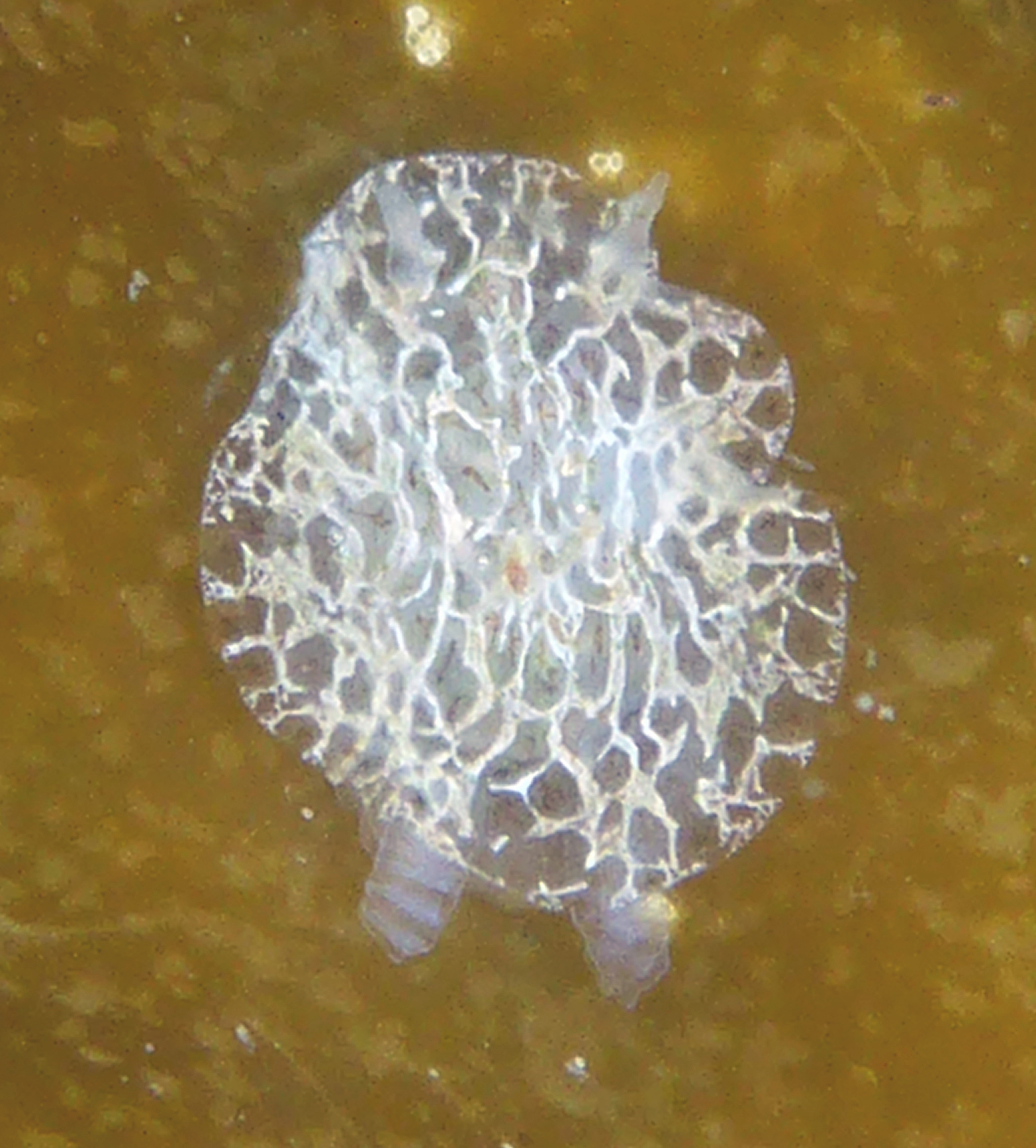
- Corambe steinbergae from Santa Cruz, California. Note the lack of posterior notch in the mantle skirt

Scientific classification
- Kingdom: Animalia
- Phylum: Mollusca
- Class: Gastropoda
- Order: Nudibranchia
- Family: Corambidae
- Genus: Corambe
- Species: C. steinbergae

Binomial name
- Corambe steinbergae MacFarland & O'Donoghue, 1929

Synonyms
- Corambella bolini MacFarland, 1966; Corambella steinbergae Lance, 1962 (original combination); Doridella steinbergae Lance, 1962 (original combination)

= Corambe steinbergae =

Species of gastropod

Corambe steinbergae is a species of sea slug, an Eastern Pacific Ocean nudibranch, a marine, opisthobranch gastropod mollusk in the family Corambidae.

This species feeds on bryozoans.

== Distribution ==
This marine species occurs in the Northeastern Pacific from Alaska to Baja California, Mexico.
