= Cadlina affinis =

Scientific classification
- Kingdom: Animalia
- Phylum: Mollusca
- Class: Gastropoda
- Order: Nudibranchia
- Family: Cadlinidae
- Genus: Cadlina
- Species: C. affinis

Binomial name
- Cadlina affinis Odhner, 1934

Species of gastropod

Cadlina affinis is a species of sea slug or dorid nudibranch, a marine gastropod mollusk in the family Cadlinidae.

== Distribution ==
This species was described from four specimens trawled at McMurdo Sound at the following positions 76°56′S 164°12′E, 293 m., 77°46′S 166°8′E, 547 m. and off Granite Harbour, entrance to McMurdo Sound, 92 m.
