= Cadlina abyssicola =

Scientific classification
- Kingdom: Animalia
- Phylum: Mollusca
- Class: Gastropoda
- Order: Nudibranchia
- Family: Cadlinidae
- Genus: Cadlina
- Species: C. abyssicola

Binomial name
- Cadlina abyssicola Valdés, 2001

Species of gastropod

Cadlina abyssicola is a species of sea slug or dorid nudibranch, a marine gastropod mollusk in the family Cadlinidae.

== Distribution ==
This species was described from deep water in New Caledonia. The holotype was collected at 394–397 m (1,293–1,302 ft) 20°54′S 165°53′E, and 12 paratypes were collected at depths of 270–570 m (890–1,870 ft) in the area.
