= Cadlinella subornatissima =

Scientific classification
- Kingdom: Animalia
- Phylum: Mollusca
- Class: Gastropoda
- Order: Nudibranchia
- Family: Chromodorididae
- Genus: Cadlinella
- Species: C. subornatissima

Binomial name
- Cadlinella subornatissima Baba, 1996

Species of gastropod

Cadlinella subornatissima is a species of sea slug or dorid nudibranch, a marine gastropod mollusk in the family Chromodorididae.

== Distribution ==
This species was described from Japan. It has been found in South Korea and the Marshall Islands.

== Description ==
Cadlinella subornatissima is similar to the common species Cadlinella ornatissima but has taller tubercles which are entirely white, not tipped with pink.
