= Cadlina excavata =

Scientific classification
- Kingdom: Animalia
- Phylum: Mollusca
- Class: Gastropoda
- Order: Nudibranchia
- Family: Cadlinidae
- Genus: Cadlina
- Species: C. excavata

Binomial name
- Cadlina excavata (Pruvot-Fol, 1951)

Synonyms
- Echinochila excavata Pruvot-Fol, 1951

Species of gastropod

Cadlina excavata is a species of sea slug or dorid nudibranch, a marine gastropod mollusk in the family Cadlinidae.

== Distribution ==
This species was described from the Mediterranean Sea.
