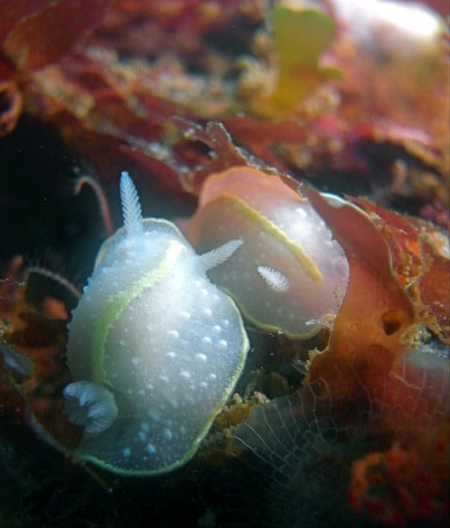

Scientific classification
- Kingdom: Animalia
- Phylum: Mollusca
- Class: Gastropoda
- Order: Nudibranchia
- Family: Cadlinidae
- Genus: Cadlina
- Species: C. willani

Binomial name
- Cadlina willani Miller, 1980

= Cadlina willani =

Species of gastropod

Cadlina willani is a species of sea slug or dorid nudibranch, a marine gastropod mollusk in the family Cadlinidae. The species is named for the renowned nudibranch taxonomist Dr. Richard C. Willan.
