= Cadlinella hirsuta =

Scientific classification
- Kingdom: Animalia
- Phylum: Mollusca
- Class: Gastropoda
- Order: Nudibranchia
- Family: Chromodorididae
- Genus: Cadlinella
- Species: C. hirsuta

Binomial name
- Cadlinella hirsuta Rudman, 1995

Species of gastropod

Cadlinella hirsuta is a species of sea slug or dorid nudibranch, a marine gastropod mollusk in the family Chromodorididae.

== Distribution ==
This species was described from New Caledonia.
