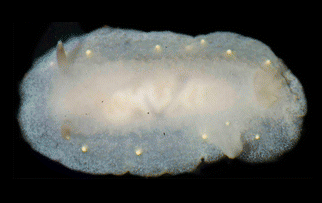
- Dorsal view of Cadlina rumia

Scientific classification
- Kingdom: Animalia
- Phylum: Mollusca
- Class: Gastropoda
- Order: Nudibranchia
- Family: Cadlinidae
- Genus: Cadlina
- Species: C. rumia

Binomial name
- Cadlina rumia Er. Marcus, 1955

= Cadlina rumia =

Species of gastropod

Cadlina rumia is a species of sea slug or dorid nudibranch, a marine gastropod mollusk in the family Cadlinidae.

== Distribution ==
Distribution of Cadlina rumia is amphiatlantic (occurring in Western Atlantic and in Eastern Atlantic). Distribution in Western Atlantic includes: Florida, Belize, Panama, Venezuela, Bahamas, Dominican Republic, Jamaica, Puerto Rico, Curaçao, St. Maarten/St. Martin, St. Lucia, St. Vincent & the Grenadines, Grenada, Brazil and Panama. This is the only species of Cadlina in the tropical western Atlantic. Distribution in Eastern Atlantic includes: ...

== Description ==
Its body is oval and flat, covered with numerous small tubercles. The background color is usually translucent white with a few yellow spots (mantle glands). Rhinophores and gills are often yellowish brown. It is up to 15 mm long.

== Ecology ==
Minimum and maximum recorded depth is 0 m. Cadlina rumia was found under rocks and on various sponges. This species feeds on several types of sponges from different orders (including spiculate and non-spiculate species), exhibiting a not specialized diet preference among the spongivorous dorid nudibranchs. Prey of Cadlina rumia include sponges Dysidea etheria, Haliclona sp., Callyspongia sp. and Scopalina sp.
