= Frank Mace MacFarland =

American malacologist

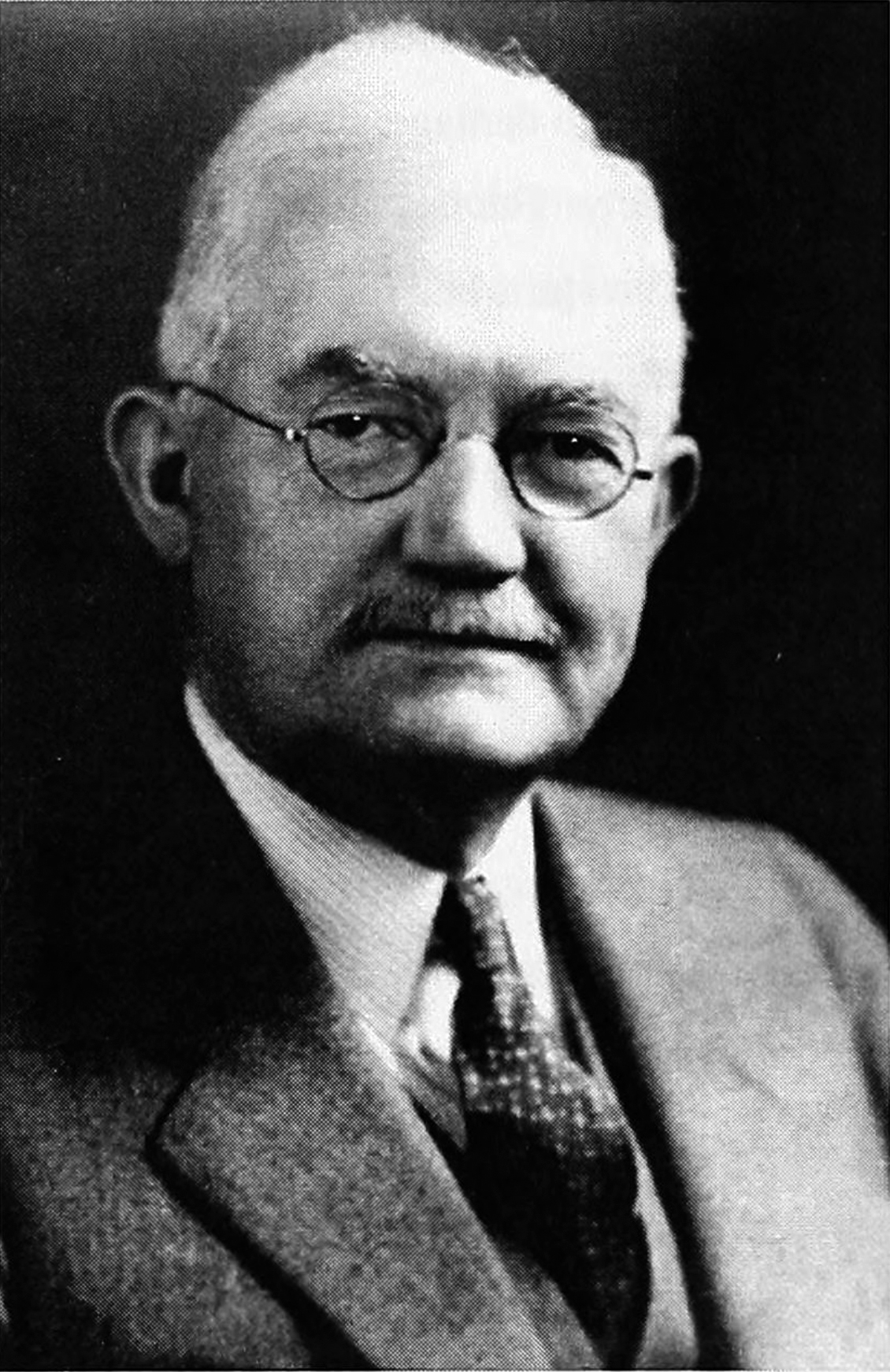
- Frank Mace MacFarland, 1935
- Born: June 10, 1869; Centralia, Illinois
- Died: February 21, 1951 (aged 81); San Francisco, California
- Education: DePauw University
- Spouse: Olive Knowles Hornbrook
- Scientific career
- Fields: Malacology, Natural History
- Workplaces: Stanford University

Frank Mace MacFarland (1869–1951) was an American malacologist associated with Stanford University in California. Born in Centralia, Illinois, MacFarland attended DePauw University (A.B. 1889), Stanford University (A.M., 1893) and the University of Wurzburg (PhD, 1896). On August 27, 1902, MacFarland married Olive Knowles Hornbrook (b.30 June 1872, West Virginia; B.L. 1893, Ohio Wesleyan University; A.B. 1908, Stanford; d. 1 May 1962, San Mateo, California). Mrs. MacFarland was a skilled technician and artist whose delicate watercolor paintings illustrated many of his scientific publications.

Frank MacFarland was an authority on the life and habits of nudibranchs and he left unfinished a comprehensive monograph on the group which was published posthumously in 1966. He played a leading role in organizing the Hopkins Seaside Laboratory (now Hopkins Marine Station) in Pacific Grove, California, of which he was in charge from 1910 to 1913 and co-director from 1915 to 1917, and in which he maintained an active interest throughout the remainder of his life.

MacFarland served as President of the California Academy of Sciences from 1934 to 1946; his research collection of opisthobranch mollusks formed the basis of the academy's invertebrate collection.

In 2006, the MacFarland home on the Stanford campus (designed in 1914 by Arthur Bridgman Clark) was added to the National Register of Historic Places.

== Taxa named in his honor ==
Gastropods named in honor of Frank Mace MacFarland include one genus and four species:

- Macfarlandaea Ev. Marcus & Gosliner, 1984 accepted as Pleurobranchaea Leue, 1813
- Doridopsis macfarlandi Ostergaard, 1955 accepted as Dendrodoris nigra (Stimpson, 1855)
- Felimida macfarlandi (Cockerell, 1901)
- Platydoris macfarlandi Hanna, 1951
- Runcina macfarlandi Gosliner, 1991

== Taxa named by MacFarland ==
- Acanthodoris brunnea MacFarland, 1905
- Acanthodoris hudsoni MacFarland, 1905
- Acanthodoris lutea MacFarland, 1925
- Aegires albopunctatus MacFarland, 1905
- Ancula pacifica MacFarland, 1964 accepted as Ancula gibbosa (Risso, 1818)
- Anteaeolidiella oliviae (MacFarland, 1966)
- Berthella agassizii (MacFarland, 1909)
- Berthella strongi (MacFarland, 1966)
- Cadlina flavomaculata MacFarland, 1905
- Cadlina marginata MacFarland, 1905 accepted as Cadlina luteomarginata McFarland, 1966
- Cadlina modesta MacFarland, 1966
- Corambe pacifica MacFarland & O'Donoghue, 1929
- Corambella bolini MacFarland, 1966 accepted as Corambe steinbergae (Lance, 1962)
- Cuthona abronia (MacFarland, 1966)
- Cuthona albocrusta (MacFarland, 1966)
- Cuthona flavovulta (MacFarland, 1966)
- Cuthona fulgens (MacFarland, 1966)
- Cuthona virens (MacFarland, 1966)
- Dendrodoris fulva (MacFarland, 1905)
- Dendronotus albus MacFarland, 1966
- Dendronotus subramosus MacFarland, 1966
- Dendronotus venustus MacFarland, 1966
- Diaulula greeleyi (MacFarland, 1909)
- Dirona MacFarland, 1905
- Dirona albolineata MacFarland, 1905
- Dirona picta MacFarland, 1905
- Discodoris branneri MacFarland, 1909
- Discodoris voniheringi MacFarland, 1909
- Doris odhneri MacFarland, 1966
- Drepanida MacFarland, 1931 accepted as Trapania Pruvot-Fol, 1931
- Elysia bedeckta MacFarland, 1966 accepted as Elysia hedgpethi Er. Marcus, 1961
- Eubranchus occidentalis MacFarland, 1966
- Flabellina pricei (MacFarland, 1966)
- Flabellinopsis MacFarland, 1966
- Geitodoris heathi (MacFarland, 1905)
- Hancockia californica MacFarland, 1923
- Hancockiidae MacFarland, 1923
- Hermaea oliviae (MacFarland, 1966)
- Hermaea ornata MacFarland, 1966 accepted as Placida dendritica (Alder & Hancock, 1843)
- Hopkinsia MacFarland, 1905 accepted as Okenia Menke, 1830
- Laila MacFarland, 1905 accepted as Limacia O. F. Müller, 1781
- Limacia cockerelli (MacFarland, 1905)
- Montereina MacFarland, 1905
- Montereina nobilis MacFarland, 1905
- Okenia rosacea (MacFarland, 1905)
- Petelodoris spongicola MacFarland, 1966 accepted as Atagema alba (O'Donoghue, 1927)
- Phidiana nigra MacFarland, 1966 accepted as Phidiana hiltoni (O'Donoghue, 1927)
- Pleurobranchaea californica MacFarland, 1966
- Polycera atra MacFarland, 1905
- Rostanga pulchra MacFarland, 1905
- Spurilla braziliana MacFarland, 1909
- Tridachiella MacFarland, 1924 accepted as Elysia Risso, 1818
- Triopha grandis MacFarland, 1905 accepted as Triopha occidentalis (Fewkes, 1889)
- Triopha maculata MacFarland, 1905

== Publications ==
- MacFarland, F. M. 1897. "Celluläre Studien an Mollusken-eiern. I. Zur Befruchtung des Eies von Pleurophyllidia californica (Cooper) Bergh. II. Die Centrosomen bei der Richtungskörperbildung im Ei von Diaulula sandiegensis (Cooper) Bergh." Zoologische Jahrbücher, Abtheilung für Morphologie 10: 227–264, pls. 18–22.
- MacFarland, F. M. 1905. "A preliminary account of the Dorididae of Monterey Bay, California." Proceedings of the Biological Society, Washington 18: 35–54.
- MacFarland, F. M. 1906. "Opisthobranchiate Mollusca from Monterey Bay, California, and vicinity." Bulletin of the Bureau of Fisheries 25: 109-151, pls. 18–31.
- MacFarland, F. M. 1908. "Northern Opisthobranchiata." The Nautilus 22(2): 23–24.
- MacFarland, F. M. 1909. "The opisthobranchiate Mollusca of the Branner-Agassiz expedition to Brazil." Leland Stanford Junior University Publications, University Series (2): 1–104, pls. 1–19.
- MacFarland, F. M. 1912. "The nudibranch family Dironidae." Zoologische Jahrbücher Supplement 15(1): 515–536, pls. 30–32.
- MacFarland, F. M. 1918. "The Dolabellinae." Reports on the scientific results of the expedition to the tropical Pacific by the United States Fish commission steamer Albatross, from August, 1899, to June, 1900. XIX. Published by permission of H.M. Smith, U.S. commissioner of fish and fisheries.
- MacFarland, F. M. 1923. "The morphology of the nudibranch genus Hancockia." Journal of Morphology 38(1): 65–104, pls. 1–6.
- MacFarland, F. M. 1925. "The Acanthodorididae of the California coast." The Nautilus 39(2): 49–65.
- MacFarland, F. M. 1926. "The Acanthodorididae of the California coast." The Nautilus 39(3): 94–103, pls. 2–3.
- MacFarland, F. M. 1929. "Drepania a genus of nudibranchiate mollusks new to California." Proceedings of the California Academy of Sciences 18(15): 485–496, pl. 35.
- MacFarland, F. M. 1931. "Drepanida, new name for Drepania Lafont, preoccupied." The Nautilus 45: 31–32.
- MacFarland, F. M. 1966. "Studies of opisthobranchiate mollusks of the Pacific coast of North America." Memoirs of the California Academy of Sciences 6: 1–546, pls. 1-72.
- MacFarland, F. M. & Charles Henry O'Donoghue. 1929. "A new species of Corambe from the Pacific coast of North America." Proceedings of the California Academy of Sciences, series 4, 18(1): 1-27, pls. 1–3.
