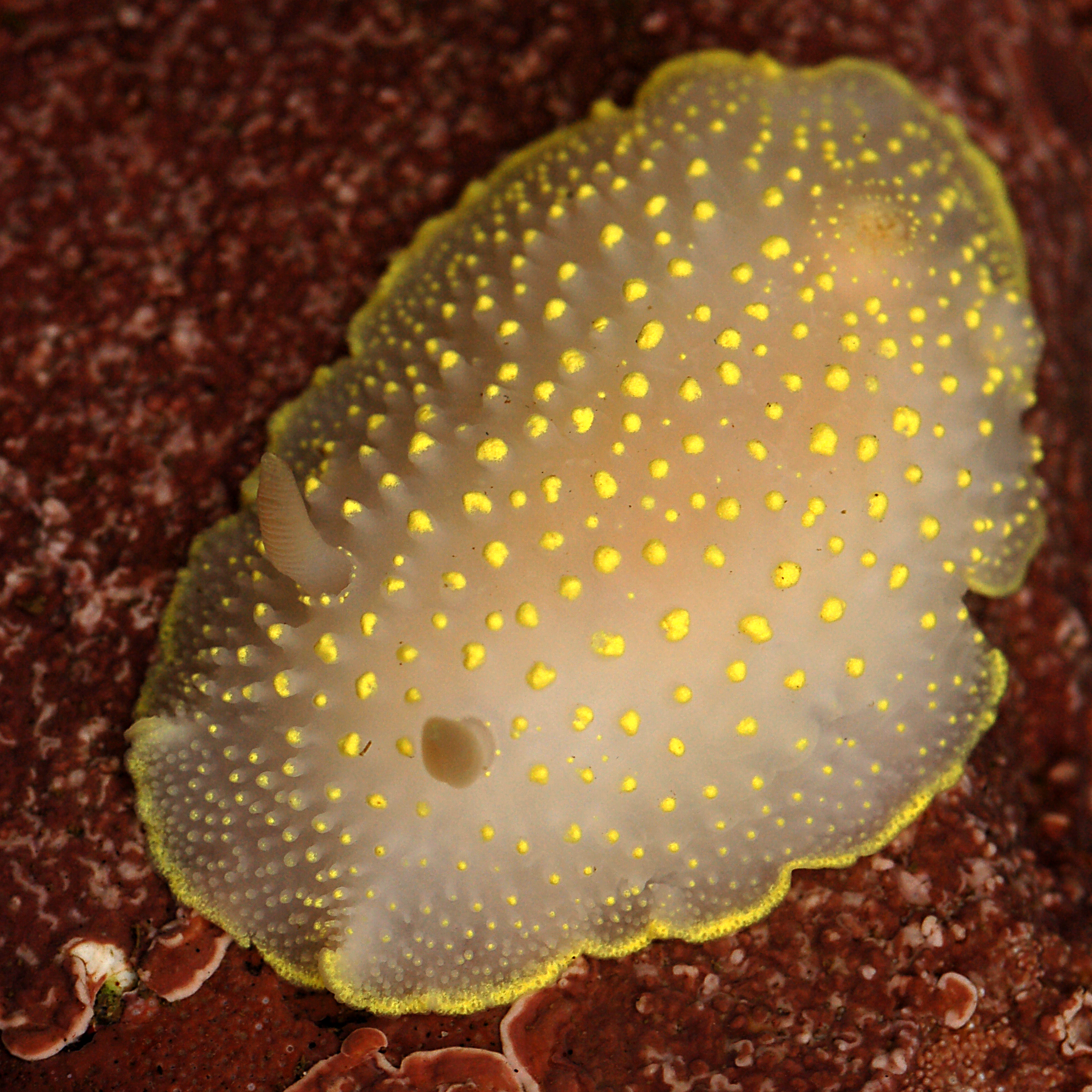

Scientific classification
- Kingdom: Animalia
- Phylum: Mollusca
- Class: Gastropoda
- Order: Nudibranchia
- Family: Cadlinidae
- Genus: Cadlina
- Species: C. luteomarginata

Binomial name
- Cadlina luteomarginata MacFarland, 1966

= Cadlina luteomarginata =

Yellow-edged cadlina

Species of gastropod

Cadlina luteomarginata, common name the yellow-edged cadlina, is a species of colorful sea slug, a dorid nudibranch, a shell-less marine gastropod mollusk in the family Cadlinidae.

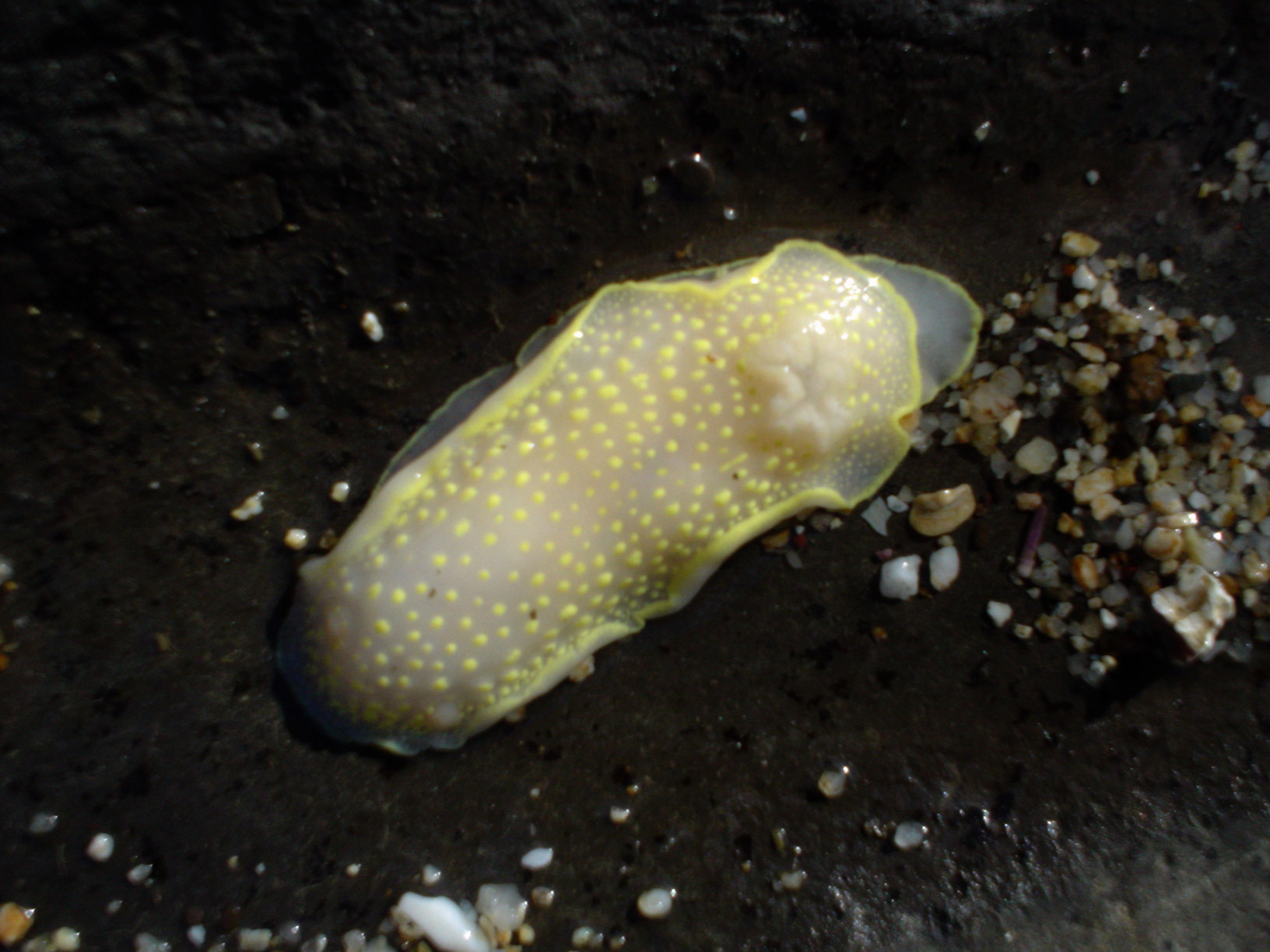
This Cadlina luteomarginata is out of the water on the side of a California tidepool, therefore its rhinophores and gills have collapsed against its body.

== Distribution ==
This dorid nudibranch lives in the eastern Pacific from Alaska to Mexico. Reports of this species from the eastern coast of North America, need to be investigated. Currently, there is no concrete evidence that this species occurs in the Atlantic Ocean.

== Description ==
The yellow-edged cadlina is a white, oval-shaped seaslug with yellow projections on the dorsum and a bright yellow rim to the mantle. It shows near the rear end a ring of six yellow-tipped feathery gills and rhinophores. The antennae are comblike. The radula has strongly hooked lateral teeth. Their subepithelial glands are compound and consist of large vacuoles with bluish stained content. Agglomerations of glandular tissue can be found on the apex of the tubercles.

C. luteomarginata produces the twenty-three carbon terpenoid luteone.

== Life habits ==
This species lives under rocks and in tidepools from the intertidal zone to a depth of about 20 m in the circalittoral zone. It eats several species of spiculate sponges and also sponges from the order Dendroceratida. It is preyed upon by seastars, such as Solaster dawsoni.

== Footnotes ==
- Debelius, H. & Kuiter, R.H. (2007) Nudibranchs of the world. ConchBooks, Frankfurt, 360 pp. ISBN 978-3-939767-06-0 page(s): 212
