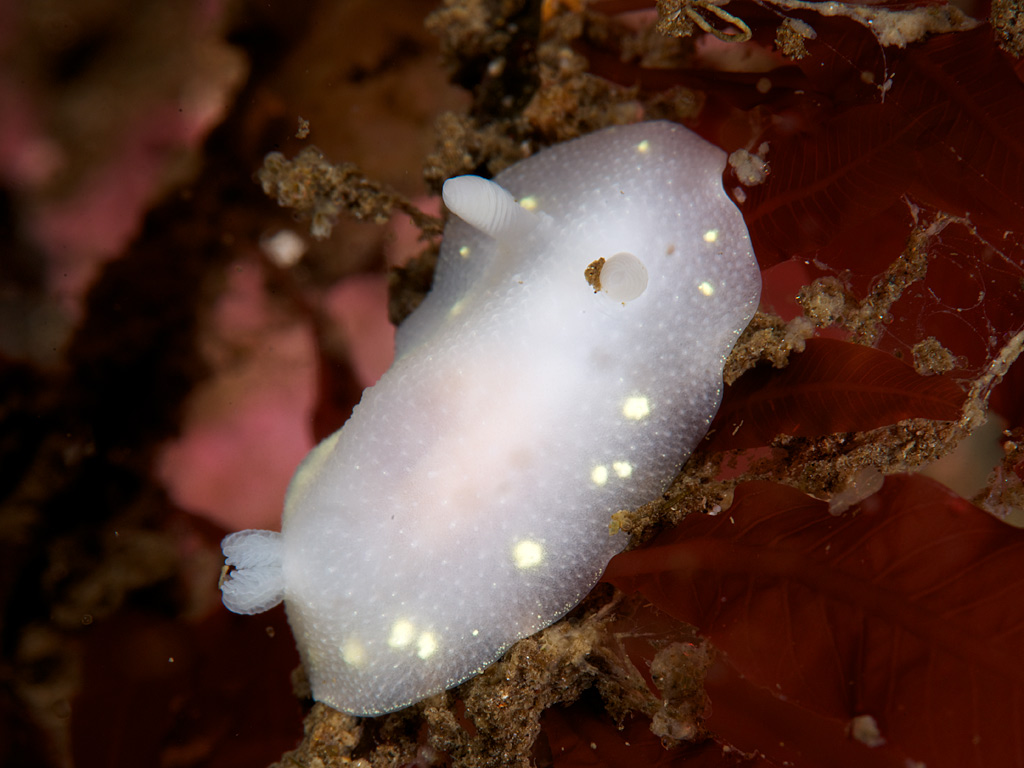
- Fedafjord, Norway.

Scientific classification
- Kingdom: Animalia
- Phylum: Mollusca
- Class: Gastropoda
- Order: Nudibranchia
- Family: Cadlinidae
- Genus: Cadlina
- Species: C. laevis

Binomial name
- Cadlina laevis Linnaeus, 1767

= Cadlina laevis =

Species of gastropod

Cadlina laevis, common name the white Atlantic cadlina, is a species of sea slug, a dorid nudibranch, a shell-less marine gastropod mollusk in the family Cadlinidae.

== Distribution ==
The white Atlantic cadlina is found, dispersed in widely separated populations, on rocky bottoms from the low tide zone to depths of 800 m, ranging from the Arctic to the North Atlantic (Canadian Arctic Archipelago, Spitsbergen, Iceland, Greenland). Along the North American coast its range reaches as far south as Massachusetts. It also occurs along the European coast from Norway to northern Spain. The reporting of a Cadlina with yellow markings near the Portuguese west coast could be an unnamed species of Cadlina.

== Description ==
Cadlina laevis has a flattened, white, semitransparent, oval mantle. There appear to be two color varieties: one showing bright yellow spots near the thin, yellow margin on the back, the other is milky white and lacks spots. There is also an intermediate form with milky yellow spots. These forms do not seem to occur together: the yellow-spotted form lives in deeper water, whereas the other form lives intertidally.

The short, cephalic tentacles are comblike, and the short, tripinnate gills at the back are cryptobranchiate, i.e. they can retract at the same time in a common branchial pit.

The observed length of these sea slugs varies between 25 mm and 32 mm.

The maximum recorded length is 17 mm.

== Ecology ==
Minimum recorded depth is 0 m. Maximum recorded depth is 250 m.

This nudibranch preys on encrusting slime sponges, such as Halisarca dujardini or, in deeper waters, the sponge Dysidea fragilis. They are reported to breed at the end of winter. The penis of the male is encrusted with tiny chitinous hooks. They reproduce by direct development. When the eggs hatch after ca. fifty days, they give small slugs, forgoing the planktonic larval stage. The veliger phase occurs within the eggs.
