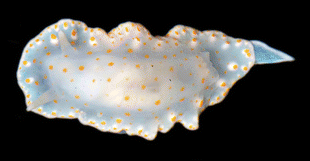
- Tyrinna evelinae

Scientific classification
- Kingdom: Animalia
- Phylum: Mollusca
- Class: Gastropoda
- Order: Nudibranchia
- Family: Chromodorididae
- Genus: Tyrinna; Bergh, 1898

= Tyrinna =

Genus of gastropods

Tyrinna is a genus of sea slugs, dorid nudibranchs, shell-less marine gastropod mollusks in the family Chromodorididae.

== Species ==
Species in the genus Tyrinna include:

- Tyrinna burnayi (Ortea, 1988)
- Tyrinna delicata Bergh, 1898 - synonym Tyrinna nobilis
- Tyrinna evelinae Marcus, 1958
