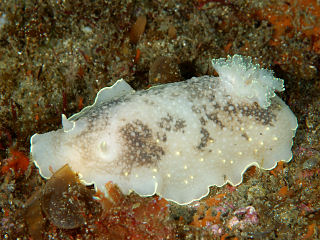

Scientific classification
- Kingdom: Animalia
- Phylum: Mollusca
- Class: Gastropoda
- Order: Nudibranchia
- Family: Cadlinidae
- Genus: Cadlina
- Species: C. japonica

Binomial name
- Cadlina japonica Baba, 1937

= Cadlina japonica =

Species of gastropod

Cadlina japonica is a species of sea slug or dorid nudibranch, a marine gastropod mollusk in the family Cadlinidae.

== Distribution ==
This species was described from Sagami Bay, Japan. It is reported from Korea.

== Description ==
Cadlina japonica is a broad Cadlina with the mantle fluted at the edge and bordered with a fine yellow line. The slightly translucent white mantle is covered with tubercles of two sizes, larger ones separated evenly by smaller. There are small yellow glands embedded in the mantle, clustered behind the rhinophores and towards the edges. Between the tubercles there is a wash of brown pigment. The rhinophores have translucent white shafts, pale brown lamellae and yellow tips. The rhinophore pockets and gills are edged with fine yellow spots.
