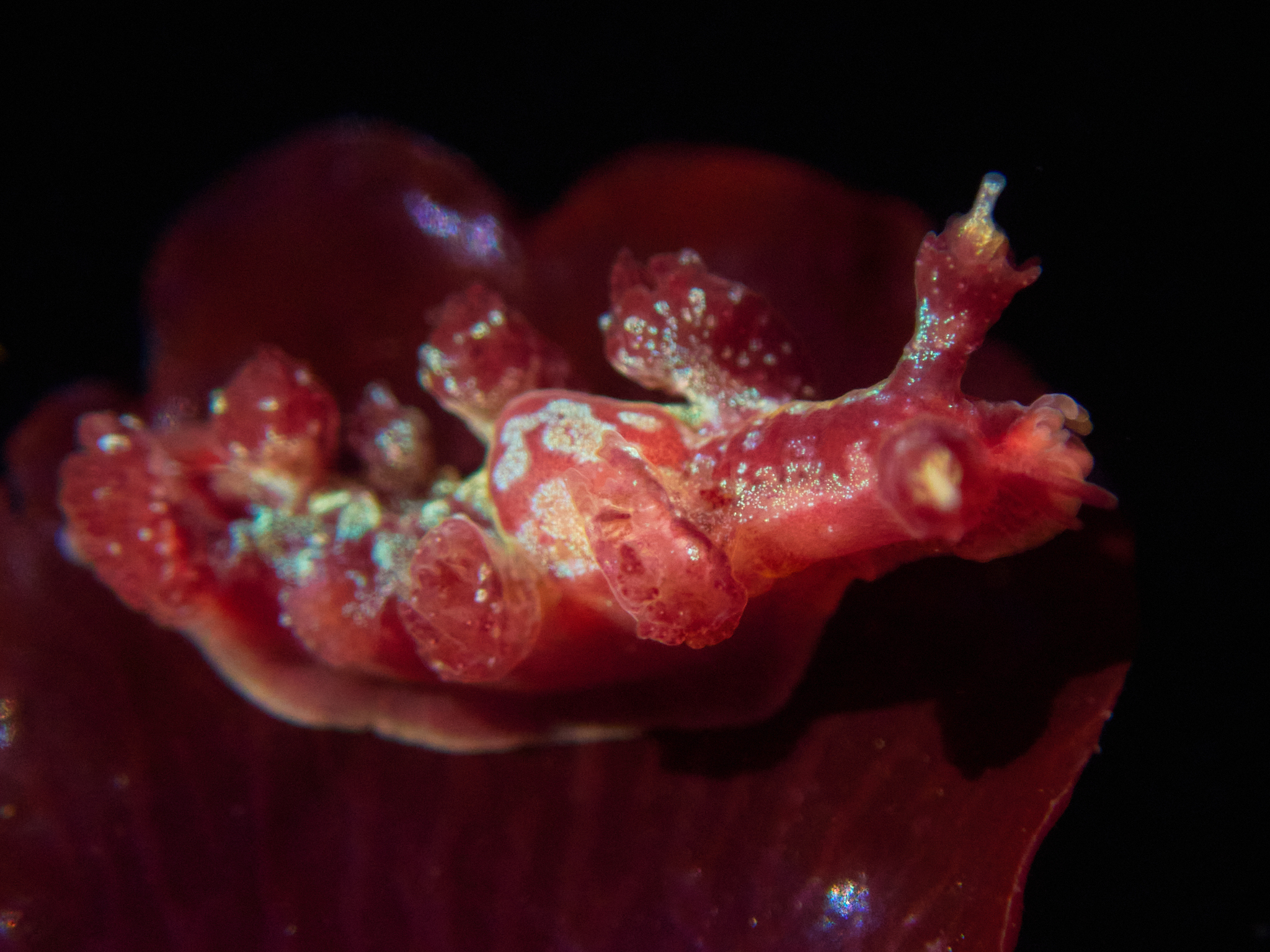
- Hancockia californica
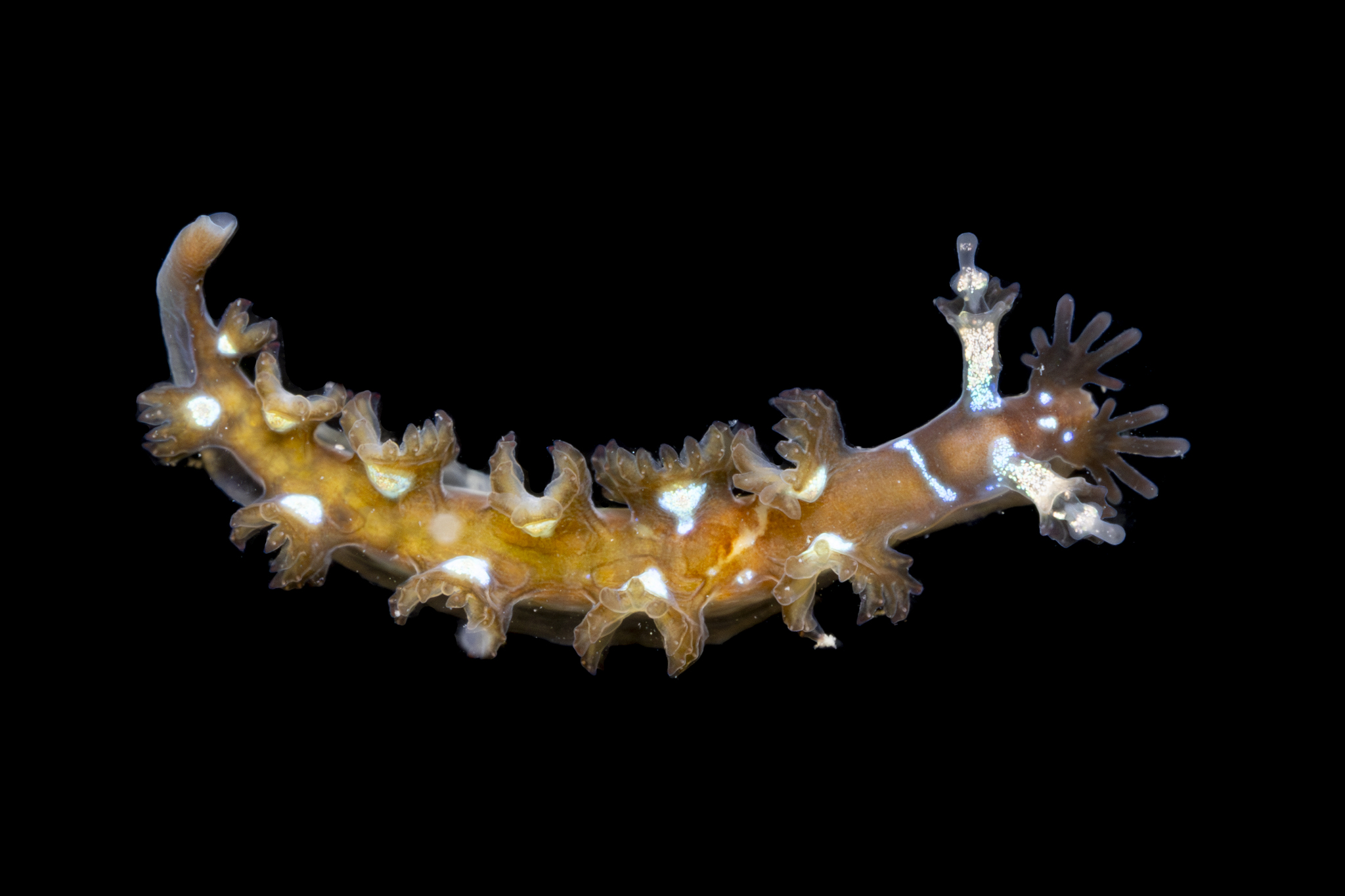
- Hancockia californica

Scientific classification
- Kingdom: Animalia
- Phylum: Mollusca
- Class: Gastropoda
- Order: Nudibranchia
- Suborder: Dendronotacea
- Superfamily: Dendronotoidea
- Family: Hancockiidae; MacFarland, 1923

= Hancockiidae =

Family of gastropods

Hancockiidae is a family of nudibranchs, shell-less marine gastropod molluscs or sea slugs, in the superfamily Dendronotoidea.

== Taxonomy ==
Hancockiidae has been recovered as sister to the assemblage of the families Bornellidae and Dotidae.

== Genera ==
The family Hancockiidae includes only one valid genus:

- Hancockia Gosse, 1877

== See also ==
- Thompson, T. E., & Brown, G.H., 1984. Biology of opisthobranch Molluscs. Vol. 2. Ray Society; London. 1-229, p.20
