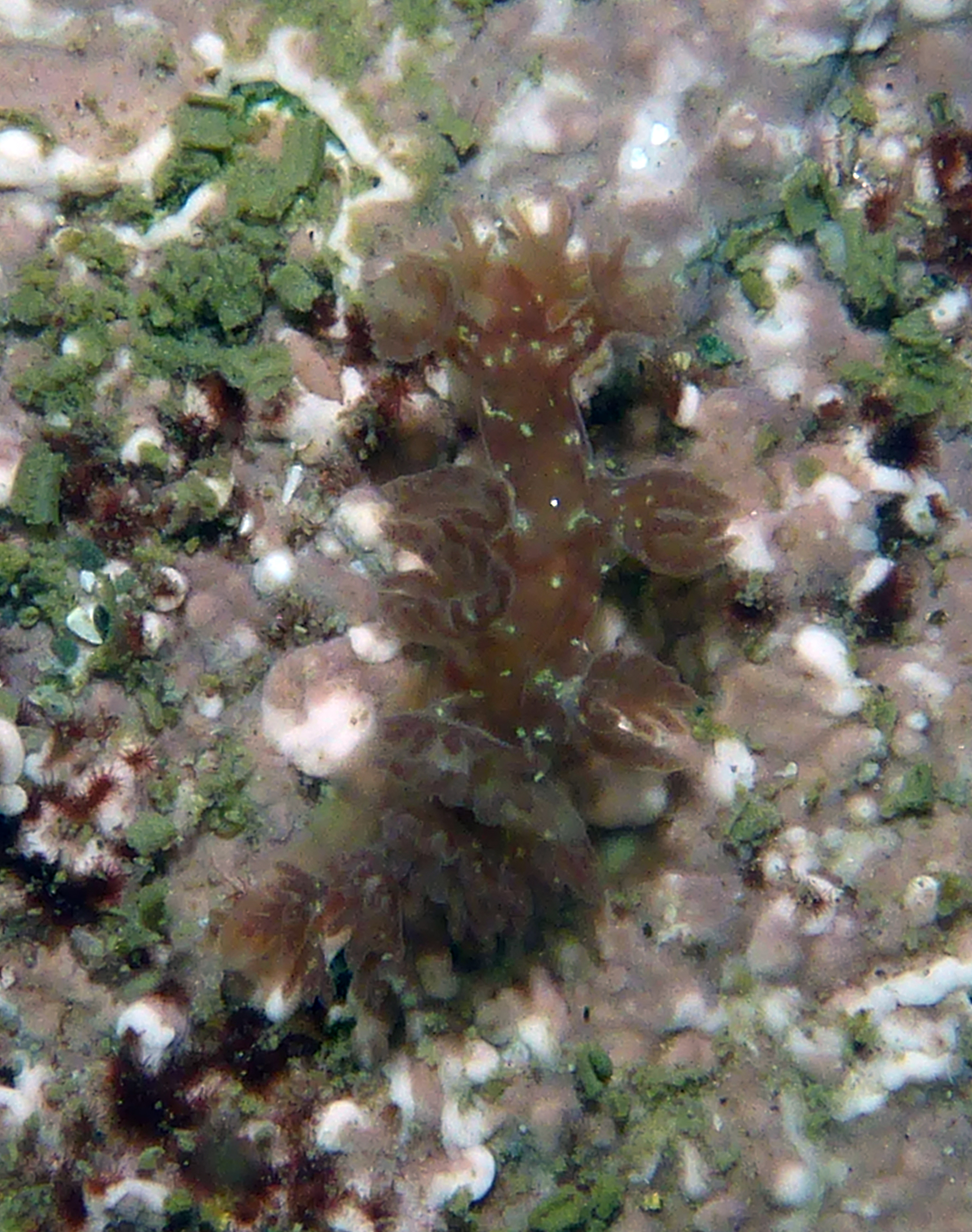
- Hancockia californica from Pillar Point, California

Scientific classification
- Kingdom: Animalia
- Phylum: Mollusca
- Class: Gastropoda
- Order: Nudibranchia
- Suborder: Dendronotacea
- Family: Hancockiidae
- Genus: Hancockia
- Species: H. californica

Binomial name
- Hancockia californica MacFarland, 1923

= Hancockia californica =

Species of gastropod

Hancockia californica is a species of sea slug, an Eastern Pacific Ocean nudibranch, a marine, opisthobranch gastropod mollusc in the family Hancockiidae.

== Distribution ==
This marine species occurs off California, USA., Baja California, Mexico.

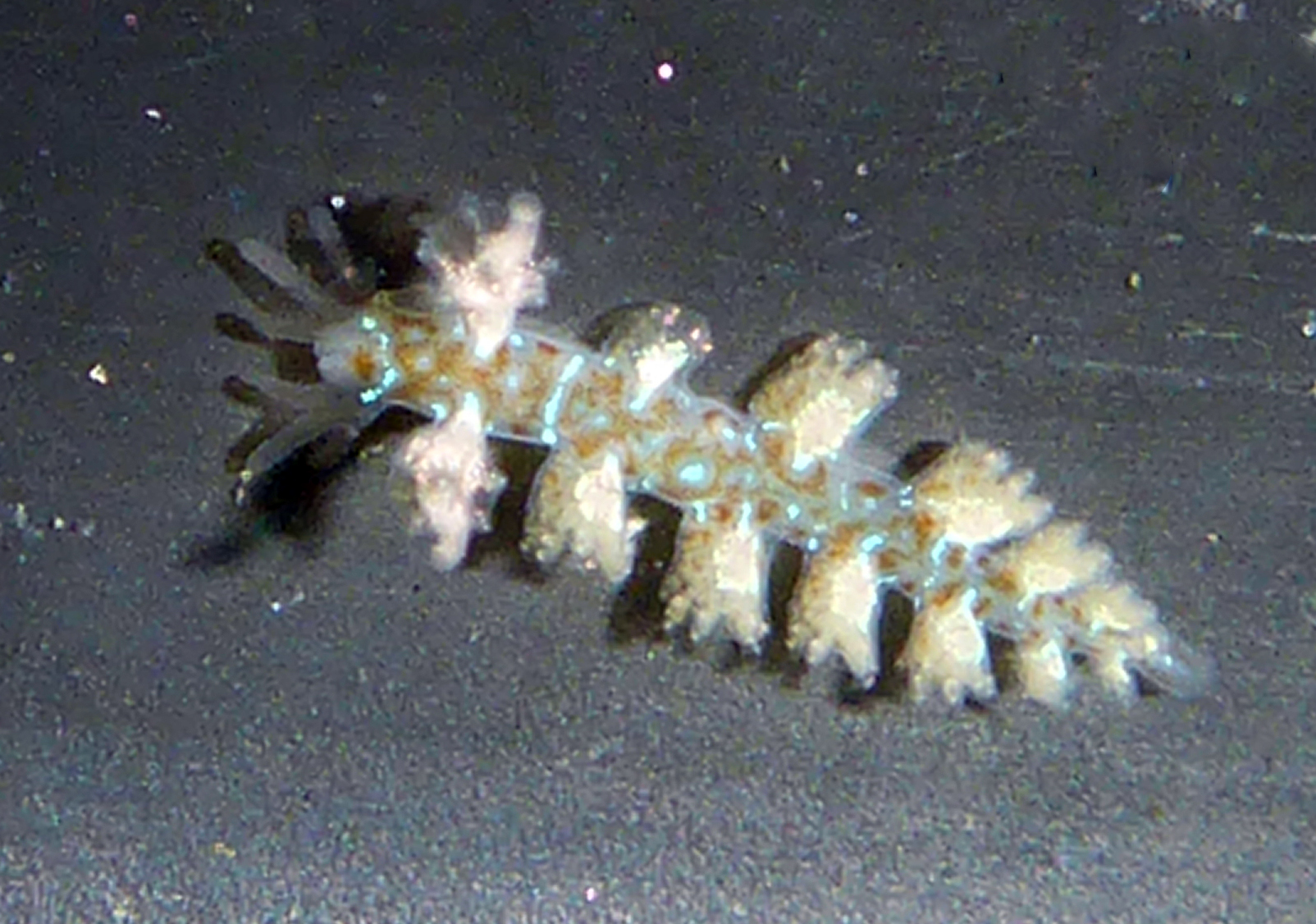
Hancockia californica from Santa Cruz, California
