= Luteone (terpenoid) =

Names
- IUPAC name 8-Methyl-13-methylene-14β-(3-oxobutyl)podocarpan-17-al
- Systematic IUPAC name (4aR,4bS,8R,8aS,10aS)-1,1,8a-Trimethyl-7-methylidene-8-(3-oxobutyl)dodecahydrophenanthrene-4a(2H)-carbaldehyde

Identifiers
CAS Number	80902-35-8
3D model (JSmol)	Interactive image
ChemSpider	10232770
PubChem CID	21601966
CompTox Dashboard (EPA)	DTXSID201030468
- InChI: InChI=1S/C23H36O2/c1-16-7-10-20-22(5,18(16)9-8-17(2)25)14-11-19-21(3,4)12-6-13-23(19,20)15-24/h15,18-20H,1,6-14H2,2-5H3/t18-,19+,20+,22+,23-/m1/s1 Key: KSJHEGGDTGLBND-UZCBEENBSA-N; InChI=1/C23H36O2/c1-16-7-10-20-22(5,18(16)9-8-17(2)25)14-11-19-21(3,4)12-6-13-23(19,20)15-24/h15,18-20H,1,6-14H2,2-5H3/t18-,19+,20+,22+,23-/m1/s1 Key: KSJHEGGDTGLBND-UZCBEENBBA
- SMILES: CC(=O)CC[C@@H]3C(=C)CC[C@H]2[C@@]3(C)CC[C@@H]1[C@]2(C=O)CCCC1(C)C

Properties
Chemical formula	C_{23}H_{36}O_{2}
Molar mass	344.539 g·mol^{−1}
- Except where otherwise noted, data are given for materials in their standard state (at 25 °C [77 °F], 100 kPa). Infobox references

Luteone is a 23 carbon terpenoid from a sea slug, the dorid nudibranch Cadlina luteomarginata.

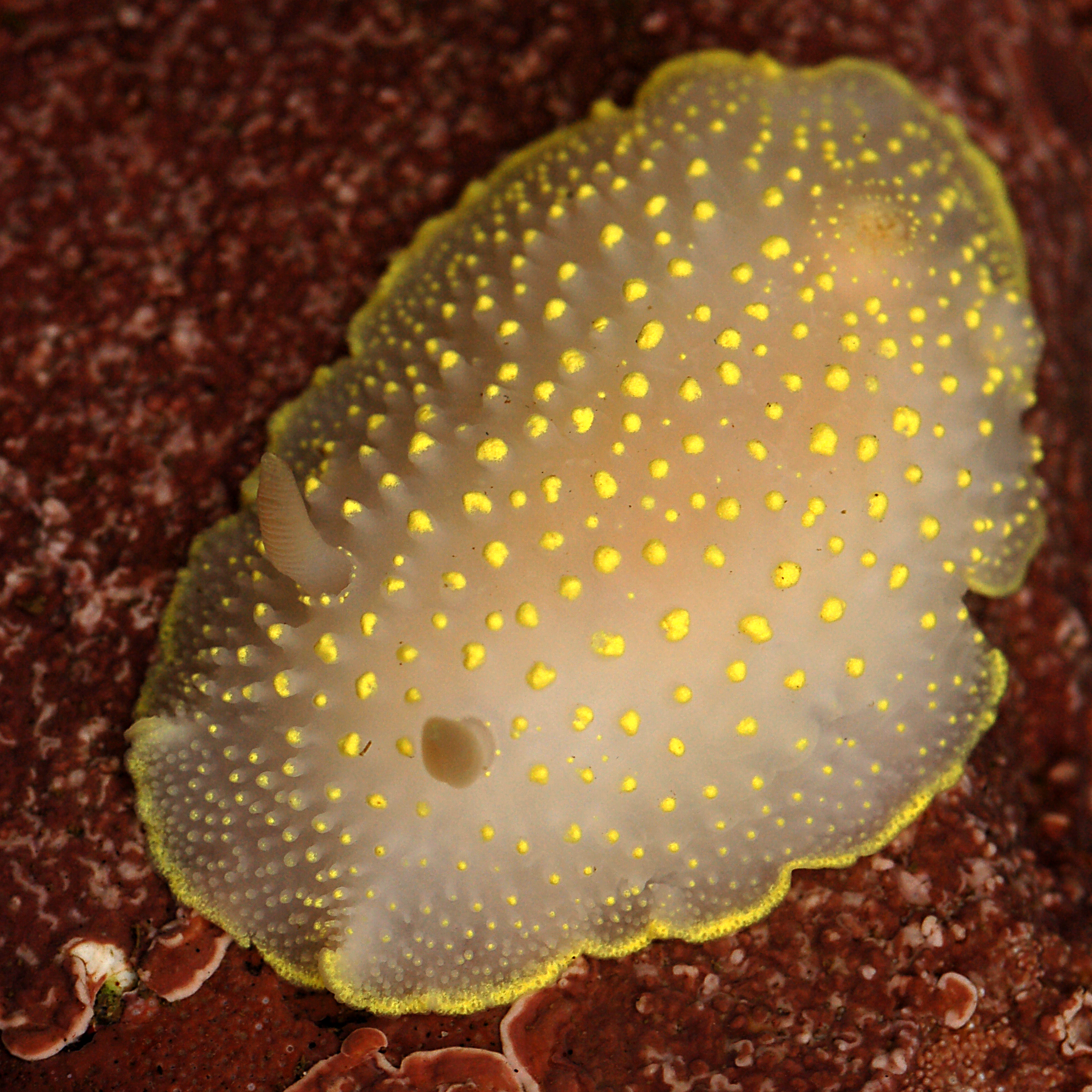
The species of sea slug from which this terpenoid was extracted
