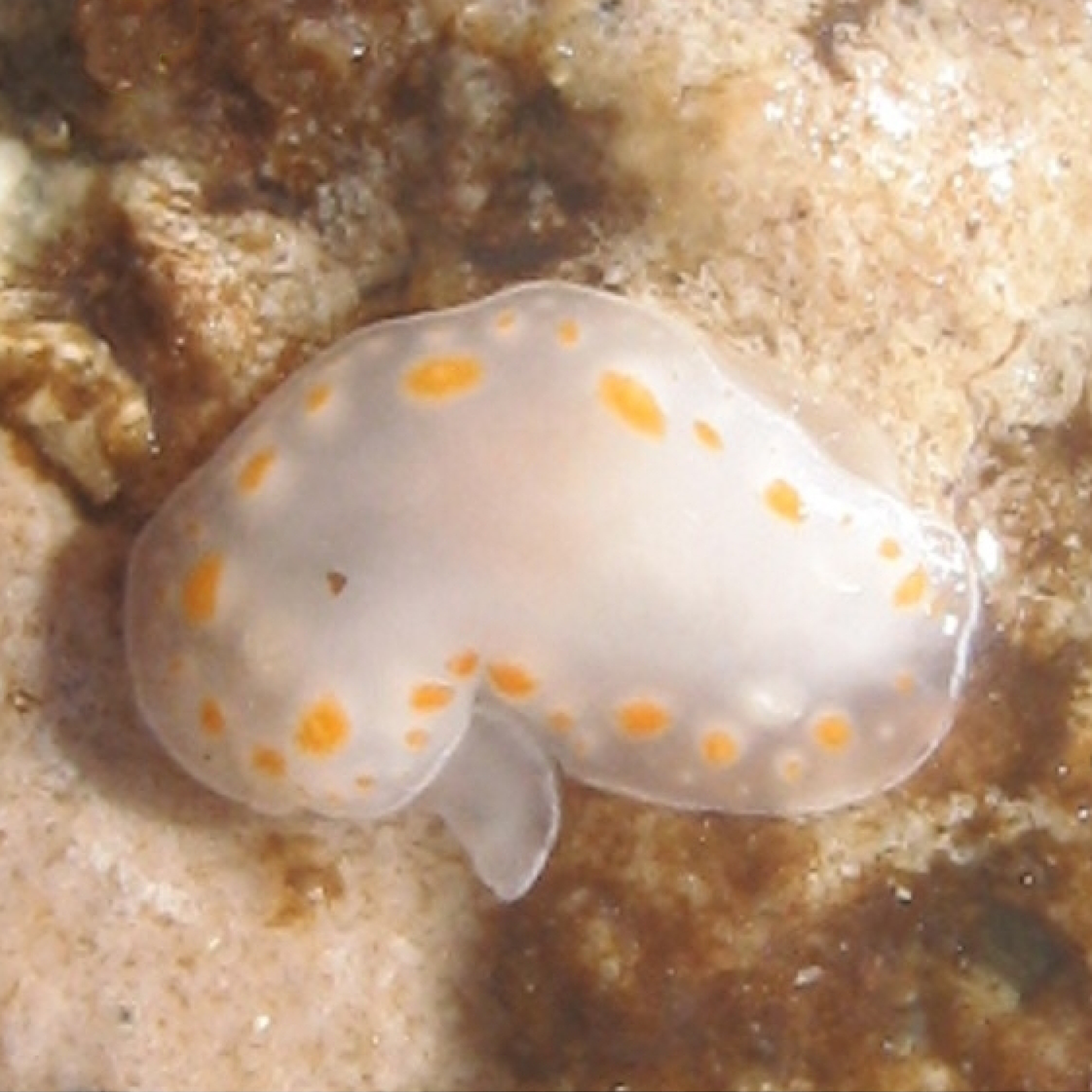

Scientific classification
- Kingdom: Animalia
- Phylum: Mollusca
- Class: Gastropoda
- Order: Nudibranchia
- Family: Chromodorididae
- Genus: Tyrinna
- Species: T. delicata

Binomial name
- Tyrinna delicata (Abraham, 1877)

Synonyms
- Chromodoris juvenca Doris delicata Tyrinna nobilis Tyrinna pusae

= Tyrinna delicata =

Species of gastropod

Tyrinna delicata is a species of sea slug or dorid nudibranch, a marine gastropod mollusk in the family Chromodorididae.

== Description ==
The maximum recorded body length is 68 mm.

== Ecology ==
Minimum recorded depth is 4 m. Maximum recorded depth is 5 m.
