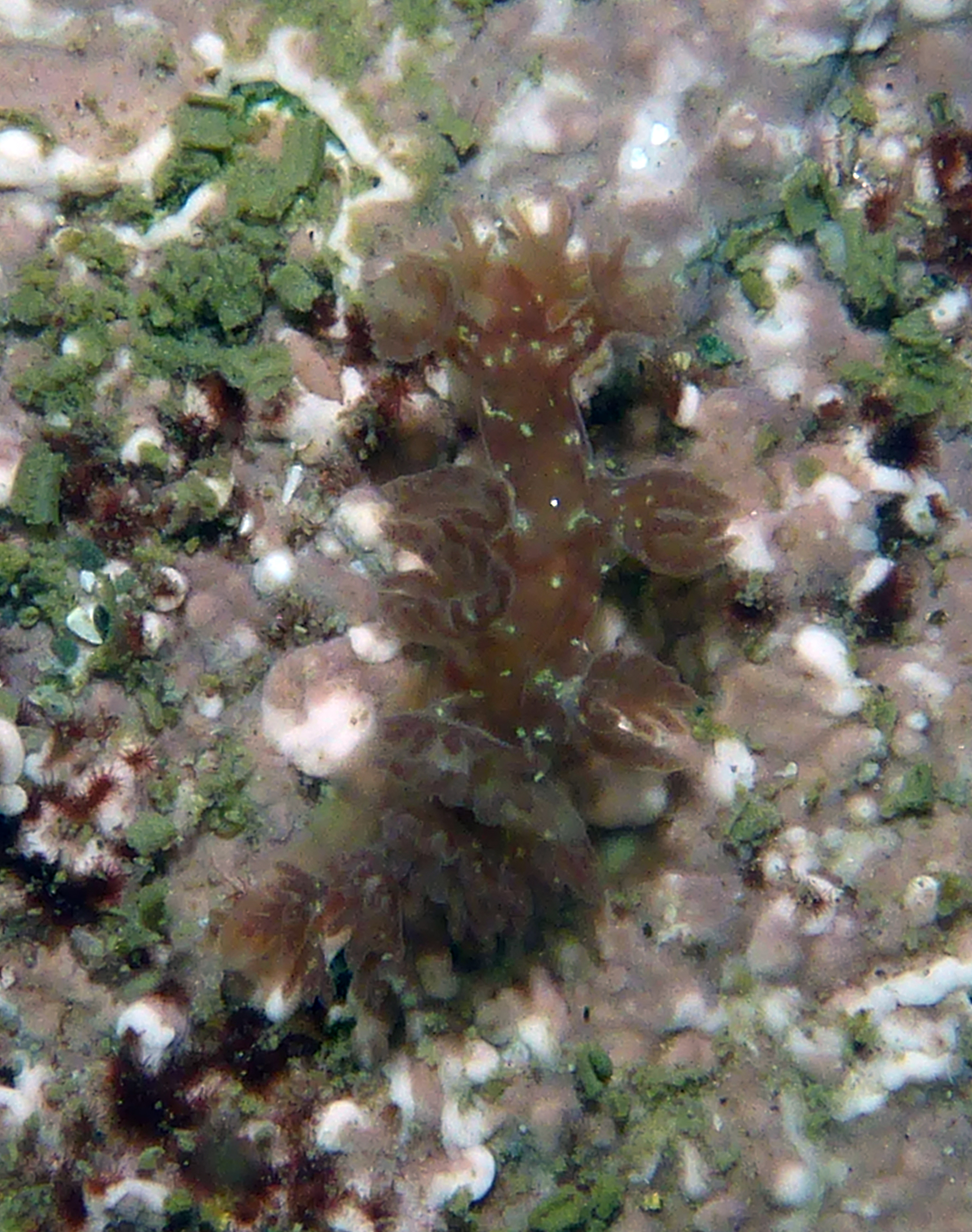
- Hancockia californica

Scientific classification
- Kingdom: Animalia
- Phylum: Mollusca
- Class: Gastropoda
- Order: Nudibranchia
- Suborder: Dendronotacea
- Family: Hancockiidae
- Genus: Hancockia; Gosse, 1877

Synonyms
- Govia Trinchese, 1885; Iduliana O'Donoghue, 1932

= Hancockia (gastropod) =

Genus of gastropods

Hancockia is a genus of nudibranchs, shell-less marine gastropod mollusks or sea slugs, in the family Hancockiidae.

== Species ==
- Hancockia burni Thompson, 1972
- Hancockia californica MacFarland, 1923
- Hancockia papillata (O'Donoghue, 1932)
- Hancockia ryrca Er. Marcus, 1957
- Hancockia schoeferti Schrödl, 1999
- Hancockia uncinata (Hesse, 1872)

Species brought into synonymy

- Hancockia eudactylota Gosse, 1877: synonym of Hancockia uncinata (Hesse, 1872)
