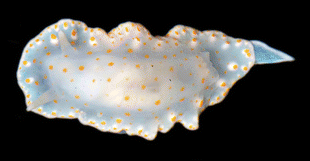
- Dorsal view of Tyrinna evelinae

Scientific classification
- Kingdom: Animalia
- Phylum: Mollusca
- Class: Gastropoda
- Order: Nudibranchia
- Family: Chromodorididae
- Genus: Tyrinna
- Species: T. evelinae

Binomial name
- Tyrinna evelinae (Er. Marcus, 1958)

Synonyms
- Cadlina evelinae Er. Marcus, 1958

= Tyrinna evelinae =

Species of gastropod

Tyrinna evelinae is a species of sea slug or dorid nudibranch, a marine gastropod mollusk in the family Chromodorididae.

== Taxonomy ==
Goodheart et al. (2016) list Cadlina burnayi Ortea, 1988 as a synonym of Tyrinna evelinae, but WoRMS (2016) list it as a separate species.

== Distribution ==
Distribution of Tyrinna evelinae includes Eastern Atlantic, Eastern Pacific, and Western Atlantic: Costa Rica, Venezuela, Jamaica, Puerto Rico, Dominican Republic, Brazil and Panama.

== Description ==
Body is oval to elongate. Background color is usually translucent white with a number of orange spots. Mantle margin is edged by an opaque white line and white mantle glands with orange tips. Rhinophores and branchial leaves are translucent white with opaque white tips. It is up to 30 mm long. Caribbean populations are morphologically indistinguishable from Eastern Pacific and Eastern Atlantic populations.

== Ecology ==
It is found under rocks and on various sponges. Minimum recorded depth is 0 m. Maximum recorded depth is 5 m.

Tyrinna evelinae in Brazil feeds primarily on dysideid sponges Dysidea etheria, but also upon an unidentified chalinid species (family Chalinidae) of the order Haplosclerida. This species has planktotrophic development.
