= Loy thompsoni =

Scientific classification
- Kingdom: Animalia
- Phylum: Mollusca
- Class: Gastropoda
- Order: Nudibranchia
- Family: Corambidae
- Genus: Loy
- Species: L. thompsoni

Binomial name
- Loy thompsoni (Millen & Nybakken, 1991)

Species of gastropod

Loy thompsoni is a species of sea slug, a shell-less marine gastropod mollusk in the family Corambidae.

== Distribution ==
This species is found along the west coast of North America from Alaska to California.
