= Tyrinna burnayi =

Scientific classification
- Kingdom: Animalia
- Phylum: Mollusca
- Class: Gastropoda
- Order: Nudibranchia
- Family: Chromodorididae
- Genus: Tyrinna
- Species: T. burnayi

Binomial name
- Tyrinna burnayi (Ortea, 1988)

Synonyms
- Cadlina burnayi Ortea, 1988

Species of gastropod

Tyrinna burnayi is a species of sea slug or dorid nudibranch, a marine gastropod mollusk in the family Chromodorididae.

== Distribution ==
This species was described from Bahia de Pau Seco, isla de Maio, Cape Verde Islands.

== Description ==
Tyrinna burnayi has a translucent blue body with white viscera shining through. Irregular orange spots are arranged on the mantle, the number of which increases with the size of the animals, as well as many punctiform spots of opaque white or bluish-white. Often the orange spots form circles with a glandular opening in the center. The edge of the mantle is covered in its entirety by a thin orange band, next to which there are internally conspicuous white spots (subepidermal glands) of varying size. The wavy edge of the mantle recalls, by its appearance, species such as Chromodoris purpurea.

The head has two deeply grooved palps and the foot is crossed transversely at its anterior edge and slightly protrudes from its posterior part, its end being pigmented white. The rhinophores have white apices and translucent bases, with 18–20 orange lamellae in the larger specimens. The rhinophore sheath is slightly raised and somewhat pigmented orange with a whitish edge.
