= Loy (gastropod) =

Scientific classification
- Domain: Eukaryota
- Kingdom: Animalia
- Phylum: Mollusca
- Class: Gastropoda
- Order: Nudibranchia
- Superfamily: Onchidoridoidea
- Family: Corambidae
- Genus: Loy; Martynov, 1994

Type species
- Loy meyeni Martynov, 1994

Synonyms
- Proloy Martynov, 1994; Psammodoris Martynov, 1994

Genus of gastropods

Loy is a genus of sea slugs, dorid nudibranchs, marine gastropod mollusks in the family Corambidae within the superfamily Onchidoridoidea.

== Species ==
Species within the genus Loy include:

- Loy meyeni Martynov, 1994
- Loy millenae Martynov, 1994
- Loy thompsoni (Millen & Nybakken, 1991)
