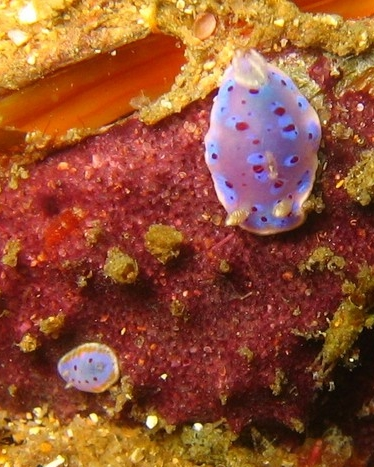
- Two individuals of Goniobranchus thompsoni on a sponge that may be their food species

Scientific classification
- Kingdom: Animalia
- Phylum: Mollusca
- Class: Gastropoda
- Order: Nudibranchia
- Family: Chromodorididae
- Genus: Goniobranchus
- Species: G. thompsoni

Binomial name
- Goniobranchus thompsoni Rudman, 1983

Synonyms
- Chromodoris thompsoni Rudman, 1983

= Goniobranchus thompsoni =

Species of gastropod

Goniobranchus thompsoni is a species of very colourful sea slug, a dorid nudibranch, a marine gastropod mollusc in the family Chromodorididae.

== Distribution ==
This species was described from Providential Hd, Wattamolla Bay, Royal National Park, Sydney. It has only been reported from New South Wales.
