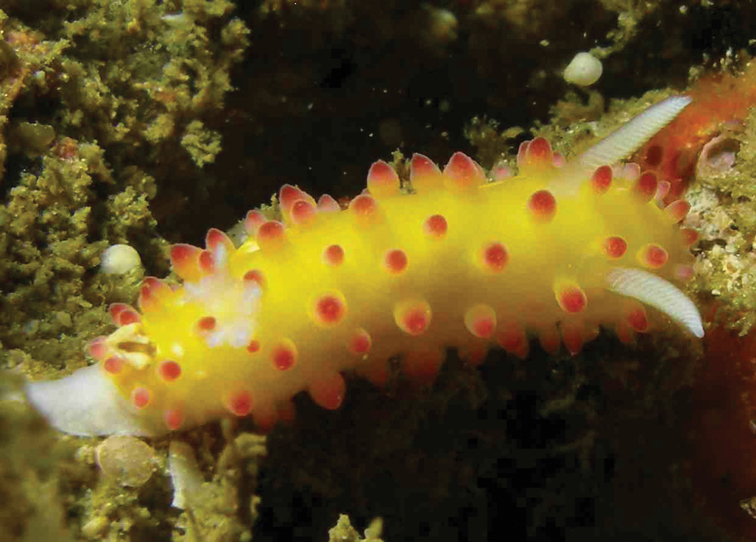
- Cadlinella ornatissima, Sri Lanka

Scientific classification
- Kingdom: Animalia
- Phylum: Mollusca
- Class: Gastropoda
- Order: Nudibranchia
- Family: Chromodorididae
- Genus: Cadlinella
- Species: C. ornatissima

Binomial name
- Cadlinella ornatissima (Risbec 1928)

= Cadlinella ornatissima =

Species of gastropod

Cadlinella ornatissima is a species of sea slug or dorid nudibranch, a marine gastropod mollusk in the family Chromodorididae.

== Distribution ==
This species is widespread in the central Indo-Pacific region and also occurs off Australia (Queensland).
