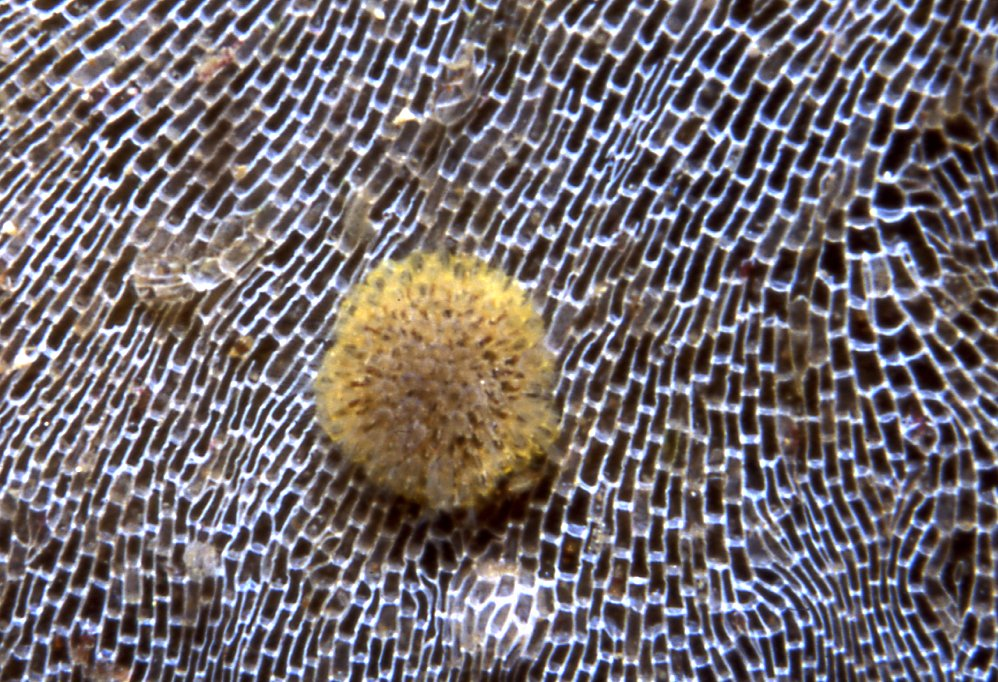
- an undescribed Corambid, the crazed nudibranch, Corambe sp.

Scientific classification
- Kingdom: Animalia
- Phylum: Mollusca
- Class: Gastropoda
- Order: Nudibranchia
- Superfamily: Onchidoridoidea
- Family: Corambidae; Bergh, 1871

Genera
- See text

Synonyms
- Hypobranchiaeidae Fischer, 1883; Loyinae Martynov, 1994

= Corambidae =

Family of gastropods

Corambidae is a family name for sea slugs, dorid nudibranchs, marine gastropod molluscs.

== Genera ==
Genera in the family Corambidae include:

- Corambe Bergh, 1869
- Loy Martynov, 1994
