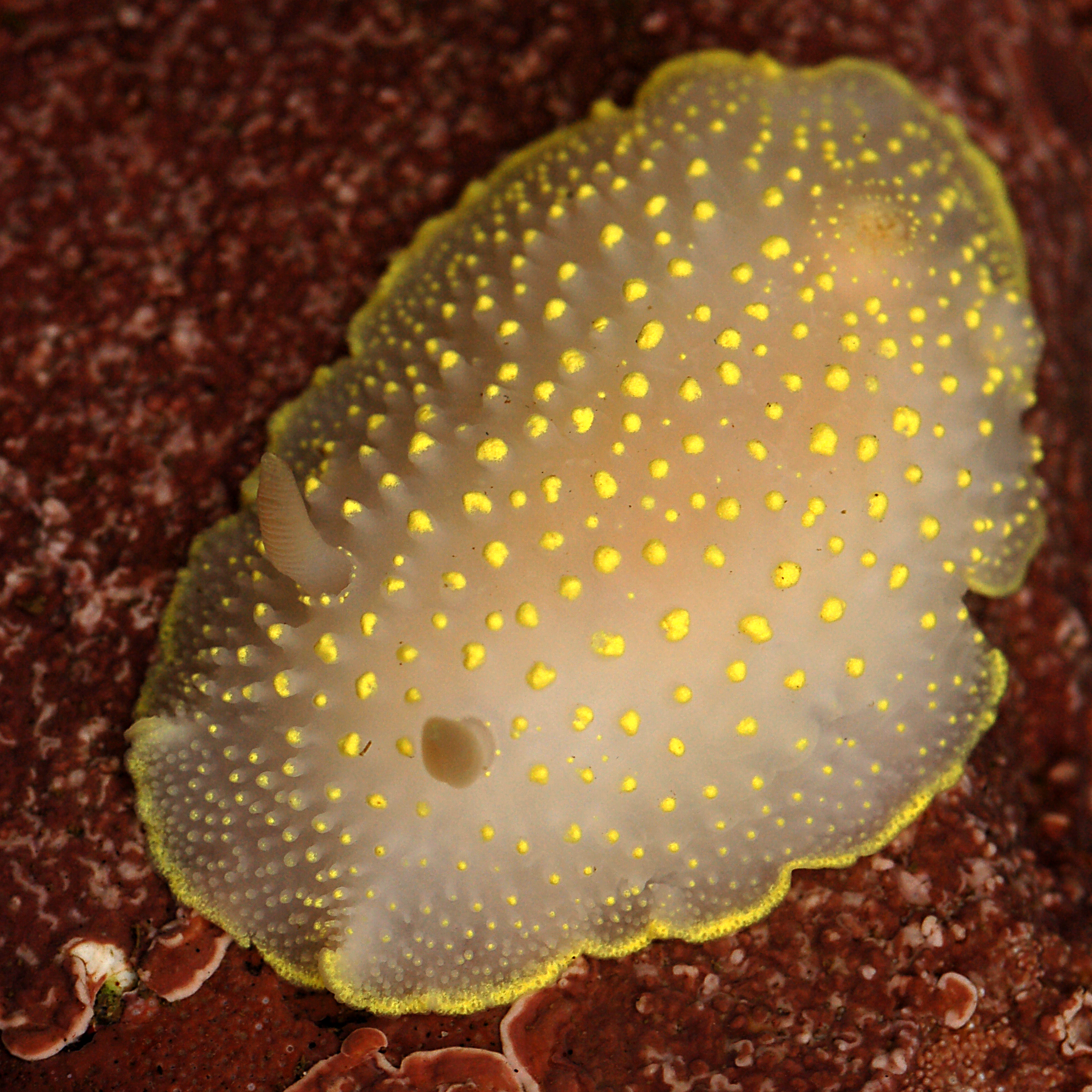
- Yellow-edge cadlina, Cadlina luteomarginata

Scientific classification
- Kingdom: Animalia
- Phylum: Mollusca
- Class: Gastropoda
- Order: Nudibranchia
- Superfamily: Doridoidea
- Family: Cadlinidae; Bergh, 1891

Type genus
- Cadlina Bergh, 1878

Diversity
- 2 genera

Synonyms
- Aldisidae; Echinochilidae; Inudinae

= Cadlinidae =

Family of gastropods

Cadlinidae is a family of sea slugs, dorid nudibranchs, marine gastropod mollusks in the superfamily Doridoidea.

Molecular phylogenetic studies and their taxon-sampling schemes can have a strong influence of the resulting phylogeny. Research by R.F. Johnson in 2011 has shown that Cadlina does not belong to the family Chromodorididae. She has therefore brought back the name Cadlinidae from synonymy with Chromodorididae. She also included the genus Aldisa Bergh, 1878 in the family Cadlinidae.

== Taxonomy ==
Genera within the family Cadlinidae include:

- Aldisa Bergh, 1878
- Cadlina Bergh, 1878 - synonyms: Acanthochila Mörch, 1868; Echinochila Mörch, 1869; Inuda Er. Marcus & Ev. Marcus, 1967; Juanella Odhner, 1921
