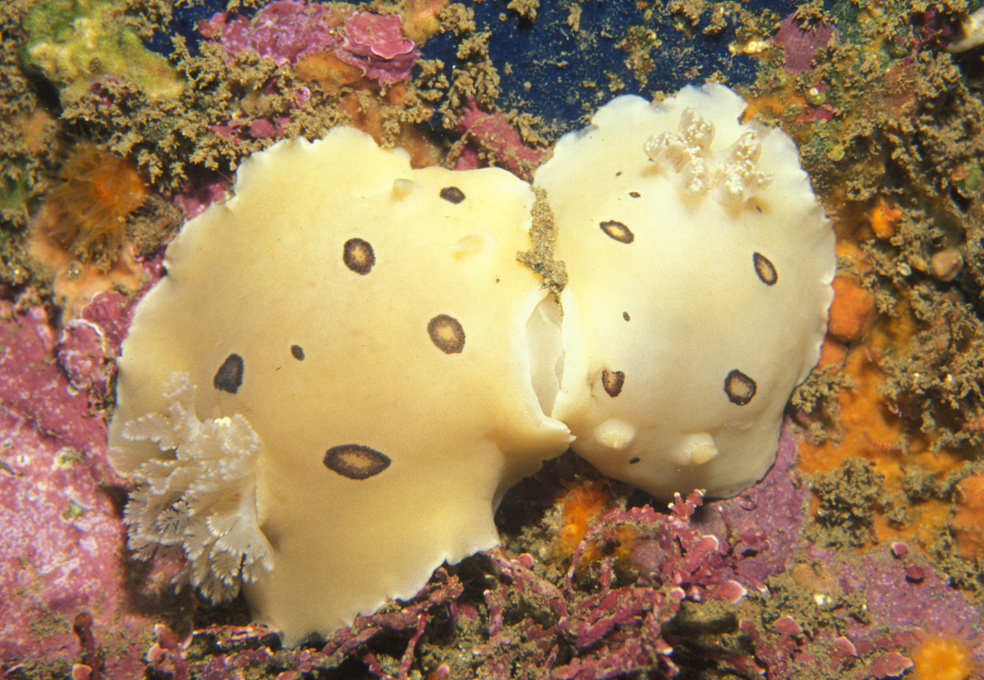
- A pair of Diaulula sandiegensis mating.

Scientific classification
- Kingdom: Animalia
- Phylum: Mollusca
- Class: Gastropoda
- Order: Nudibranchia
- Family: Discodorididae
- Genus: Diaulula; Bergh, 1878

Synonyms
- Anisodoris Bergh, 1898; Ansiodoris [sic] (misspelling)

= Diaulula =

Genus of gastropods

Diaulula is a genus of sea slugs, dorid nudibranchs, shell-less marine gastropod molluscs in the family Discodorididae.

== Species ==
Species in the genus Diaulula include:

- Diaulula alba (K. White, 1952)
- Diaulula aurila (Ev. & Er. Marcus, 1967)
- Diaulula boreopacifica Martynov, Sanamyan & Korshunova, 2015
- Diaulula cerebralis Valdes, 2001
- Diaulula farmersi Valdés, 2004
- Diaulula flindersi (Burn, 1962)
- Diaulula greeleyi (MacFarland, 1909)
- Diaulula hispida (d'Orbigny, 1837)
- Diaulula immaculata Valdes, 2001
- Diaulula lentiginosa (Millen, 1982)
- Diaulula nayarita (Ortea & Llera, 1981)
- Diaulula nivosa Valdés & Bertsch, 2010
- Diaulula odonoghuei Steinberg, 1963
- Diaulula phoca (Ev. Marcus & Er. Marcus, 1967)
- Diaulula punctuolata (d'Orbigny, 1837)
- Diaulula sandiegensis (J. G. Cooper, 1863)
- Diaulula variolata (d'Orbigny, 1837)

Species brought into synonymy

- Diaulula gigantea Bergh, 1905: synonym of Sebadoris nubilosa (Pease, 1871)
- Diaulula hummelincki (Ev. Marcus & Er. Marcus, 1963) : synonym of Discodoris hummelincki (Ev. Marcus & Er. Marcus, 1963) synonym of as Tayuva lilacina (Gould, 1852)
- Diaulula nobilis (MacFarland, 1905): synonym of Montereina nobilis MacFarland, 1905: synonym of Peltodoris nobilis (MacFarland, 1905)
