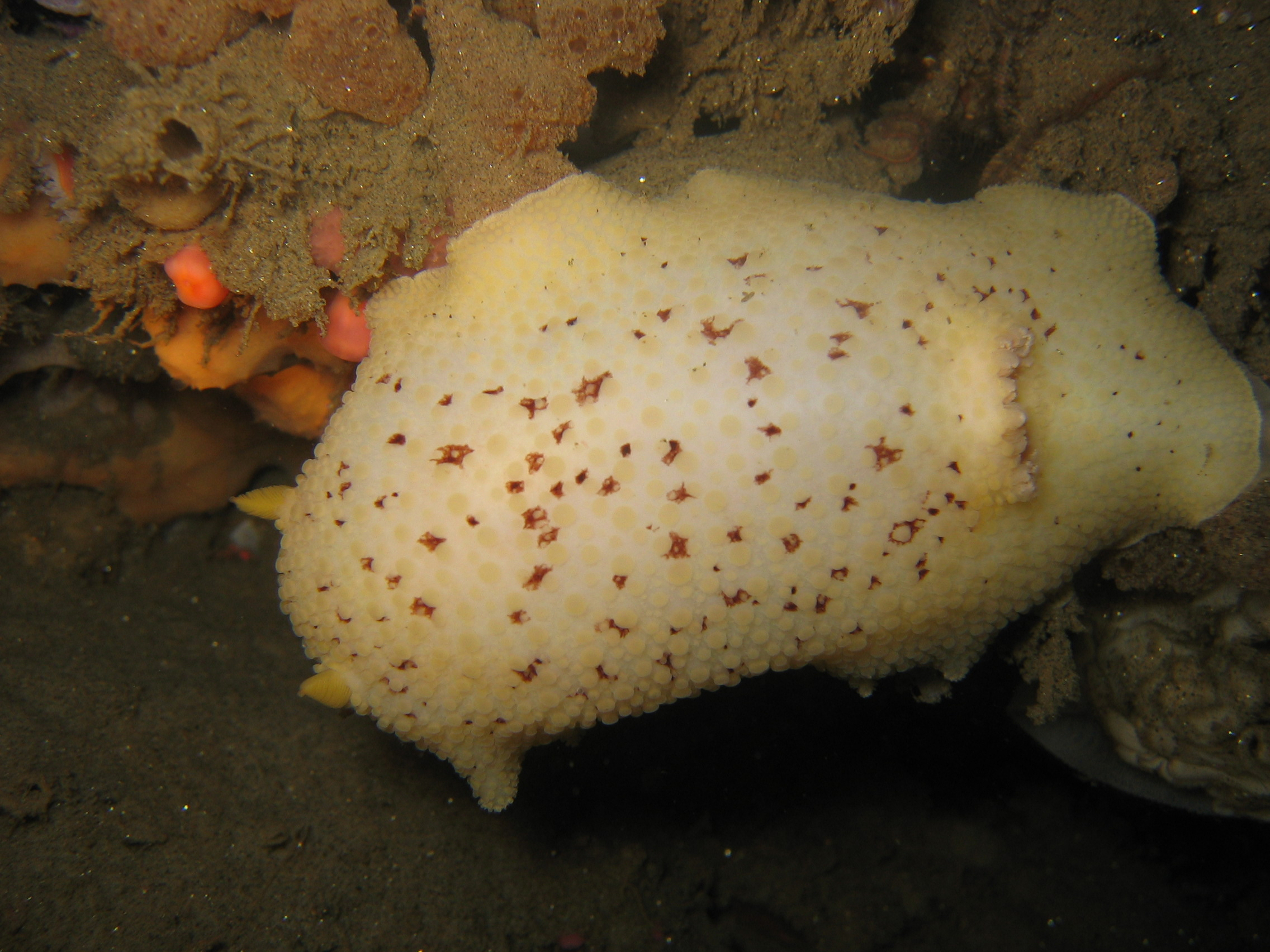
- Peltodoris

Scientific classification
- Kingdom: Animalia
- Phylum: Mollusca
- Class: Gastropoda
- Order: Nudibranchia
- Family: Discodorididae
- Genus: Peltodoris; Bergh, 1880

Type species
- Peltodoris atromaculata Bergh, 1880

Synonyms
- Montereina MacFarland, 1905; Phialodoris Bergh, 1890

= Peltodoris =

Genus of gastropods

Peltodoris is a genus of sea slugs, dorid nudibranchs, shell-less marine gastropod molluscs in the family Discodorididae.

This genus differs from Discodoris by its lack of labial armature. It feeds on sponges, favouring two genera.

And some of these species, such as Peltodoris nobilis, give off a strong lemony scent when rubbed vigorously.

== Species ==
Species in the genus Peltodoris include:

- Peltodoris atromaculata Bergh, 1880
- Peltodoris aurea Eliot, 1903
- Peltodoris carolynae Mulliner & Sphon, 1974
- Peltodoris lancei Millen & Bertsch, 2000
- Peltodoris lentiginosa (Millen, 1982)
- Peltodoris lippa Valdés, 2001
- Peltodoris marmorata Bergh, 1898
- Peltodoris mullineri Millen & Bertsch, 2000
- Peltodoris murrea (Abraham, 1877)
- Peltodoris nobilis MacFarland, 1905
- Peltodoris punctifera (Abraham, 1877)
- Peltodoris rosae Valdés & Bertsch, 2010
- Peltodoris rubra Bergh, 1905
- Peltodoris temarensis Edmunds, 2011

Species brought into synonymy

- Peltodoris crucis (Mörch, 1863) sensu Bergh, 1880: synonym of Tayuva lilacina (Gould, 1852)
- Peltodoris fellowsi Kay & Young, 1969: synonym of Hiatodoris fellowsi (Kay & Young, 1969)
- Peltodoris greeleyi MacFarland, 1909: synonym of Montereina greeleyi (MacFarland, 1909), synonym of Diaulula greeleyi (MacFarland, 1909) (original combination)
- Peltodoris hummelincki Marcus & Marcus, 1963: synonym of Tayuva lilacina (Gould, 1852)
- Peltodoris mauritiana Bergh, 1889 synonym of Peltodoris murrea (Abraham, 1877)
- Peltodoris nayarita Ortea & Llera, 1981: synonym of Montereina greeleyi (MacFarland, 1909), synonym of Diaulula greeleyi (MacFarland, 1909) (original combination)
- Peltodoris sauvagei Rochebrune, 1881: synonym of Discodoris sauvagei (Rochebrune, 1881)
- Peltodoris variolata (d'Orbigny, 1837): synonym of Diaulula variolata (d'Orbigny, 1837)

Nomen dubium

- Peltodoris angulata Eliot, 1903 (nomen dubium)
- Peltodoris noumeae Risbec, 1937 (nomen dubium)
