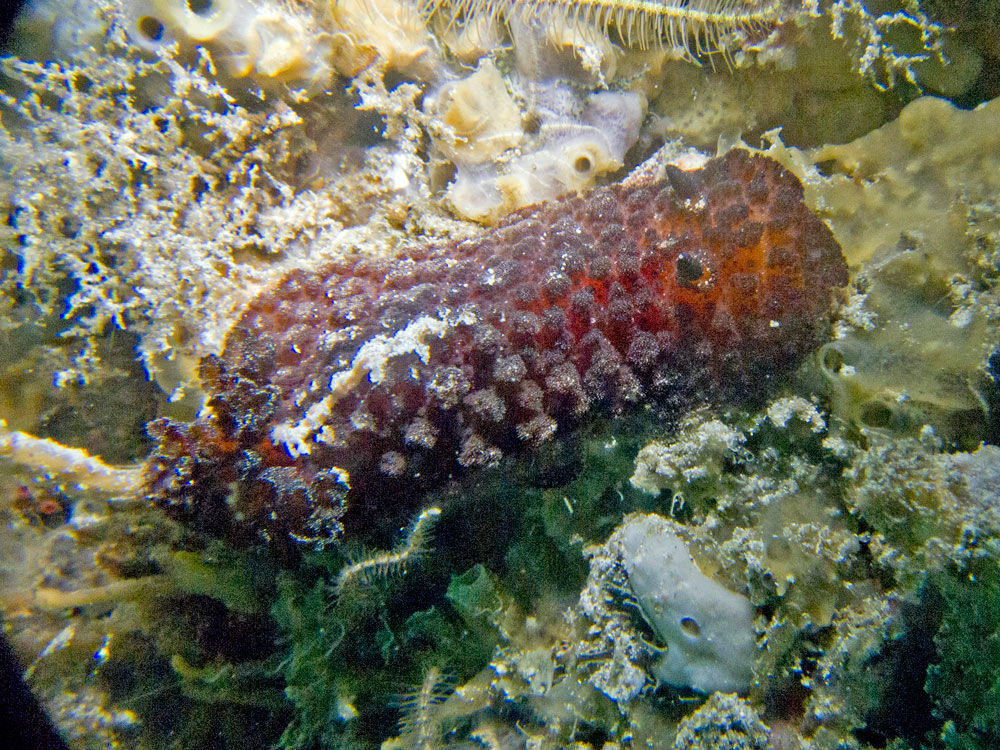

Scientific classification
- Kingdom: Animalia
- Phylum: Mollusca
- Class: Gastropoda
- Order: Nudibranchia
- Family: Discodorididae
- Genus: Atagema
- Species: A. ornata

Binomial name
- Atagema ornata (Ehrenberg, 1831)

Synonyms
- Doris ornata Ehrenberg, 1831; Doriopsis ornata Bergh, 1877; Trippa ornata (Ehrenberg, 1831); Petelodoris triphylla Bergh, 1881 (doubtful)

= Atagema ornata =

Species of gastropod

Atagema ornata is a species of sea slug or dorid nudibranch, a marine gastropod mollusc in the family Discodorididae. It has been considered to be synonymous with Atagema intecta by some authors.

== Description ==
(Original description in Latin) The Doris ornata is an inch and a half long (38.1 mm), oblong in shape, and blunt at both ends. Its back is covered in warts. These warts are slightly larger in the middle of the back and smaller toward the edges; they are all thick, short, and rounded, with their upper surfaces grainy and marked by whitish granules.

The color of the back is black, while the abdomen and foot are a blackish-brown with a reddish-gold shimmer; beneath the mantle, a hint of orange is visible. The abdomen, like the mantle, is rounded at the rear. The upper tentacles (rhinophores) are a fleshy red and appear two-jointed: the lower segment resembles a dorsal wart, while the second is egg-shaped and swollen, sitting upon a short, thinner, whitish stalk. These entire structures can be retracted into openings in the mantle. The egg-shaped portion of the tentacles appears twisted with oblique ridges and grooves.

The labial tentacles are distinct, small, and reddish-gold; they are conical and located next to the two rounded lobes of the foot situated on either side of the mouth. The sexual openings are joined together on the right side, positioned forward beneath the margin of the mantle. The gills are of moderate size, divided into six or seven parts, and deep black in color. Shaped like little trees, they appear to enclose the rear anus with a two-pronged base.

== Distribution ==
This species was described from the Red Sea and is known from the Indian and western Pacific Oceans.

== Ecology ==
This dorid nudibranch feeds on sponges.
