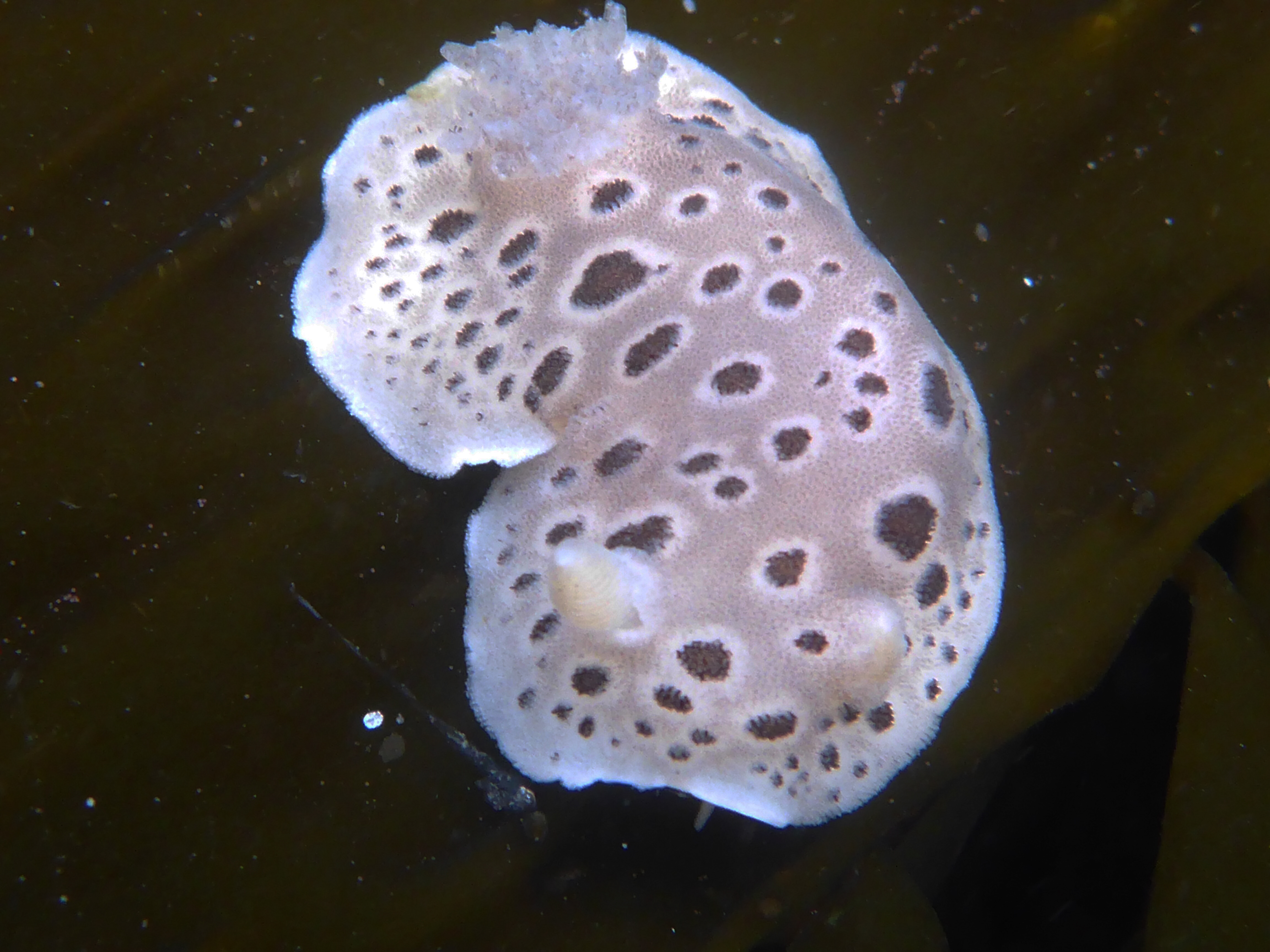

Scientific classification
- Kingdom: Animalia
- Phylum: Mollusca
- Class: Gastropoda
- Order: Nudibranchia
- Family: Discodorididae
- Genus: Diaulula
- Species: D. odonoghuei

Binomial name
- Diaulula odonoghuei (Steinberg, 1963)

Synonyms
- Doris echinata O'Donoghue, 1922; Doridigitata maculata O'Donoghue, 1926; Doris odonoghuei Steinberg, 1963

= Diaulula odonoghuei =

Species of gastropod

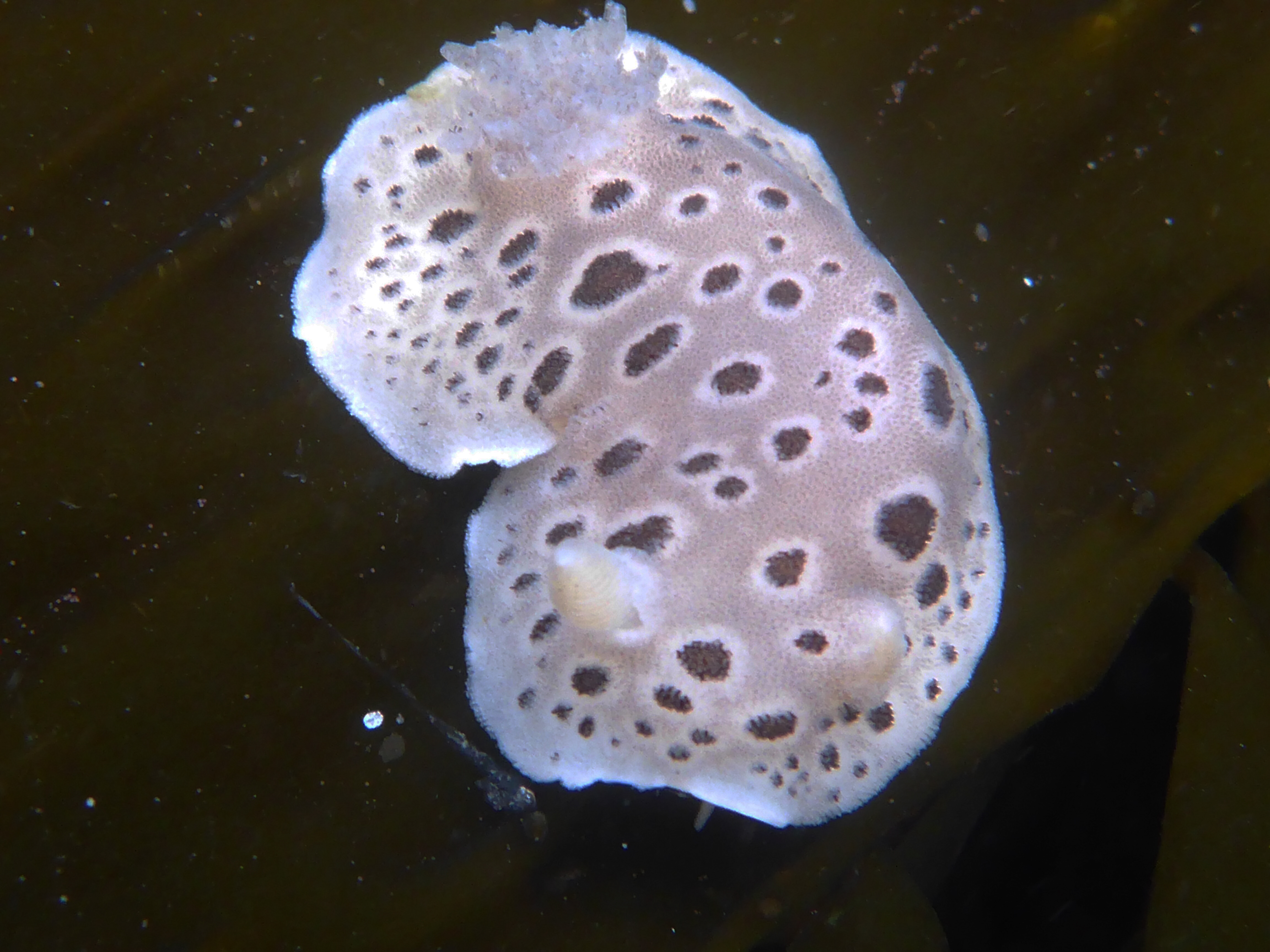
Diaulula odonoghuei from Patrick's Point, CA

Diaulula odonoghuei, the spotted leopard dorid, is a species of dorid nudibranch found in the Pacific Ocean. Identified as a cryptic species in 2016, it is differentiated from its sister species Diaulula sandiegensis by having considerably more spots on their mantle.

== Description ==
This nudibranch grows to about 100 mm (4") in length with many spots covering its mantle, this pattern can extend all the way to the edge of the mantle, a defining characteristic of this cryptic species

== Distribution ==
This dorid nudibranch ranges from the sea of Japan to northern California.

== Life habits ==
This species feeds on sponges.
