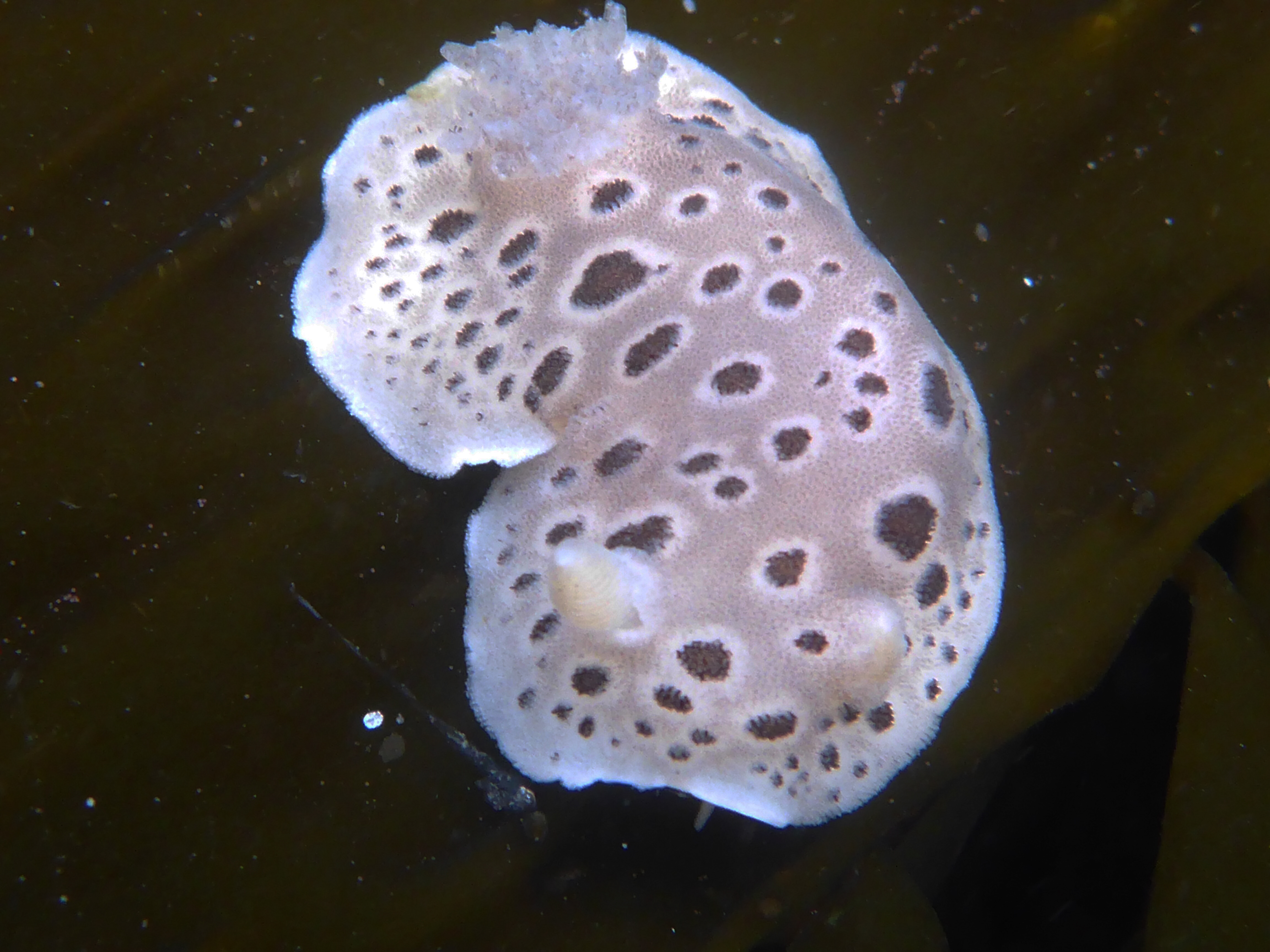
- Diaulula boreopacifica from Patrick's Point, California

Scientific classification
- Kingdom: Animalia
- Phylum: Mollusca
- Class: Gastropoda
- Order: Nudibranchia
- Family: Discodorididae
- Genus: Diaulula
- Species: D. boreopacifica

Binomial name
- Diaulula boreopacifica Martynov, Sanamyan & Korshunova, 2015

Synonyms
- Doris odonoghuei Steinberg, 1963 sensu Lindsay, Kelly, Chichvarkhin, Craig, Kajihara, Mackie & Valdés, 2016.

= Diaulula boreopacifica =

Species of gastropod

Diaulula boreopacifica is a species of sea slug, a dorid nudibranch, a shell-less marine gastropod mollusc in the family Discodorididae.

== Distribution ==
This dorid nudibranch occurs in the northern Pacific, from Northern California to Alaska, Japan and Russia. It has been confused with Diaulula sandiegensis which has a more southerly range from California south to Baja California, Mexico.

== Description ==
This nudibranch has a background colour which can be white or any shade of yellow to a yellowish brown with characteristic markings consisting of many brown spots of varying sizes. These spots are surrounded by a paler ring and extend into the outer part of the mantle. It grows to about 70 mm (3") in length.

== Life habits ==
This species feeds on the sponge Haliclona. It is most common in the intertidal region.
