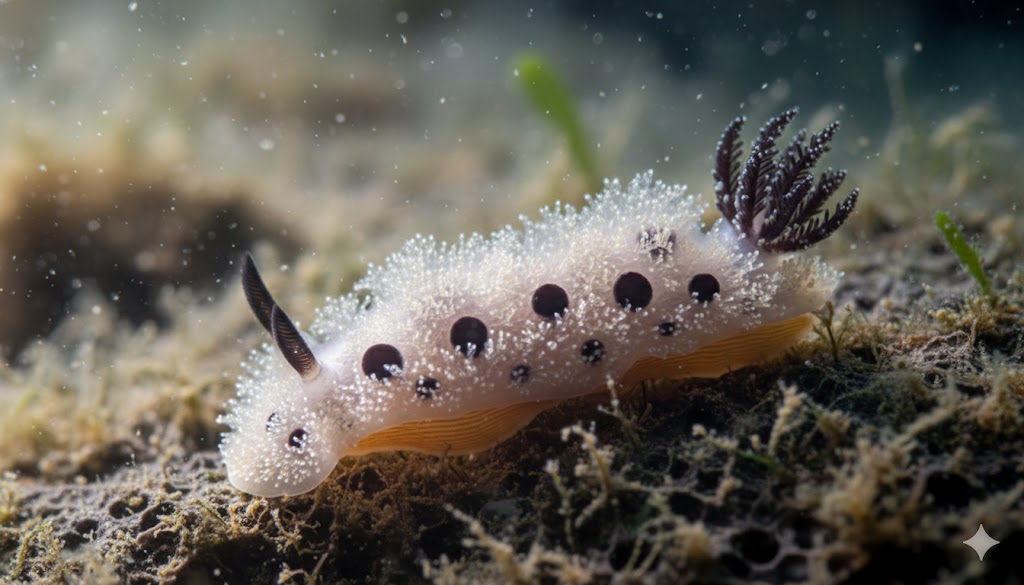
- Live specimen of Atagema kimberlyae

Scientific classification
- Kingdom: Animalia
- Phylum: Mollusca
- Class: Gastropoda
- Order: Nudibranchia
- Family: Discodorididae
- Genus: Atagema
- Species: A. kimberlyae

Binomial name
- Atagema kimberlyae Innabi, Stout & Á. Valdés, 2023

= Atagema kimberlyae =

Species of gastropod

Atagema kimberlyae is a species of sea slug or dorid nudibranch, a marine gastropod mollusk in the family Discodorididae.

== Description ==
The length of the species attains 20 mm.

(Original description) The body is oval and flattened, with a dorsal surface covered in small, irregular tubercles and short ridges that gradually diminish in size as they approach the mantle margin. A smooth, longitudinal central area, notably devoid of any ridges or tubercles, spans the distance between the rhinophores and the gills. Flanking this central ridge are series of depressions that likewise decrease in size toward the mantle edge. With the exception of these depressions, the entire dorsal surface is densely carpeted with caryophyllidia (specialized, microscopic sensory organs located on the dorsal surface of the mantle)

The branchial sheath is defined by three large, distinct lobes, while the gill itself is composed of five tripinnate leaves that spread horizontally in living specimens. The rhinophoral sheaths are elevated, housing long, lamellated rhinophores, each featuring twenty individual lamellae. The body is characterized by an opaque grayish-brown hue, overlaid with pale brown pigment on the crests of the tubercles and ridges, alongside a scattering of opaque white specks. The contrasting depressions are a deep dark brown to black. Both the rhinophores and the branchial leaves have the same color with the rest of the dorsum.

== Distribution ==
This marine species occurs off New Caledonia. it was found on a patch of sponges at a depth of 5 m.
