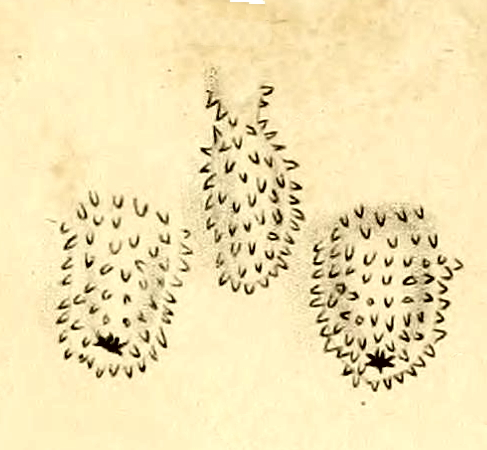
- Atagema triphylla (original drawing)

Scientific classification
- Kingdom: Animalia
- Phylum: Mollusca
- Class: Gastropoda
- Order: Nudibranchia
- Family: Discodorididae
- Genus: Atagema
- Species: A. triphylla

Binomial name
- Atagema triphylla (Bergh, 1882)

Synonyms
- Petelodoris triphylla Bergh, 1882

= Atagema triphylla =

Species of gastropod

Atagema triphylla is a species of sea slug or dorid nudibranch, a marine gastropod mollusc in the family Discodorididae.

== Description ==
(Original description) The base color is a fading white, while the dorsal tubercles are shaded with a brownish hue.

Only a single individual of this animal form was found, collected by Dr. Körbl in 1877 near Enoshima. According to Körbl’s notes, the living animal was "dirty white with brownish warts." The specimen, which was well-preserved in alcohol, measured approximately 14 mm in length, with a body width of up to 8 mm and a height of 5 mm. The rhinophores reached a height of nearly 2 mm, as did the gills. The mantle margin measured approximately 1.6 mm in width, while the foot reached a width of about 3.5 mm. The overall color is a consistent yellowish-white, though the dorsal nodules are dotted with brown; the rhinophores and the gills share the general body color.

The form of the somewhat stiff body is oblong-ovate and slightly depressed. The back is weakly keeled along the midline and is covered throughout with rounded and oval nodules, measuring up to 0.6 mm in diameter. These nodules are topped with low, stiff, truncated tips. Along the midline, these nodules merge into a longitudinal crest that begins between the rhinophores and continues to the branchial region. Toward the mantle margin, which gradually thins toward the edge, the nodules become progressively lower, until the tips stand directly upon the dorsal surface at the very margin. Between the nodules, a more or less distinct, coarse, whitish network of spicules is visible.

On each side of the front end of the dorsal crest sits a robust rhinophore hill, reaching a height of about 1.25 mm. These are two to three times as high and slightly wider than the largest dorsal nodules; they are surrounded by several lobes at their slit-like upper openings. The rhinophores themselves have relatively short stalks; the sturdy club is equipped with 15 to 20 thick leaves and a short tip.

Branchial and ventral features :

At the hindmost part of the back lies the small, transversely oval branchial opening. This is almost completely covered by three robust protective leaves—up to 2.75 mm high—originating from the anterior margin. The upper sides of these leaves are provided with the usual tips, while the lower sides remain smooth; the median leaf is larger than the lateral ones. The posterior margin of the branchial slit protrudes and is covered with tips. The gill itself is formed of three tripinnate plumes, with the lateral plumes possessing a large branch at the posterior base. The anal papilla is low and conical, with the renal pore located anteriorly and to its right.

The underside of the mantle margin is smooth. The sides of the body are of moderate height in the middle of their length, and the genital papilla features a constricted opening. The head is small with a vertical mouth slit, and the tentacles consist of short, triangular, slightly pointed, and flattened lobes. The foot is rounded at the front with a distinct marginal groove; it does not protrude significantly from the sides of the body, and the tail is relatively short.

Internal anatomy and nervous system:

The viscera are not visible through the skin. The strongly flattened central nervous system features kidney-shaped cerebro-visceral ganglia, with the posterior section being slightly larger than the anterior. The pedal ganglia are rounded in outline and are as large as, or slightly larger than, the visceral ganglia. The common commissure is relatively long and no wider than the strongest nerves. The proximal olfactory nodules are bulbous and nearly sessile, being slightly larger than the eyes; the distal ones are smaller and rounded.

The eyes are short-stalked with a maximum diameter of approximately 0.183 mm, possessing black pigment and a bright yellowish lens. The otocysts are slightly smaller than the eyes and contain about 100 small otoconia. The thin leaves of the rhinophores are heavily reinforced with densely packed, hardened, spindle-shaped spicules. The dorsal skin is also abundantly equipped with scattered or grouped spicules, and the surface contains masses of clear gland cells.

Digestive and reproductive systems:

The mouth tube is approximately 1.6 mm long, leading to a pharynx 1.5 mm in length. The radula contains 15 rows of teeth in total. In the hindmost row of the tongue, there are 13 dental plates, a number that increases to 20 toward the rear. The dental plates are a very pale yellow with a strongly developed wing. The innermost teeth are relatively short with low hooks, while the outermost plates feature a shortened body and variable, slender hooks.

The whitish salivary glands are slightly longer than the mouth tube and pharynx. The esophagus is slightly longer than the pharynx, leading to a sac-shaped stomach that projects freely over the hepatic cleft. The liver is truncated at the front with a deep cleft for the stomach and tapers to a short cone at the rear; its substance is dark grayish-brown. A whitish gallbladder is located on the right side of the stomach.

The pericardium and heart are of the usual form. The blood glands are strongly flattened and brownish-white. The hermaphroditic gland covers the liver entirely, contrasting with it due to its yellow color. The anterior genital mass is relatively large, consisting of a whitish mucous gland and a brownish, yolk-yellow albumin gland. The ampulla is sausage-shaped and whitish, leading to a short vas deferens and an unarmed penis.

== Distribution ==
This species was described from Japan.
