= Atagema molesta =

Scientific classification
- Kingdom: Animalia
- Phylum: Mollusca
- Class: Gastropoda
- Order: Nudibranchia
- Family: Discodorididae
- Genus: Atagema
- Species: A. molesta

Binomial name
- Atagema molesta (M. C. Miller, 1989)

Synonyms
- Trippa molesta M. C. Miller, 1989

Species of gastropod

Atagema molesta is a species of sea slug or dorid nudibranch, a marine gastropod mollusc in the family Discodorididae.

== Distribution ==
This species was described from the intertidal zone at Te Hāwere-a-Maki / Goat Island, Leigh, New Zealand.
