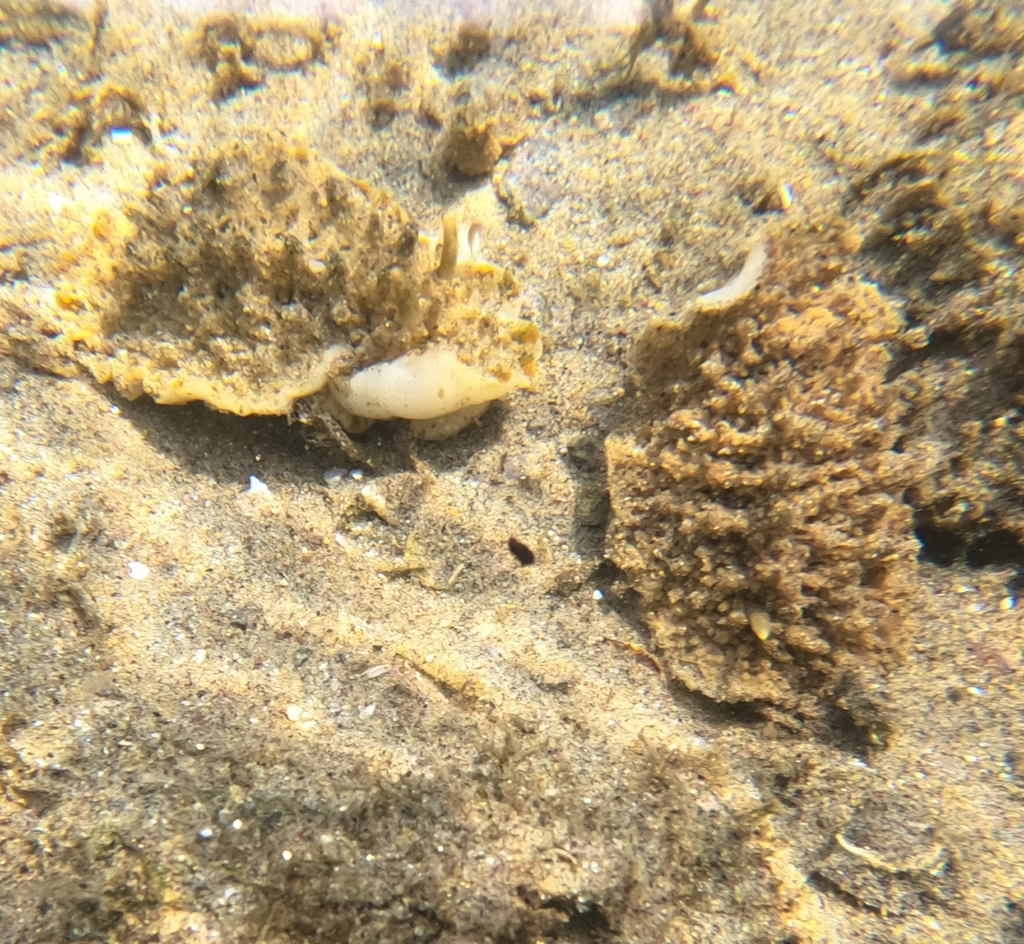

Scientific classification
- Kingdom: Animalia
- Phylum: Mollusca
- Class: Gastropoda
- Order: Nudibranchia
- Family: Discodorididae
- Genus: Atagema
- Species: A. notacristata

Binomial name
- Atagema notacristata Camacho-Garcia & Gosliner, 2008

= Atagema notacristata =

Species of gastropod

Atagema notacristata is a species of sea slug or dorid nudibranch, a marine gastropod mollusc in the family Discodorididae.

== Distribution ==
The holotype for this species was collected from Punta Uvita, Parque Nacional Marino Ballena, Area de Conservación Osa, Costa Rica (9°08′50″N 83°46′16″W). Numerous specimens from Costa Rica were included in the original description. Further records from Bahía de Banderas, Mexico and Coiba Island, Panama, were also reported.
