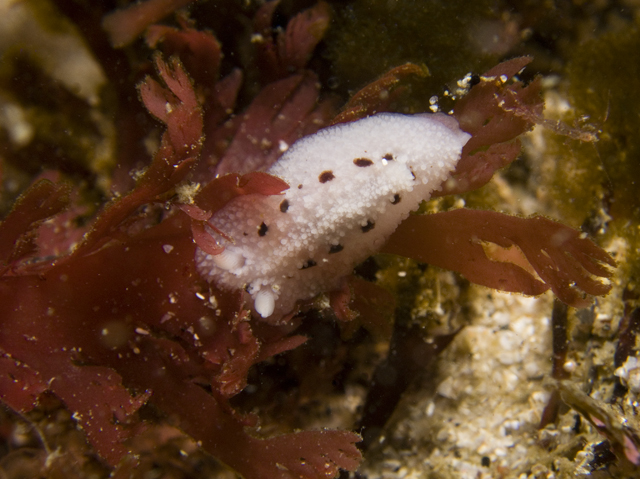

Scientific classification
- Kingdom: Animalia
- Phylum: Mollusca
- Class: Gastropoda
- Order: Nudibranchia
- Family: Discodorididae
- Genus: Atagema
- Species: A. rugosa

Binomial name
- Atagema rugosa Pruvot-Fol, 1951

= Atagema rugosa =

Species of gastropod

Atagema rugosa, the rugby-ball dorid, is a species of dorid nudibranch, a marine gastropod mollusc in the family Discodorididae.

== Distribution ==
This species was described from Cap l'Abeille, near Banyuls-sur-Mer, France. It has been reported from the bay of Gallipoli, Italy, in the Mediterranean Sea and around the southern African coast on the Atlantic side of the Cape Peninsula in 10–15 m of water. It is probable that the species known by this name in South Africa is actually a distinct species.

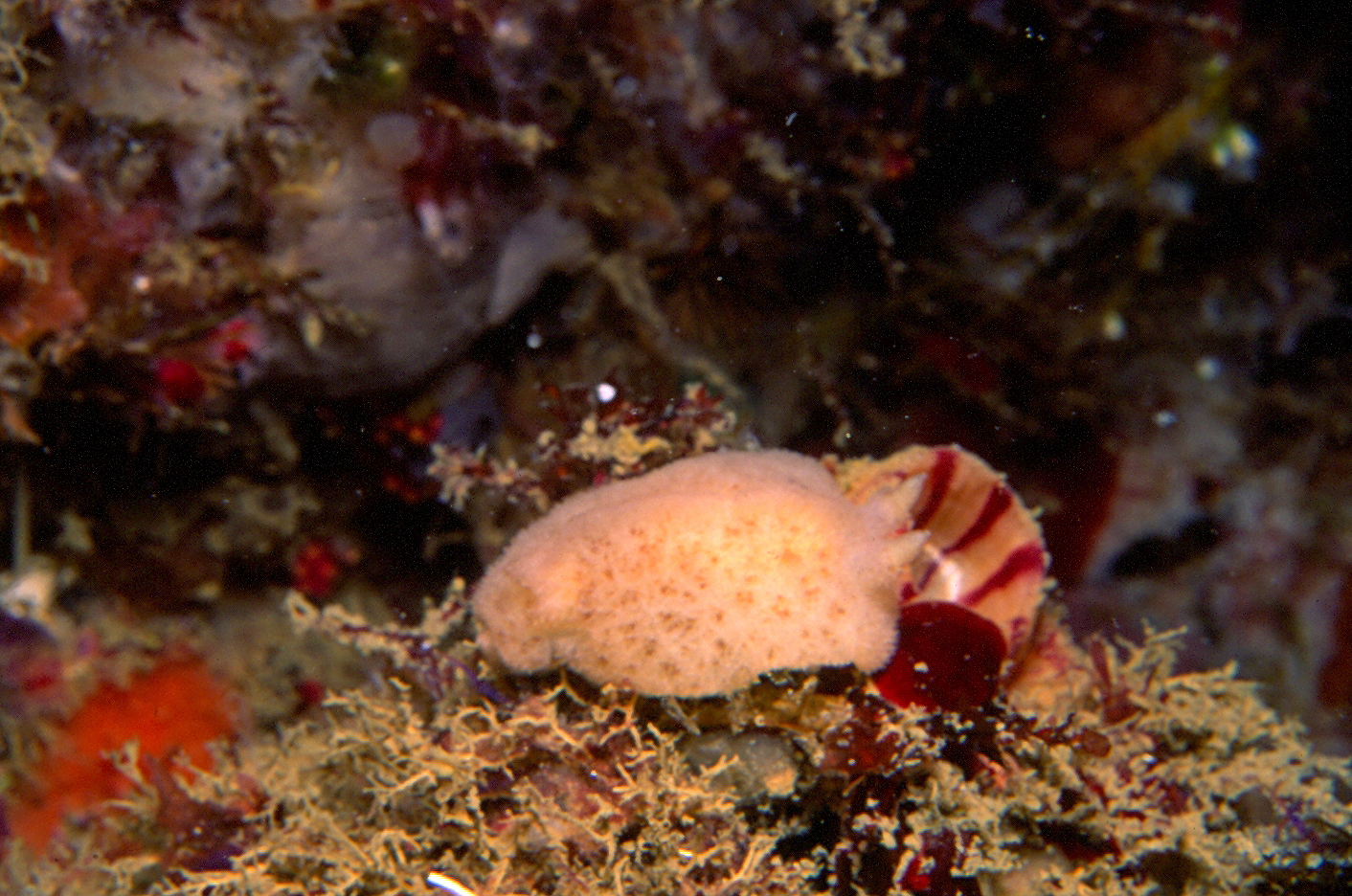
Atagema rugosa Pruvot-Fol, 1951 from France

== Description ==
Atagema rugosa is described as a beige animal, darker in the lower parts of the mantle. Its tubercles are arranged in crests forming a network. It has five gills, with the three posterior held almost horizontal and the two anterior very small. The South African rugby-ball dorid is a small white nudibranch with black spots, a warty skin and a distinct longitudinal ridge down the middle of its back. It has eight gills arranged around the anus and its rhinophores are perfoliate. It can reach a total length of 30 mm.

== Ecology ==
The rugby-ball dorid feeds on sponges.
