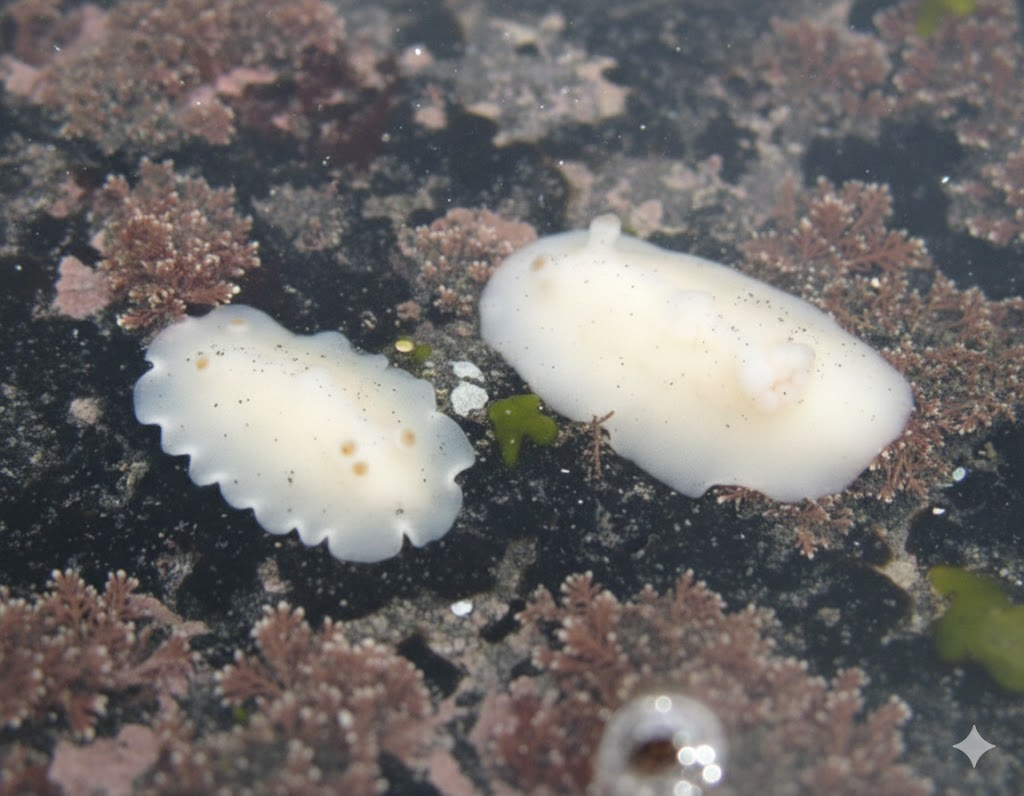
- live specimen of Atagema carinata

Scientific classification
- Kingdom: Animalia
- Phylum: Mollusca
- Class: Gastropoda
- Order: Nudibranchia
- Family: Discodorididae
- Genus: Atagema
- Species: A. carinata

Binomial name
- Atagema carinata (Quoy & Gaimard, 1832)

Synonyms
- Doris carinata Quoy & Gaimard, 1832

= Atagema carinata =

Species of gastropod

Atagema carinata is a species of dorid nudibranch in the family Discodorididae.

== Description ==
The length of the species attains 40 mm. The gills are small and at the end of a dorsal sack, with three lobes protecting them. This species has a dorsal ridge and caryophillidia with lateral ciliated areas.

== Distribution ==
This species was first recorded in the Firth of Thames in New Zealand in the 1820s, but has rarely been seen since. It appears to be a New Zealand endemic.
