= Diaulula alba =

Scientific classification
- Kingdom: Animalia
- Phylum: Mollusca
- Class: Gastropoda
- Order: Nudibranchia
- Family: Discodorididae
- Genus: Diaulula
- Species: D. alba

Binomial name
- Diaulula alba (K. White, 1952)

Species of gastropod

Diaulula alba is a species of sea slug or dorid nudibranch, a marine gastropod mollusk in the family Discodorididae.
