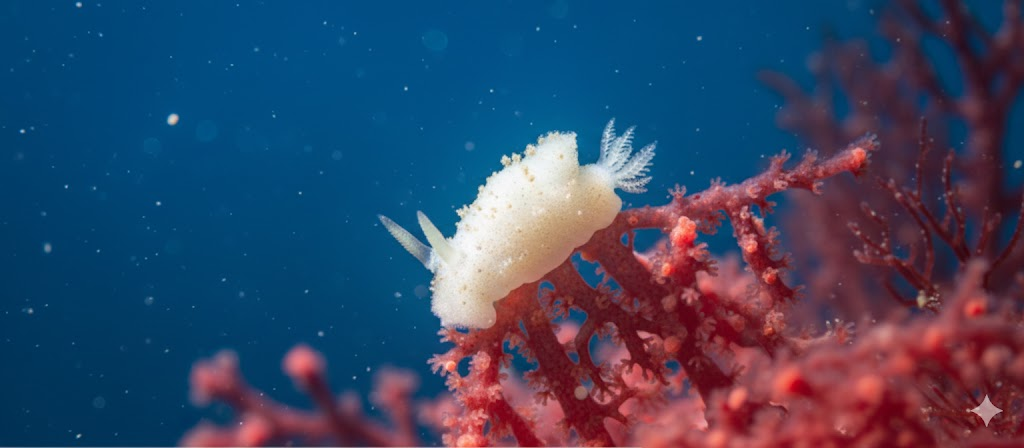
- Atagema alba (live specimen)

Scientific classification
- Kingdom: Animalia
- Phylum: Mollusca
- Class: Gastropoda
- Order: Nudibranchia
- Family: Discodorididae
- Genus: Atagema
- Species: A. alba

Binomial name
- Atagema alba (O'Donoghue, 1927)

Synonyms
- Atagema quadrimaculata Collier, 1963; Glossodoridiformia alba O'Donoghue, 1927 (original combination); Petelodoris spongicola MacFarland, 1966

= Atagema alba =

Hunchback doris

Species of gastropod

Atagema alba, common name the hunchback doris, is a species of sea slug or dorid nudibranch, a marine gastropod mollusk in the family Discodorididae.

== Description ==
A single individual was collected, measuring 30 mm in length and 11 mm in width during active crawling.

== Distribution ==
This species has been reported from Monterey Bay, California, USA south to Ensenada, Baja California, Mexico.

== Ecology ==
This dorid nudibranch feeds on sponges.
