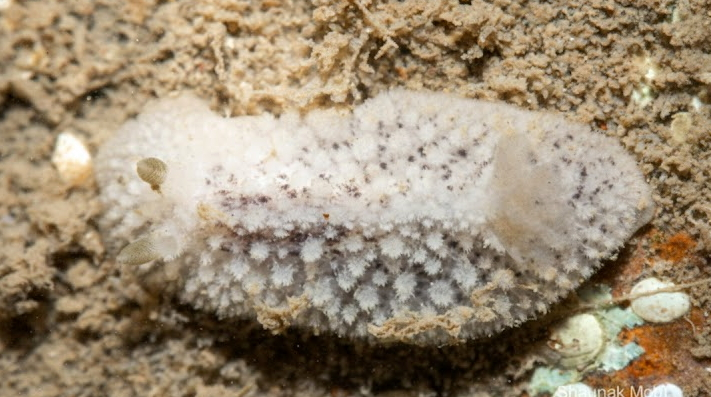
- Live specimen of Atagema osseosa

Scientific classification
- Kingdom: Animalia
- Phylum: Mollusca
- Class: Gastropoda
- Order: Nudibranchia
- Family: Discodorididae
- Genus: Atagema
- Species: A. osseosa

Binomial name
- Atagema osseosa (Kelaart, 1859)

Synonyms
- Doris osseosa Kelaart, 1859; Trippa osseosa (Kelaart, 1859)

= Atagema osseosa =

Species of gastropod

Atagema osseosa is a species of sea slug or dorid nudibranch, a marine gastropod mollusk in the family Discodorididae.

== Description ==
Atagema osseosa possesses a body approximately one inch in length (25.4 mm), protected by a mantle that is hard, cartilaginous, and characterized by a granular, pitted texture. These granules are distinguished by a pale, whitish color. Along the median line, a narrow ridge extends from the base of the tentacles to the branchial plumes. These plumes, typically numbering four or five, emerge horizontally from beneath the posterior termination of the dorsal ridge.

In some individuals, a large, pitted protuberance is situated at the center of this ridge. The dorsal tentacles are encased in large, granular sheaths and terminate in conical, lamellated apices of a pale green hue. In contrast, the oral tentacles are a pure white. The foot of the organism is notably small and narrow, while the branchial plumes are small and exhibit a delicate, bipinnated structure.

== Distribution ==
This species is found in the tropical Indo-West Pacific Ocean, with records at least from the coasts of India and eastern Australia.

== Ecology ==
This nudibranch has evolved to mimic closely in appearance the sandy-coloured sponge on which it both lives and feeds off.
