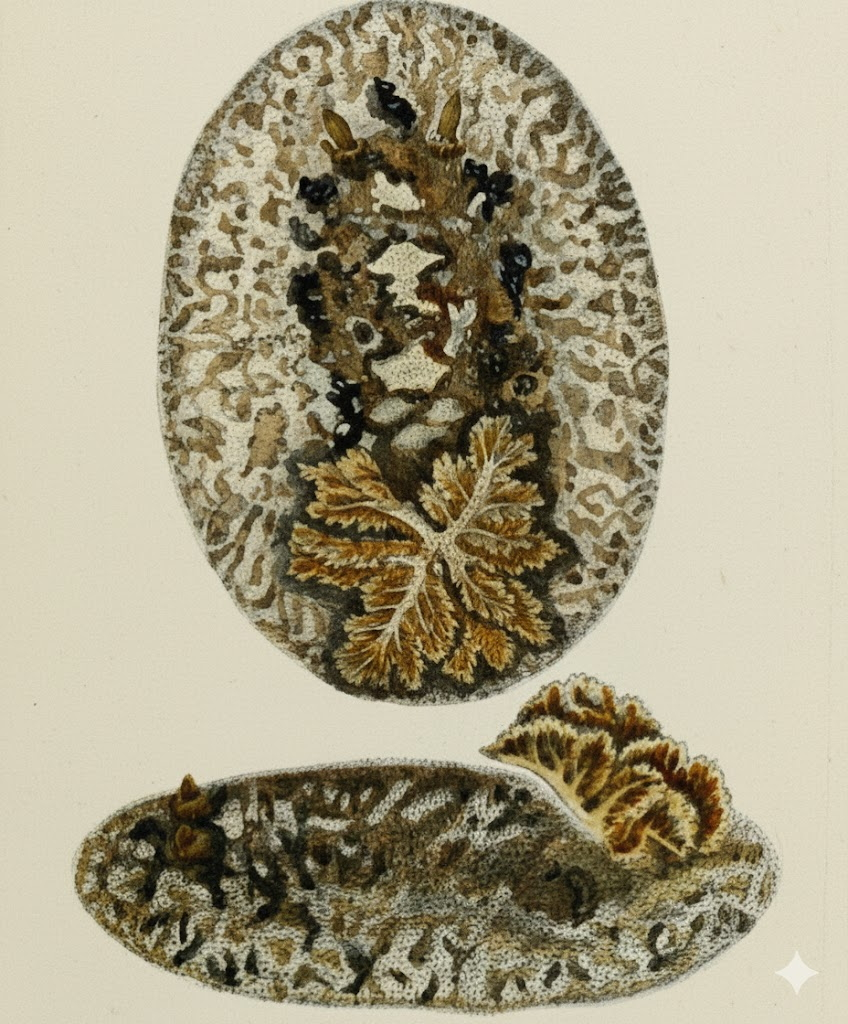
- Atagema tristis (holotype)

Scientific classification
- Kingdom: Animalia
- Phylum: Mollusca
- Class: Gastropoda
- Order: Nudibranchia
- Family: Discodorididae
- Genus: Atagema
- Species: A. tristis

Binomial name
- Atagema tristis (Alder & Hancock, 1864)

Synonyms
- Doris tristis Alder & Hancock, 1864

= Atagema tristis =

Species of gastropod

Atagema tristis is a species of sea slug or dorid nudibranch, a marine gastropod mollusc in the family Discodorididae.

== Description ==
(Original description) The body is ovate-oblong in shape and slightly raised. The cloak (mantle) is firm and coriaceous, characterized by angular ridges and swellings situated on each side of the back, along with a few tubercular elevations at the sides. Its entire surface is covered with minute tubercles, which are particularly dense on the ridges and swellings. The hollow spaces between these elevations are minutely reticulated with pale lines, while the interstices appear dark or black. A deep depression occupies the center of the frontal back, immediately followed by a large, conical protuberance.

The ground-color of the cloak is a dusky olive, marked by a few scattered dark brown freckles on the sides and along the margin. The underside of the mantle shares the same color as the upper surface and is similarly reticulated and freckled with small black spots.

The dorsal tentacles are retractile within elevated and minutely tuberculated sheaths; they are dark olive in color, featuring pale and denticulated margins. These tentacles are relatively small and possess minute laminae that are divided in front by a depression. They are dark in hue, though the tips are white and pointed. The oral tentacles are small and linear in form.

The four branchial plumes are tripinnate in structure, spreading laterally and appearing somewhat paler than the cloak. The margin of the branchial orifice is significantly elevated and undulated, produced in the front into a large, erect lobe. The foot is ample, featuring a large, deeply notched lamina at the front and a rounded posterior. During progression, the foot extends slightly beyond the cloak, and its upper surface is freckled with black.

The total length of the organism is two inches or upward (approximately 50.8 mm).

== Distribution ==
This species was described from India.
