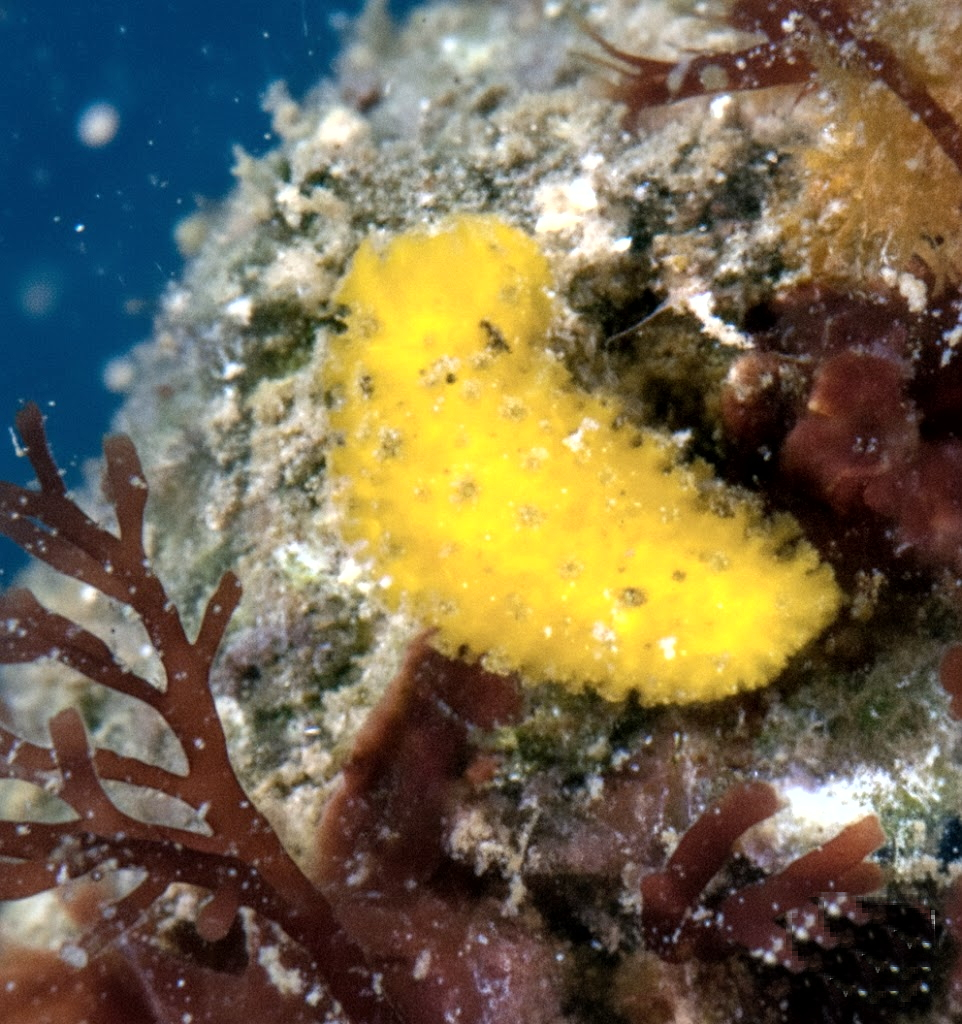
- live specimen of Atagema echinata

Scientific classification
- Kingdom: Animalia
- Phylum: Mollusca
- Class: Gastropoda
- Order: Nudibranchia
- Family: Discodorididae
- Genus: Atagema
- Species: A. echinata

Binomial name
- Atagema echinata Pease, 1860

Synonyms
- Doris echinata Pease, 1860; Trippa echinata (Pease, 1860)

= Atagema echinata =

Species of gastropod

Atagema echinata is a species of sea slug or dorid nudibranch, a marine gastropod mollusc in the family Discodorididae.

== Description ==
(Original description) The body is oblong-ovate, rigid, and scabrous, with a dorsal surface that is rounded above. The mantle is small, appearing rounded in front and acuminately rounded behind; notably, it does not cover the foot along its posterior half. The entire dorsal region is covered with spinose globular granules.

The branchial plumes are inserted at the posterior tip of the mantle. These consist of five arborescent, tripinnate plumes that are procumbent posteriorly, encircling the vent and remaining retractile into a common cavity.

The dorsal tentacles (rhinophores) are large, ovate, and obtusely mucronate. They are obliquely and coarsely laminated, set upon stout peduncles, and are retractile into tubular cavities. The labial tentacles are small and taper cylindrically.

The foot is large and oblong, being bluntly rounded at the front, which represents its widest portion. It gradually tapers toward the posterior into a tip that is rudely crenulated. The coloration is a light grayish-brown, which becomes significantly paler on the underside; a few brown dots are visible along the posterior edge of the mantle.

== Distribution ==
This species was described from the Hawaiian Islands. It has also been reported from the Mariana Islands.
