= Atagema anceps =

Scientific classification
- Kingdom: Animalia
- Phylum: Mollusca
- Class: Gastropoda
- Order: Nudibranchia
- Family: Discodorididae
- Genus: Atagema
- Species: A. anceps

Binomial name
- Atagema anceps (Bergh, 1890)

Synonyms
- Phlegmodoris anceps Bergh, 1890; Trippa anceps (Bergh, 1890)

Species of gastropod

Atagema anceps is a species of sea slug or dorid nudibranch, a marine gastropod mollusc in the family Discodorididae.

== Description ==
(Original description in German) The length of the holotype was 10 mm, with a width of up to 5 mm and a height of up to 2 mm; the length of the foot was 7 mm with a width of up to 2.2 mm; the width of the mantle brim was 2 mm; the height of the rhinophore sheath was 0.8 mm, and that of the branchial (gill) mound was 1 mm.

The color was a light, dirty yellowish throughout, with dark, raised points (tubercles) on the back. The consistency of the body was quite soft.

The shape was oblong-oval and flattened, with a broad and fairly thin mantle brim. The back showed indications of a median ridge and, on each side, a lateral ridge following the border of the actual back. Otherwise, the back was covered everywhere with scattered, pointed tubercles which, especially on the mantle brim, were often connected to one another by extensions. On the median ridge, as well as on the high rhinophore sheaths and the high gill mound, the tubercles were taller and more densely packed, particularly at the margins of the latter structures. The club of the rhinophores was roughly as high as the rhinophore sheath, possessing about 25 thin leaves; the gill was formed of 5 simply-pinnate leaves (occasionally double-pinnate) up to 1.2 mm high, of which the 3 anterior ones were taller; the anal papilla was low. The underside of the mantle brim was smooth. The body sides were very low; the genital papilla was as usual. The foot was not narrow, rounded at the front with a marginal groove; the upper lip was strongly projecting and notched in the middle; the tail was not entirely short. The tentacles were finger-shaped.

The central nervous system was flattened; the cerebro-pleural ganglia were fairly rounded, with the boundary between the two divisions poorly defined; the pedal ganglia were rounded, larger than the pleural ganglia, and situated outside of them. The proximal olfactory nodes were almost sessile and quite large; the buccal and gastro-oesophageal ganglia, which almost touched each other, were as usual; the spherical sessile optic ganglia were smaller than the eyes.

The eyes were quite large, almost sessile, with abundant black pigment. The otocysts (auditory vesicles) were somewhat smaller than the eyes, approximately 0.08 mm in diameter, teeming with otoconia of the usual kind which reached a diameter of up to 0.009 mm. In the leaves of the rhinophores were long but not strongly hardened spicules, positioned vertically and obliquely on the leaf margin. In the dorsal skin were very numerous, long, more or less hardened spicules, which also occurred in the tubercles (sometimes in bundles), though here they were less hardened and mostly protruded with their tips at the apex of the tubercles. The same arrangement was observed on the rhinophore sheaths and the gill mound.

The mouth tube, whitish on the outside and yellowish on the inside, was strong and about 1.5 mm long; several gland-like bodies appeared to discharge into the rear. The powerful pharyngeal bulb was about as long as the mouth tube; at the rear of the underside, the radular sac protruded as a thick papilla. The strong, rounded, yellowish-grey lip disk was covered by a thick yellow cuticle. The tongue was broad and somewhat flattened; in the broad yellow radula there were 7 rows of dental plates, the first of which was very incomplete; further back were 8 developed rows and two younger rows, making the total number 17. The rhachis was quite broad and bare; there were 17–18 lateral plates on each side at the back of the tongue, and 19–20 further back. The dental plates were horn-yellow. The length of the 4 innermost plates was mostly 0.06–0.08–0.1–0.11 mm; the height of the hook of the other plates rose to 0.11 mm, while that of the outermost plates was only 0.04–0.06 mm. The 4 innermost plates were slightly curved, more slender, and more upright; following these, the form that persists through the row quickly develops—the most common hook shape; the outermost or the two outermost plates had a shortened body and stood more upright; the outermost was more slender than those immediately preceding it.

The whitish salivary glands were elongated. The esophagus was roughly as long as the pharyngeal bulb and quite wide. The 1.5 mm long free stomach and the intestine were as usual. The digestive cavity was empty. The posterior visceral mass (liver) was short-conical, obliquely truncated at the front, rounded at the back, and dirty-whitish.

The pericardium and heart were as usual, as were the flattened, grayish-white blood glands.

The hermaphroditic gland (ovotestis) seemed to cover the largest part of the liver and was hardly any lighter in color; masses of spermatozoa were found in the lobes. The anterior genital mass was about 1.5 mm long and somewhat compressed; the ampulla of the hermaphroditic duct was quite thick, sausage-shaped, curved, and when stretched was a little longer than the genital mass, opaque yellowish-white. The vas deferens was not long, and the short penis appeared unarmed. The spermatheca was spherical; the spermatocyst was sac-shaped, curved, and slightly smaller. The mucous gland, forming the largest part of the genital mass, was whitish, while the albuminous gland was yellowish.

== Distribution ==
This species has been reported from the Caribbean Sea.
