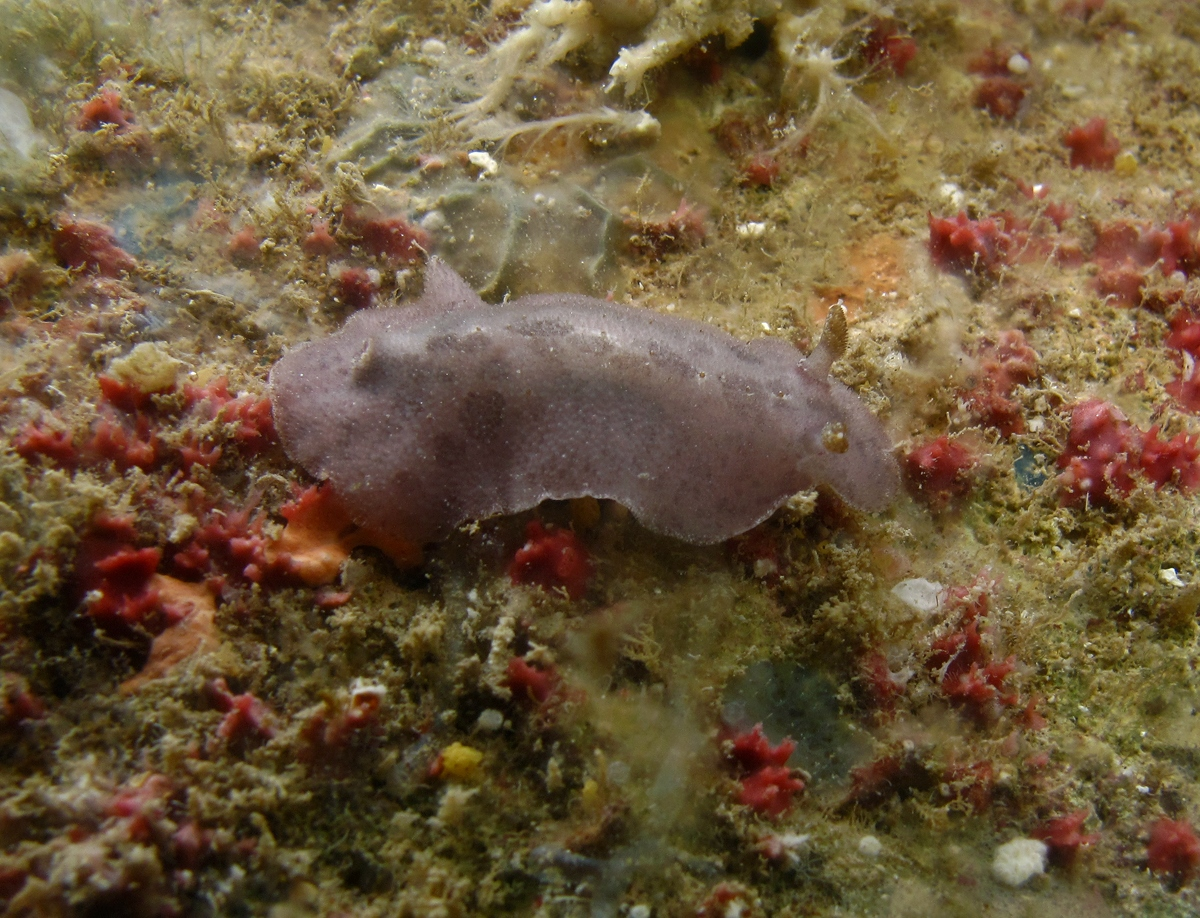
- Peltodoris murrea

Scientific classification
- Kingdom: Animalia
- Phylum: Mollusca
- Class: Gastropoda
- Order: Nudibranchia
- Family: Discodorididae
- Genus: Peltodoris
- Species: P. murrea

Binomial name
- Peltodoris murrea (Abraham, 1877)

Synonyms
- Discodoris mauritiana Bergh, 1889; Doris murrea Abraham, 1877 (original combination); Peltodoris mauritiana Bergh, 1889

= Peltodoris murrea =

Species of gastropod

Peltodoris murrea is a species of sea slug, a dorid nudibranch, shell-less marine gastropod mollusks in the family Discodorididae.
