= Atagema spinosa =

Scientific classification
- Kingdom: Animalia
- Phylum: Mollusca
- Class: Gastropoda
- Order: Nudibranchia
- Family: Discodorididae
- Genus: Atagema
- Species: A. spinosa

Binomial name
- Atagema spinosa (Risbec, 1928)

Synonyms
- Trippa spinosa Risbec, 1928

Species of gastropod

Atagema spinosa is a species of sea slug or dorid nudibranch, a marine gastropod mollusc in the family Discodorididae.

== Distribution ==
This species was described from New Caledonia.
