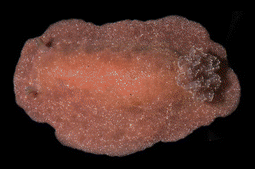
- Dorsal view of Diaulula phoca.

Scientific classification
- Kingdom: Animalia
- Phylum: Mollusca
- Class: Gastropoda
- Order: Nudibranchia
- Family: Discodorididae
- Genus: Diaulula
- Species: D. phoca

Binomial name
- Diaulula phoca (Ev. Marcus & Er. Marcus, 1967)

Synonyms
- Discodoris phoca Ev. Marcus & Er. Marcus, 1967; Montereina phoca (Ev. Marcus & Er. Marcus, 1967)

= Diaulula phoca =

Species of gastropod

Diaulula phoca is a species of sea slug or dorid nudibranch, a marine gastropod mollusc in the family Discodorididae.

== Taxonomy ==
This species was originally described under the name Discodoris phoca by Eveline Du Bois-Reymond Marcus and Ernst Gustav Gotthelf Marcus in 1967. It is considered a member of Diaulula because of the presence of caryophyllidia.

== Distribution ==
Distribution of Diaulula phoca includes Florida, Honduras, Costa Rica, Brazil and Panama.

The type locality is west side of the Key Biscayne island, Florida. The holotype is stored in the National Museum of Natural History, Smithsonian Institution.

== Description ==
The body is oval. Mantle is rigid. Dorsum is covered with small caryophyllidia. Body, rhinophores, and gill are dark purplish brown with numerous small opaque white dots. It is up to 55 mm long.

== Ecology ==
It feeds on sponges.
