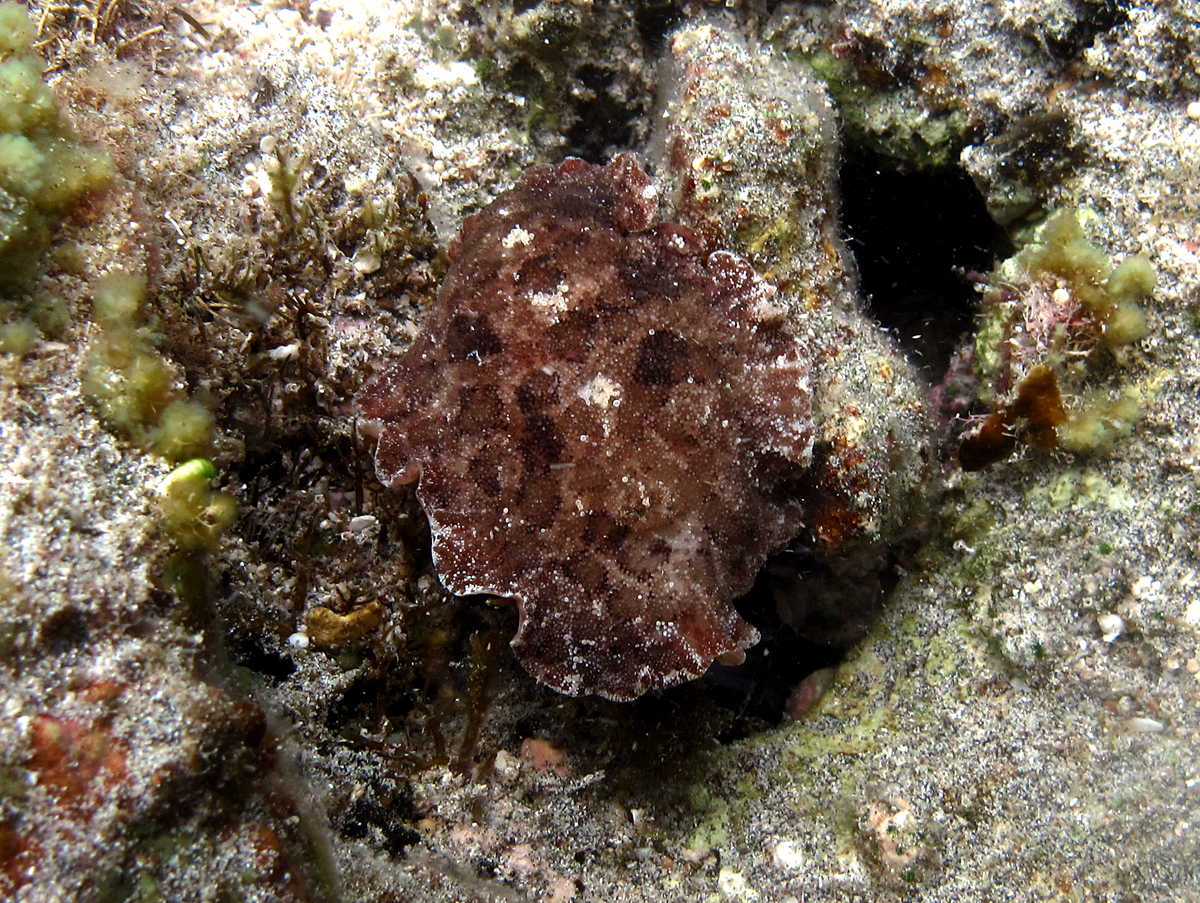
- Tayuva

Scientific classification
- Kingdom: Animalia
- Phylum: Mollusca
- Class: Gastropoda
- Order: Nudibranchia
- Family: Discodorididae
- Genus: Tayuva; Er. Marcus & Ev. Marcus, 1967

Type species
- Tayuva ketos Marcus & Marcus, 1967

= Tayuva =

Genus of gastropods

Tayuva is a genus of sea slugs, dorid nudibranchs, shell-less marine gastropod mollusks in the family Discodorididae.

== Species ==
- Tayuva lilacina (Gould, 1852)

Species brought into synonymy

- Tayuva ketos Marcus & Marcus, 1967 : synonym of Tayuva lilacina (Gould, 1852)

== Taxonomy ==
Dayrat (2010) places Discodoris lilacina (Gould, 1852) in the genus Tayuva Marcus & Marcus, 1967 (type species by original designation: Tayuva ketos Marcus & Marcus, 1967, from Pacific coast of Mexico) on the basis of a synapomorphy “a muscular wall in the distal portion of the reproductive system”. D.”codoris lilacina in the current sense (e.g. Valdés, 2002) is indicated as “Tayuva lilacina of tropical Indo-West Pacific”, and several worldwide species currently recognized as valid are subsumed: Tayuva ketos as “Tayuva lilacina of Panamic Eastern Pacific” (contra Valdés, 2002 who holds Tayuva as a synonym of Discodoris and Discodoris ketos (Marcus & Marcus, 1967) as a valid species); Peltodoris hummelincki Marcus & Marcus, 1963 as “Tayuva lilacina of the Caribbean Sea”; Discodoris maculosa Bergh, 1884 as “Tayuva lilacina of the Mediterranean and Eastern European Atlantic”. Dayrat nevertheless acknowledges (p. 78) that “The tame T. lilacina, as used here, likely refers to a species complex”. A.” Alternatively,se could be treated as valid species under Discodoris, following Valdés' (2002) view.
