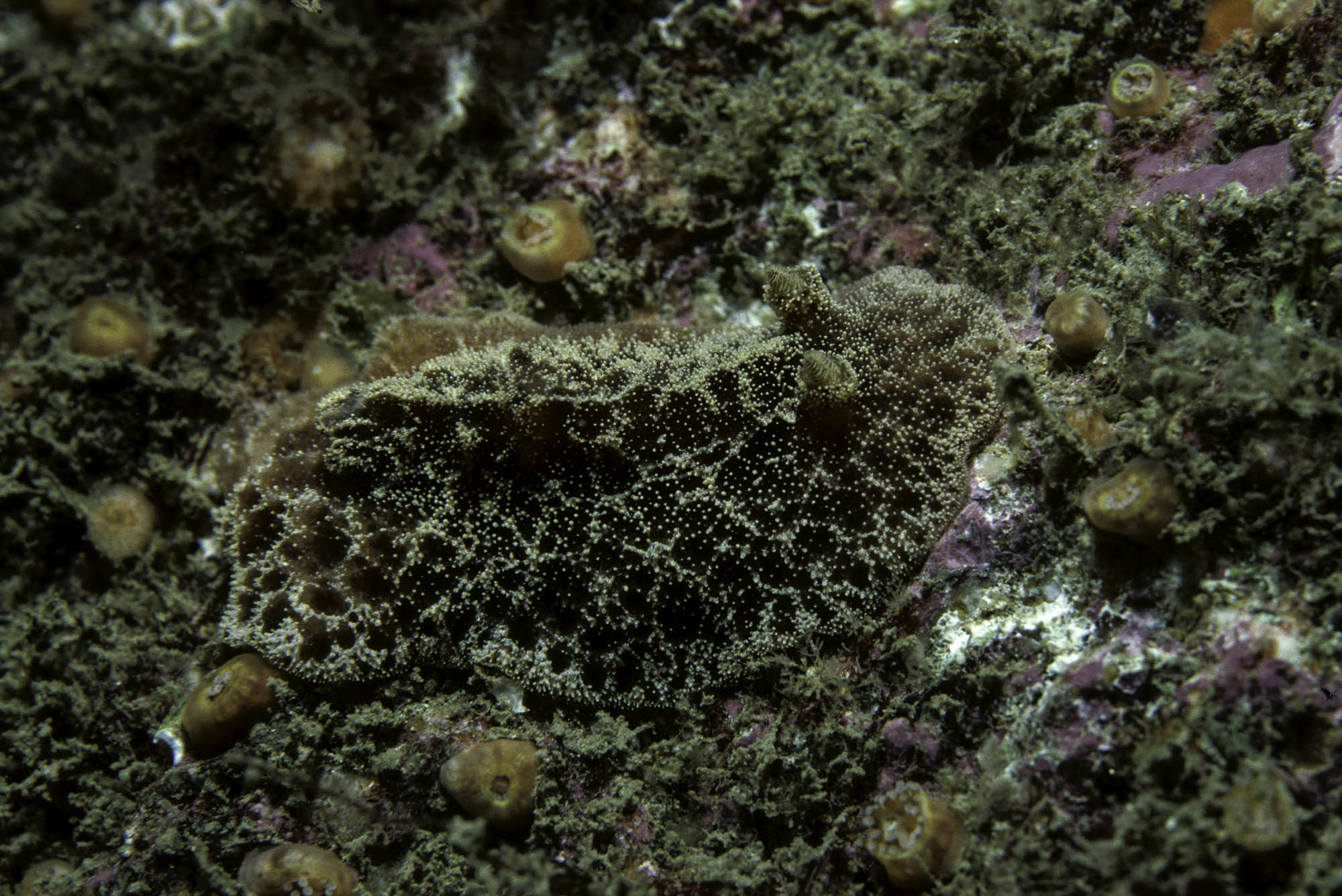
- The nudibranch Atagema gibba, Gap Point, St. Mary's, Scilly Isles.

Scientific classification
- Kingdom: Animalia
- Phylum: Mollusca
- Class: Gastropoda
- Order: Nudibranchia
- Family: Discodorididae
- Genus: Atagema
- Species: A. gibba

Binomial name
- Atagema gibba Pruvot-Fol, 1951

= Atagema gibba =

Species of gastropod

Atagema gibba is a species of sea slug or dorid nudibranch, a marine gastropod mollusk in the family Discodorididae.

== Distribution ==
This species was described from France. It has been reported from the NE Atlantic from Cornwall south to the Mediterranean Sea.

== Ecology ==
This dorid nudibranch feeds on sponges.
