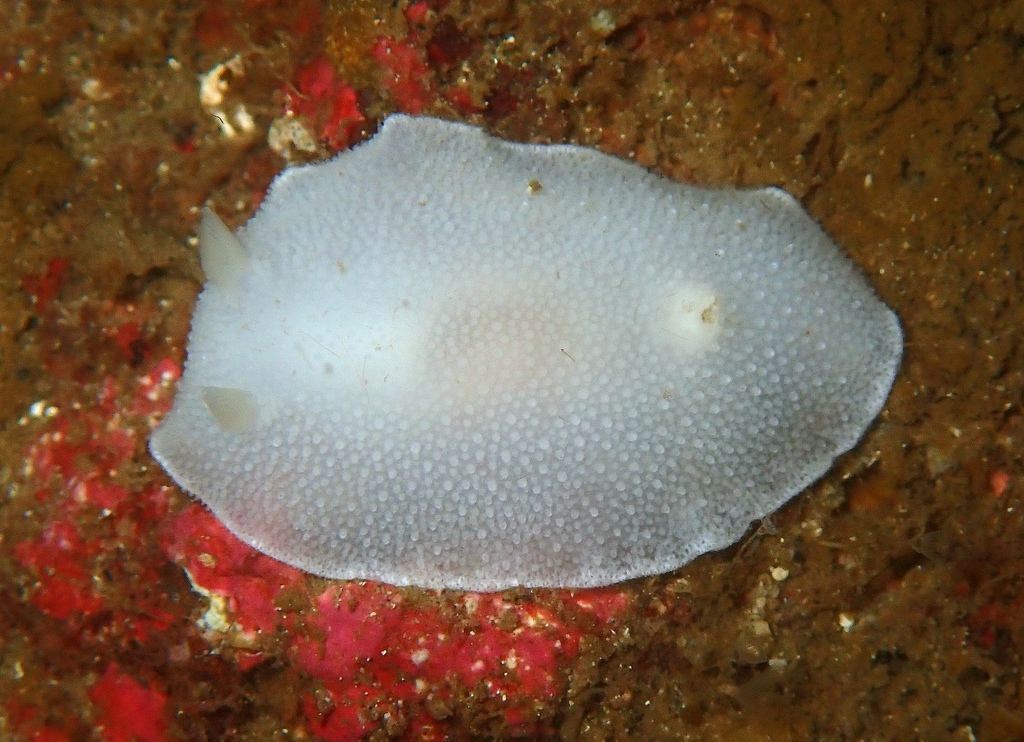

Scientific classification
- Kingdom: Animalia
- Phylum: Mollusca
- Class: Gastropoda
- Order: Nudibranchia
- Superfamily: Doridoidea
- Family: Discodorididae
- Genus: Peltodoris
- Species: P. lentiginosa

Binomial name
- Peltodoris lentiginosa (Millen, 1982)

Synonyms
- Anisodoris lentignosa Millen, 1982; Diaulula lentiginosa (Millen, 1982) (Although Anisodoris is accepted as a synonym of Diaulula, this species has no caryophyllidia and cannot therefore be included in Diaulula); "Montereina" lentiginosa (Millen, 1982)· accepted, alternate representation

= Peltodoris lentiginosa =

Species of sea slug

Peltodoris lentiginosa, also known as the mottled pale sea lemon or the giant freckled dorid, is a species of sea slug. It is a dorid nudibranch in the family Discodorididae.

== Description ==
Peltodoris lentiginosa's dorsum is covered in tubercules, giving it a bumpy texture. Its coloration is splotchy, with different shades of brown patches covering its body; however, pure white coloration has also been observed. It has six gills which are white to off-white in coloration and located toward the back of its body; its rhinophores share this coloration. Its length is approximately 18 cm.

== Distribution ==
Peltodoris lentiginosa has been recorded from Kodiak Island, Alaska, to Capa Arago, Oregon. It is found primarily at intertidal depths to around 33 m.

== Ecology ==
Peltodoris lentiginosa feeds on yellow encrusting sponges. It has also been observed to feed on glass sponges.
