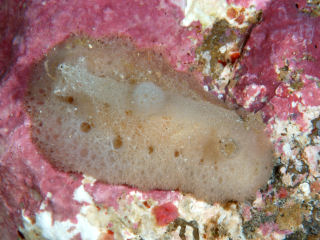

Scientific classification
- Kingdom: Animalia
- Phylum: Mollusca
- Class: Gastropoda
- Order: Nudibranchia
- Family: Discodorididae
- Genus: Atagema
- Species: A. spongiosa

Binomial name
- Atagema spongiosa (Kelaart, 1858) synonyms = : Atagema paagoumenei (Risbec, 1928) junior subjective synonym; Dendrodoris areolata (Alder & Hancock, 1864) junior homonym; Doris areolata Alder & Hancock, 1864 ·; Doris spongiosa Kelaart, 1858; Phlegmodoris mephitica Bergh, 1878; Phlegmodoris paagoumenei Risbec, 1928; Trippa (Phlegmodoris) paagoumenei Risbec, 1928 junior subjective synonym

= Atagema spongiosa =

Species of gastropod

Atagema spongiosa is a species of sea slug or dorid nudibranch, a marine gastropod mollusk in the family Discodorididae.

== Description ==
The body is oval and flattened, characterized by a dorsal surface covered in prominent, rounded tubercles that gradually decrease in size toward the mantle margin. A distinct longitudinal ridge runs centrally along the midline, spanning the area between the rhinophores and the gill. This ridge is flanked on either side by a series of depressions that also diminish in size as they approach the mantle edge. Apart from these recessed depressions, the entire dorsal surface is densely carpeted with caryophyllidia (specialized, microscopic sensory organs located on the dorsal surface of the mantle).

The branchial sheath is divided into three large, well-defined lobes. The gill itself consists of five tripinnate branchial leaves, which are held in a horizontal orientation in living specimens. The rhinophoral sheaths are elevated, housing elongated rhinophores that feature 24 individual lamellae. Notably, juvenile specimens exhibit less pronounced dorsal tubercles compared to adults.

In adult specimens, the body color is an opaque grayish-brown, with the exception of the depressions, which range from dark brown to black. In contrast, juveniles are a translucent gray. Both the rhinophores and the branchial leaves have the same color with the rest of the dorsum.

== Distribution ==
This species was described from Sri Lanka. It is reported to be widespread in the tropical Indo-West Pacific Ocean and off Australia.
