= Diaulula immaculata =

Scientific classification
- Kingdom: Animalia
- Phylum: Mollusca
- Class: Gastropoda
- Order: Nudibranchia
- Family: Discodorididae
- Genus: Diaulula
- Species: D. immaculata

Binomial name
- Diaulula immaculata Valdes, 2001

Species of gastropod

Diaulula immaculata is a species of sea slug or dorid nudibranch, a marine gastropod mollusk in the family Discodorididae.
