= Diaulula nivosa =

Scientific classification
- Kingdom: Animalia
- Phylum: Mollusca
- Class: Gastropoda
- Order: Nudibranchia
- Family: Discodorididae
- Genus: Diaulula
- Species: D. nivosa

Binomial name
- Diaulula nivosa Valdés & Bertsch, 2010

Species of gastropod

Diaulula nivosa is a species of sea slug or dorid nudibranch, a marine gastropod mollusk in the family Discodorididae.
