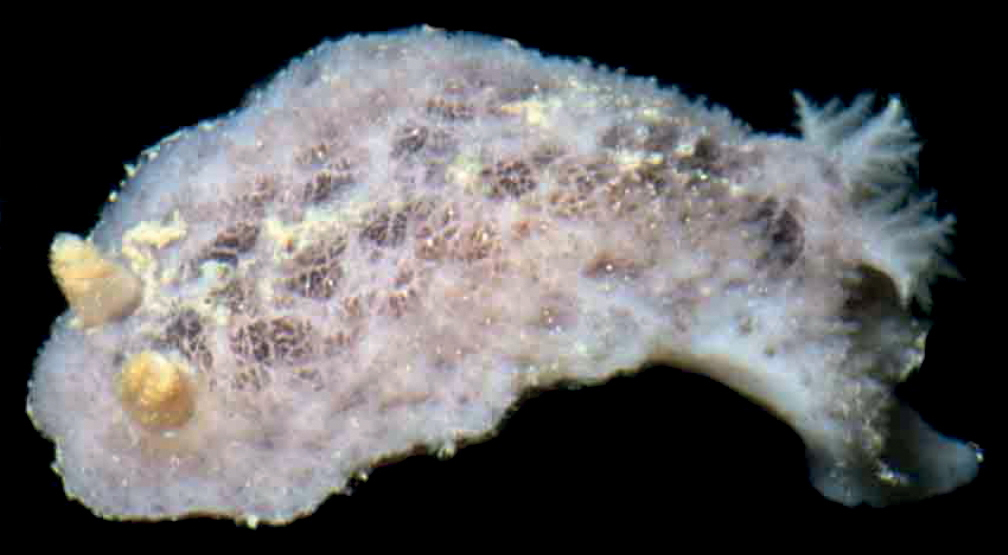
- Live specimen of Atagema papillosa

Scientific classification
- Kingdom: Animalia
- Phylum: Mollusca
- Class: Gastropoda
- Order: Nudibranchia
- Family: Discodorididae
- Genus: Atagema
- Species: A. papillosa

Binomial name
- Atagema papillosa (Risbec, 1928) synonyms = Phlegmodoris papillosa Risbec, 1928 superseded combination

= Atagema papillosa =

Species of gastropod

Atagema papillosa is a species of sea slug or dorid nudibranch, a marine gastropod mollusk in the family Discodorididae.

== Description ==
The body is oval and flattened, distinguished by a complex network of integumentary ridges organized into two distinct levels. The primary, larger ridges extend across the entire dorsal surface, creating prominent depressions in the spaces between them. Within these primary depressions, a second level of smaller, finer ridges further subdivides the area into smaller fragments. With the exception of these recessed fragments, the entire dorsum is densely covered with caryophyllidia (specialized, microscopic sensory organs located on the dorsal surface of the mantle).

The branchial sheath is composed of three large, pronounced lobes. The respiratory organ consists of five tripinnate branchial leaves, which are oriented horizontally in living individuals. The rhinophoral sheaths are elevated, protecting elongated rhinophores that bear 16 lamellae.

The body is an opaque gray, punctuated by scattered yellow spots. Within the depressions, the secondary gray ridges contrast with the dark gray to black fragments they enclose. The gill leaves have the same color with the dorsum, while the rhinophores range in color from grayish to a yellowish-cream.

== Distribution ==
This marine species occurs off New Caledonia.
