= Atagema scabriuscula =

Scientific classification
- Kingdom: Animalia
- Phylum: Mollusca
- Class: Gastropoda
- Order: Nudibranchia
- Family: Discodorididae
- Genus: Atagema
- Species: A. scabriuscula

Binomial name
- Atagema scabriuscula (Pease, 1860)

Synonyms
- Doris scabriuscula Pease, 1860; Trippa scabriuscula (Pease, 1860)

Species of gastropod

Atagema scabriuscula is a species of sea slug or dorid nudibranch, a marine gastropod mollusc in the family Discodorididae.

== Description ==
The length of the animal is 38.4 mm (1 inch 4 lines)

(Original description) The body is oblong-ovate in form, possessing a rigid and scabrous texture that is convexly rounded above. The mantle, which entirely conceals the foot, is rounded at both ends and reaches its widest point in the middle. Its upper surface is covered with mammillated, conical tubercles; these tubercles decrease in size towards the margins and are united by a network of elevated, net-like reticulations.

The six branchial plumes are placed far back on the body and are of moderate size and suberect. These plumes are arborescent and tripinnate in structure, and they are fully retractile into a common, simple cavity. Similarly, the dorsal tentacles are oblong-ovate and acute, being rudely lamellated in an oblique fashion; they are also retractile into their own simple cavities. The labial tentacles are small and lobed, while the foot is oval, elongate, and rounded at both ends.

The upper surface of the species is a greyish-olive, marked with three longitudinal series of dusky spots. The dorsal tubercles and the surrounding reticulations are whitish. The dorsal tentacles appear pale with dusky lamellae, and the branchiae are a dusky ash color. Finally, the disk of the foot is whitish, accented with a pale yellowish tinge.

== Distribution ==
This species was described from the Hawaiian Islands. It is a fairly common species in the intertidal zone and shallow water.
