= Atagema browni =

Scientific classification
- Kingdom: Animalia
- Phylum: Mollusca
- Class: Gastropoda
- Order: Nudibranchia
- Family: Discodorididae
- Genus: Atagema
- Species: A. browni

Binomial name
- Atagema browni Thompson, 1980

Species of gastropod

Atagema browni is a species of sea slug or dorid nudibranch, a marine gastropod mollusc in the family Discodorididae.

== Distribution ==
This marine species was described from Jamaica.
