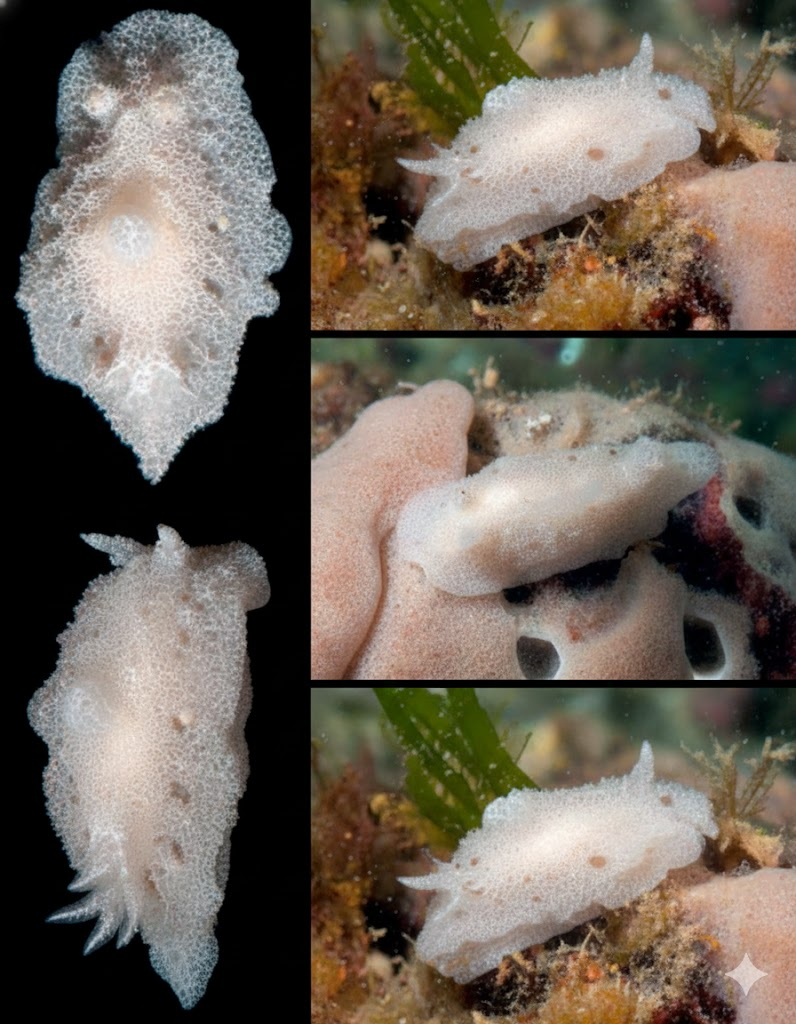
- Live specimen of Atagema sobanovae

Scientific classification
- Kingdom: Animalia
- Phylum: Mollusca
- Class: Gastropoda
- Order: Nudibranchia
- Family: Discodorididae
- Genus: Atagema
- Species: A. sobanovae

Binomial name
- Atagema sobanovae Innabi, Stout & Á. Valdés, 2023 synonyms =

= Atagema sobanovae =

Species of gastropod

Atagema sobanovae is a species of sea slug or dorid nudibranch, a marine gastropod mollusk in the family Discodorididae.

== Description ==
The length of the species attains 22 mm.

(Original description) The body is oval and elevated, entirely enveloped in a dense, intricate network of delicate ridges. At the intersections of these ridges, prominent caryophyllidia are situated. Flanking the mantle are series of small depressions that remain notably free of both ridges and caryophyllidia (specialized, microscopic sensory organs located on the dorsal surface of the mantle). A singular, elevated dorsal hump is positioned at the center of the dorsum, though this feature is absent in juvenile specimens.

The branchial sheath is trilobate, while the gill itself comprises five tripinnate leaves that are oriented horizontally in the living animal. The rhinophoral sheaths are distinctly elevated, housing elongated rhinophores characterized by 8–10 individual lamellae. The body displays an opaque, creamy-gray coloration, with the depressions appearing slightly darker. Both the rhinophores and the branchial leaves are concolorous with the rest of the dorsum.

== Distribution ==
This marine species occurs off New Caledonia.
