= Atagema albata =

Scientific classification
- Kingdom: Animalia
- Phylum: Mollusca
- Class: Gastropoda
- Order: Nudibranchia
- Family: Discodorididae
- Genus: Atagema
- Species: A. albata

Binomial name
- Atagema albata (Burn, 1962)

Synonyms
- Trippa albata Burn, 1962

Species of gastropod

Atagema albata is a species of sea slug or dorid nudibranch, a marine gastropod mollusc in the family Discodorididae.

This is a species inquirendum

== Distribution ==
This species was described from Victoria, Australia. It has also been reported from the Sunshine Coast, Queensland, Australia.
