= Diaulula aurila =

Scientific classification
- Kingdom: Animalia
- Phylum: Mollusca
- Class: Gastropoda
- Order: Nudibranchia
- Family: Discodorididae
- Genus: Diaulula
- Species: D. aurila

Binomial name
- Diaulula aurila (Ev. & Er. Marcus, 1967)

Species of gastropod

Diaulula aurila is a species of sea slug or dorid nudibranch, a marine gastropod mollusk in the family Discodorididae.
