= Atagema boucheti =

Scientific classification
- Kingdom: Animalia
- Phylum: Mollusca
- Class: Gastropoda
- Order: Nudibranchia
- Family: Discodorididae
- Genus: Atagema
- Species: A. boucheti

Binomial name
- Atagema boucheti Valdés & Gosliner, 2001

Species of gastropod

Atagema boucheti is a species of sea slug or dorid nudibranch, a marine gastropod mollusc in the family Discodorididae.

== Distribution ==
This marine species has been reported from New Caledonia.
