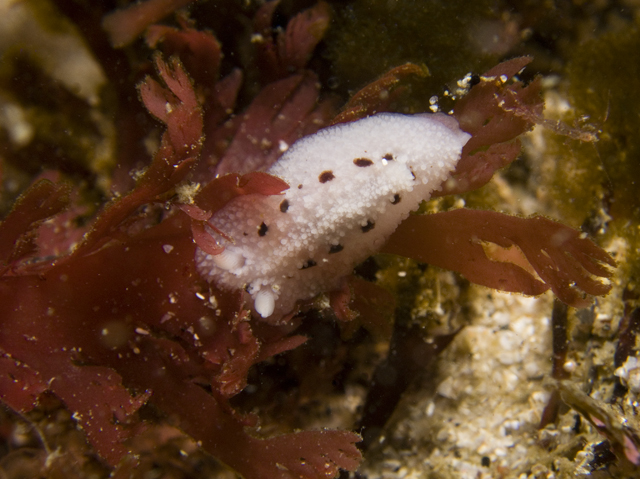
- Atagema rugosa on the Atlantic Coast of the Cape Peninsula, South Africa

Scientific classification
- Kingdom: Animalia
- Phylum: Mollusca
- Class: Gastropoda
- Order: Nudibranchia
- Family: Discodorididae
- Genus: Atagema; Gray, 1850

Type species
- Doris carinata Quoy & Gaimard, 1832

Synonyms
- list: Glossodoridiformia O'Donoghue, 1927; Petelodoris Bergh, 1882; Phlegmodoris Bergh, 1878; Trippa Bergh, 1877; Trippa (Phlegmodoris) Bergh, 1878 junior subjective synonym

= Atagema =

Genus of gastropods

Atagema is a genus of sea slugs, specifically dorid nudibranchs. They are marine gastropod molluscs in the family Discodorididae.

== General characteristics ==
(Original description) The respiratory gills are significantly reduced and positioned at the distal end of the dorsal sac.

== Species ==
Species so far described in this genus include:

- Atagema alba (O'Donoghue, 1927) hunchback doris
- Atagema anceps (Bergh, 1890)
- Atagema boucheti Valdés & Gosliner, 2001
- Atagema browni T. E. Thompson, 1980
- Atagema carinata (Quoy & Gaimard, 1832) - type species
- Atagema echinata (Pease, 1860)
- Atagema gibba Pruvot-Fol, 1951
- Atagema hispida (A. d'Orbigny, 1836)
- Atagema intecta (Kelaart, 1858)
- Atagema kimberlyae Innabi, Stout & Á. Valdés, 2023
- Atagema molesta (M. C. Miller, 1989)
- Atagema notacristata Camacho-Garcia & Gosliner, 2008
- Atagema ornata (Ehrenberg, 1831)
- Atagema osseosa Kelaart, 1858
- Atagema papillosa (Risbec, 1928)
- Atagema rugosa Pruvot-Fol, 1951 rugby-ball dorid, spined dorid
- Atagema scabriuscula (Pease, 1860)
- Atagema sobanovae (Innabi et al., 2023)
- Atagema spinosa (Risbec, 1928)
- Atagema spongiosa (Kelaart, 1858)
- Atagema triphylla (Bergh, 1892)
- Atagema tristis (Alder & Hancock, 1864)

Species inquirenda

- Atagema africana Pruvot-Fol, 1953
- Atagema albata (Burn, 1962)

synonyms

- Atagema paagoumenei (Risbec, 1928): synonym of Atagema spongiosa (Kelaart, 1858) (junior subjective synonym)
- Atagema prea (Ev. Marcus & Er. Marcus, 1967) is a synonym of Sclerodoris prea (Ev. Marcus & Er. Marcus, 1967)
- Atagema quadrimaculata Collier, 1963: synonym of Atagema alba (O'Donoghue, 1927)
