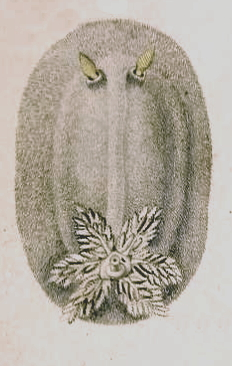
- Atagema hispida (holotype)

Scientific classification
- Kingdom: Animalia
- Phylum: Mollusca
- Class: Gastropoda
- Order: Nudibranchia
- Family: Discodorididae
- Genus: Atagema
- Species: A. hispida

Binomial name
- Atagema hispida (d'Orbigny, 1836)

Synonyms
- Diaulula hispida (A. d'Orbigny, 1836) superseded combination; Doris hispida A. d'Orbigny, 1836 superseded combination

= Atagema hispida =

Species of gastropod

Atagema hispida is a species of sea slug or dorid nudibranch, a marine gastropod mollusk in the family Discodorididae.

== Description ==
(Original description in French) The body is oval and elevated. The mantle is thick, wavy along the edges, and wider than the foot; it is covered on the upper surface by very small, long papillae that are pressed tightly against one another. Each of these papillae is terminated by a large number of villosities forming a brush-like shape. On the median line, there is a raised groove that extends from the tentacles to the gills. The foot is wide and oval, provided with an anterior groove.

The head bears two lateral buccal tentacles which are conical and sharp, and the mouth is surrounded by fleshy ridges. The main tentacles are club-shaped, sharp, and divided into leaflets at their tips; they are contractile into protective cavities, of which the protruding, tube-like orifice is covered with papillae that render the edges ciliated.

The gills are contractile within a posterior cavity of the mantle and are divided into six strongly branched plumes. The anus emerges from a median cavity of the gills, and the excretory orifice is located on the right side, in front of the anus.

In terms of color, the creature is white and slightly purplish.

Its dimensions include a total length of 4 centimeters and a width of 2 to 3 centimeters.

== Distribution ==
This marine species occurs off Argentina, the Falkland Islands, Chile
