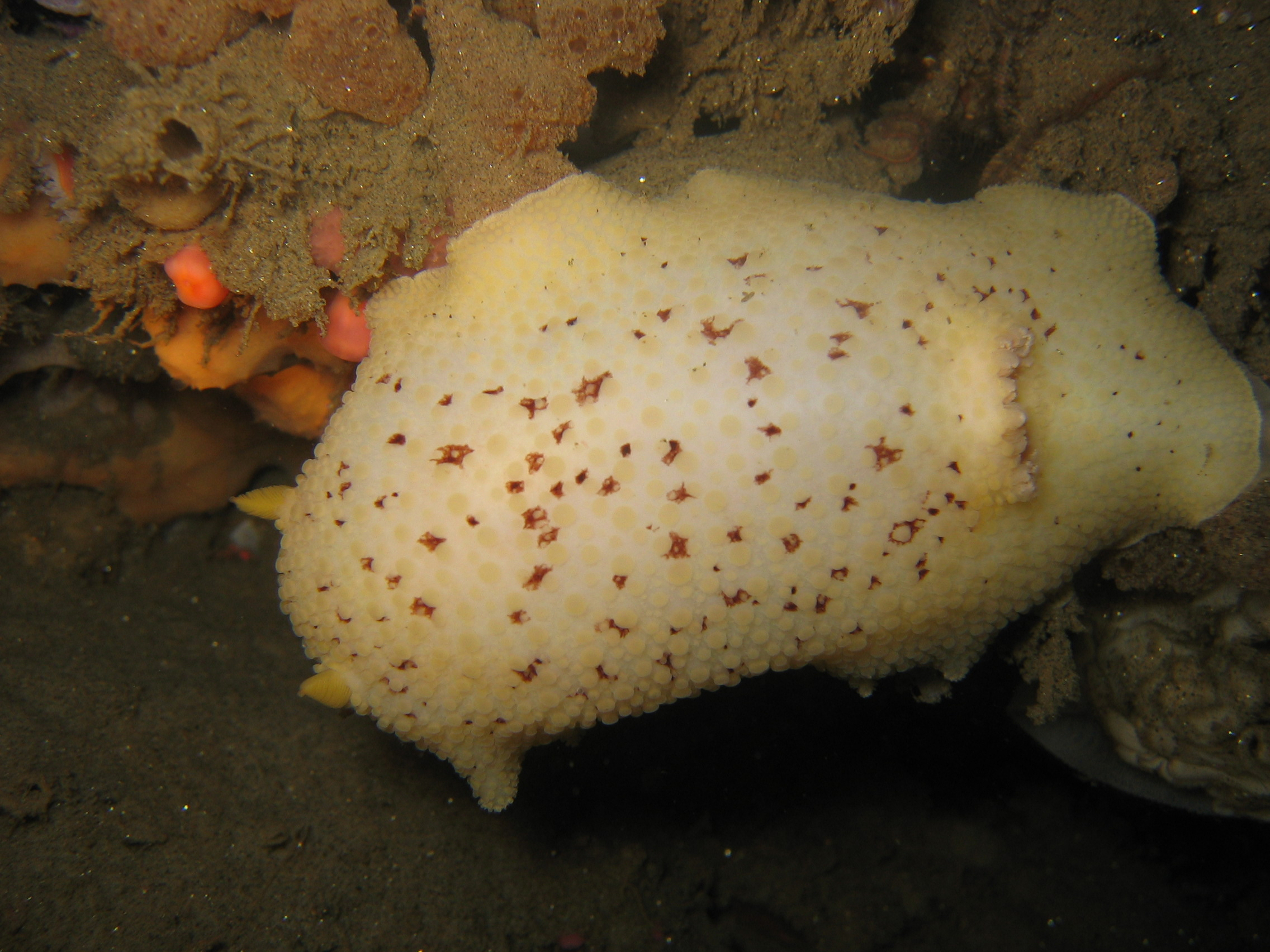

Scientific classification
- Kingdom: Animalia
- Phylum: Mollusca
- Class: Gastropoda
- Order: Nudibranchia
- Family: Discodorididae
- Genus: Peltodoris
- Species: P. nobilis

Binomial name
- Peltodoris nobilis (MacFarland, 1905)

Synonyms
- Montereina nobilis MacFarland, 1905; Anisodoris nobilis (MacFarland, 1905); Diaulula nobilis (MacFarland, 1905)

= Peltodoris nobilis =

Species of gastropod

Peltodoris nobilis, commonly called the sea lemon, false sea lemon, or the noble dorid, is a species of colorful sea slug, a dorid nudibranch, a shell-less marine gastropod mollusk in the family Discodorididae.

This species was previously placed in the genus Anisodoris and was known for a long time as Anisodoris nobilis. Subsequently it was known as Diaulula nobilis.

This animal gives off a pleasant citrus smell when it is handled, and this (along with its yellow coloration) is what is responsible for the common name 'sea lemon'. Its diet includes Mycale adhaerens, the purple scallop sponge.

== Distribution ==
This species occurs in the Eastern Pacific Ocean from Alaska to Baja California. It eats sponges.

== Description ==
This nudibranch is variable in color, from a very pale yellow through a rich yellow, to a rather dark orange. The gill rosette is tinged with white at the tips.

The dorsum is covered in tubercles. There are a number of dark spots on the dorsum, but never on the tubercles themselves. These dark spots vary a lot in number from one individual to the next.

This animal can grow to be as large as 200 mm, or nearly 8 inches in length.

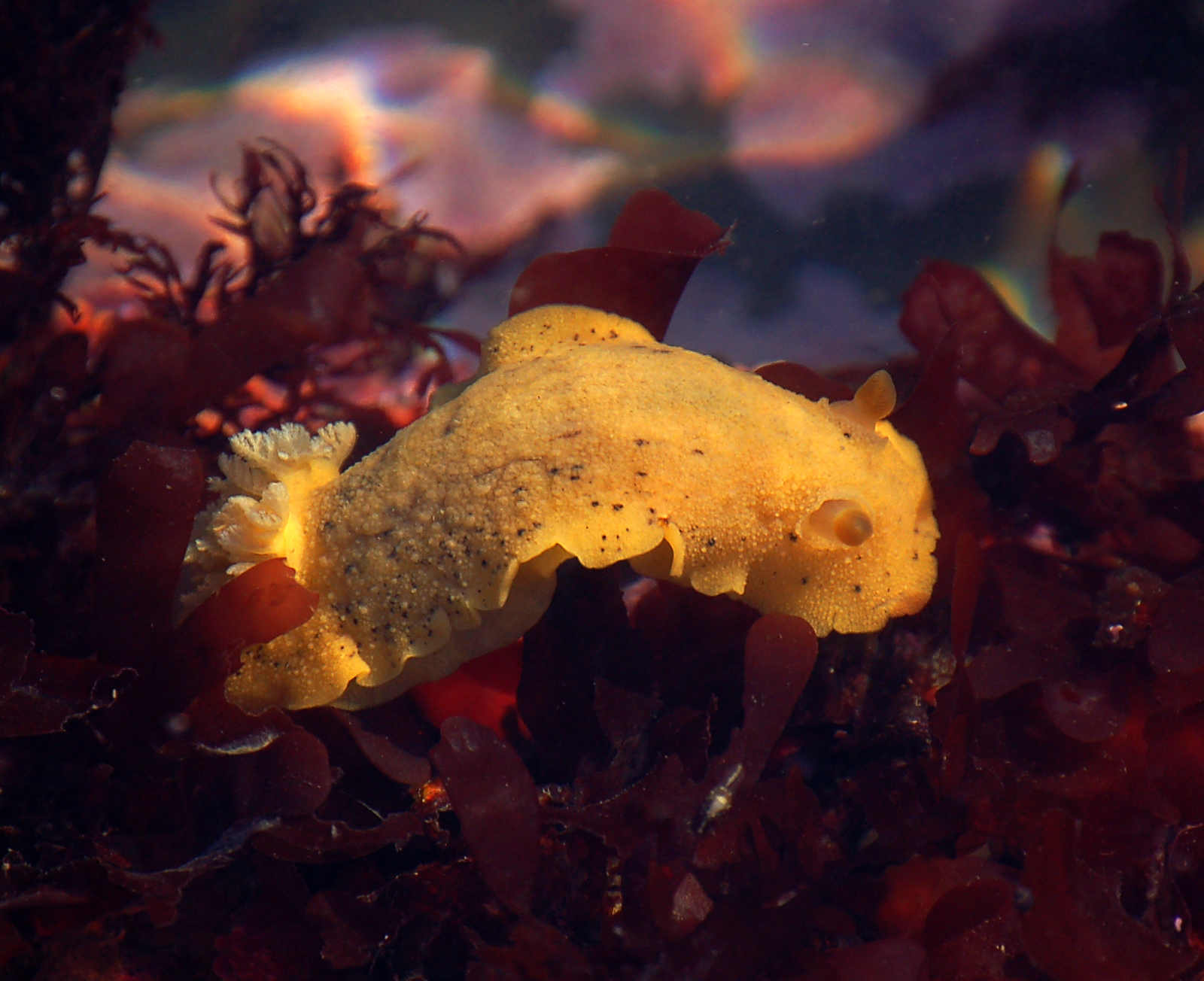
A dark yellow Peltodoris nobilis crawling on red algae

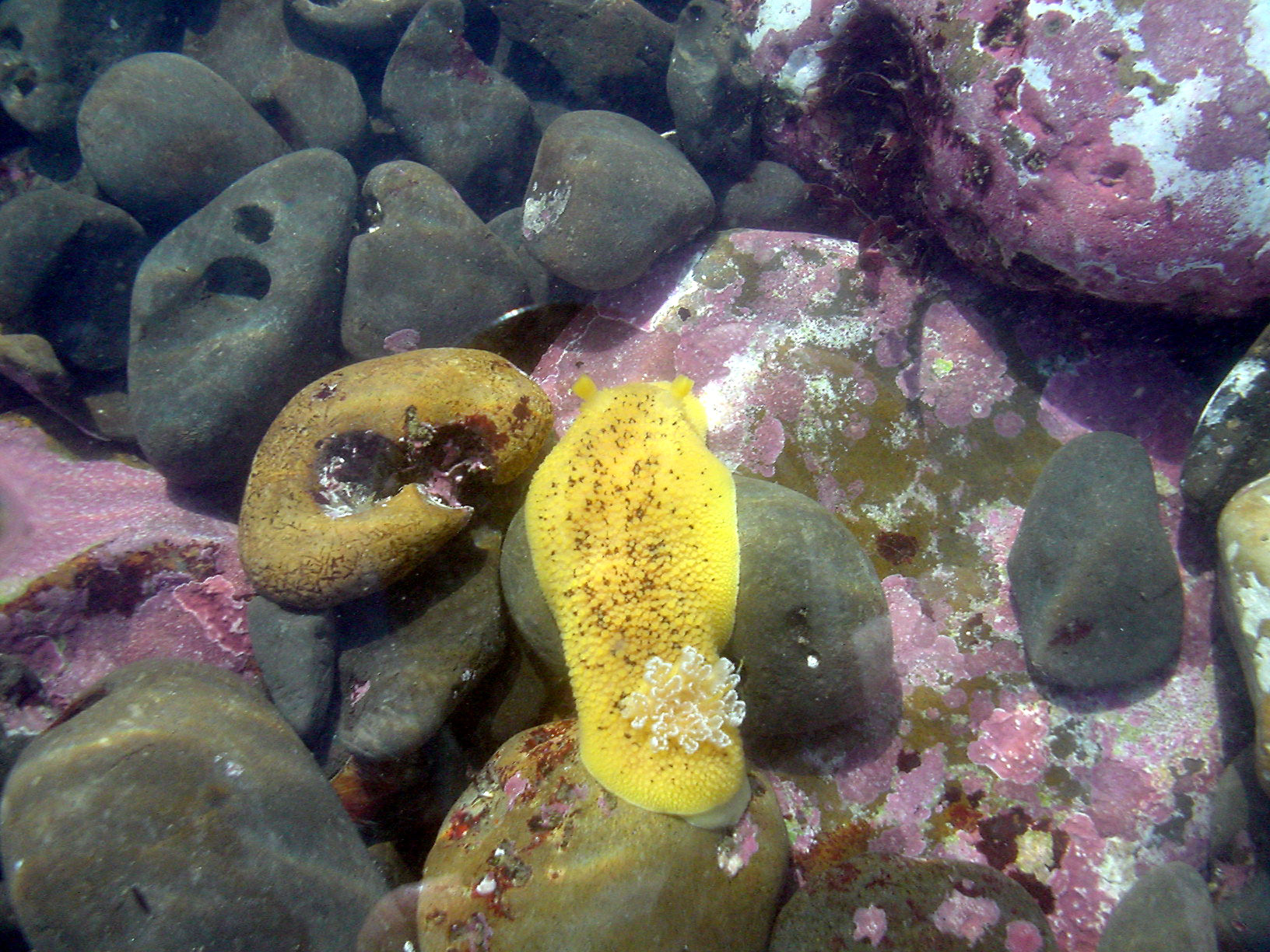
Peltodoris nobilis, Moss Beach, California
