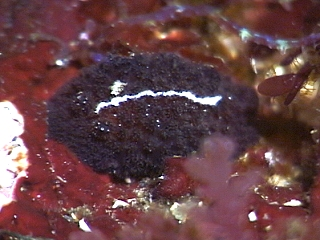

Scientific classification
- Kingdom: Animalia
- Phylum: Mollusca
- Class: Gastropoda
- Order: Nudibranchia
- Family: Discodorididae
- Genus: Atagema
- Species: A. intecta

Binomial name
- Atagema intecta (Kelaart, 1859)

Synonyms
- Doris intecta Kelaart, 1859; Trippa intecta (Kelaart, 1859); Goniodoris erinaceus Crosse in Angas, 1864; Trippa affinis Bergh, 1905; Trippa ornata Bergh, 1905

= Atagema intecta =

Species of gastropod

Atagema intecta is a species of sea slug or dorid nudibranch, a marine gastropod mollusk in the family Discodorididae.

== Description ==
(Original description) The body is one and a quarter inches long (31.75 mm). The mantle is warty and displays a dark brown color, appearing nearly black; along the medial line, there is a thick, white, pasty line. The dorsal tentacles are brown, clavate, and laminated. The oral tentacles are long, linear, and pointed, featuring a bright brown color. There are six branchial plumes which are tripinnated and golden brown in hue. The foot is also golden brown, narrow in shape, and extends longer than the mantle.

== Distribution ==
This species was described from Sri Lanka. It is found in the tropical Indo-West Pacific Ocean.

== Ecology ==
This dorid nudibranch feeds on sponges.
