= Diaulula greeleyi =

Scientific classification
- Kingdom: Animalia
- Phylum: Mollusca
- Class: Gastropoda
- Order: Nudibranchia
- Family: Discodorididae
- Genus: Diaulula
- Species: D. greeleyi

Binomial name
- Diaulula greeleyi (MacFarland, 1909)

Synonyms
- Peltodoris greeleyi MacFarland, 1909 "Montereina" greeleyi (MacFarland, 1909)

Species of gastropod

Diaulula greeleyi is a species of sea slug or dorid nudibranch, a marine gastropod mollusc in the family Discodorididae.

== Distribution ==
Distribution of Diaulula greeleyi include Rio de Janeiro State, southeastern Brazil.

== Description ==
The maximum recorded body length is 47 mm.

== Ecology ==
Minimum recorded depth is 0 m. Maximum recorded depth is 2 m.

Prey of Diaulula greeleyi include sponges Lissondendoryx isodictialis and Haliclona sp.
