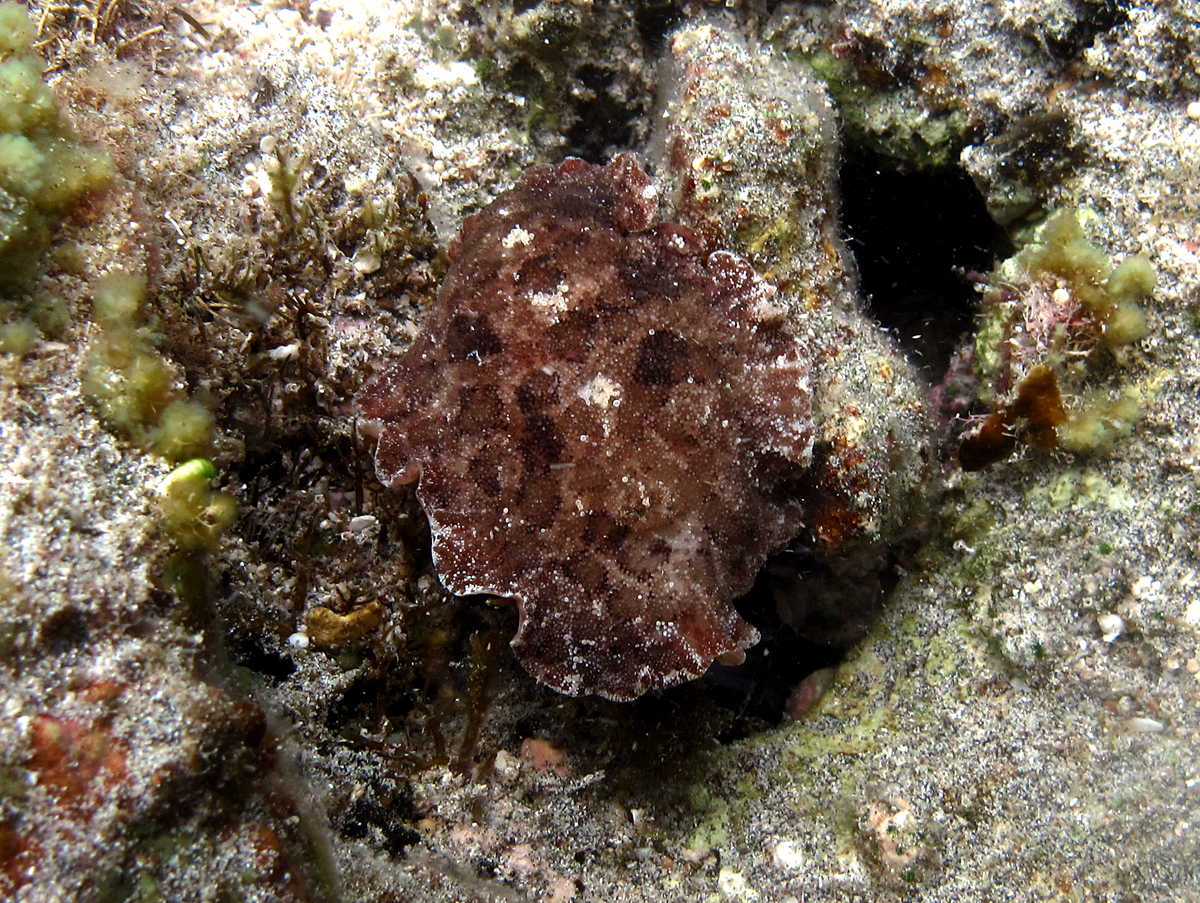

Scientific classification
- Kingdom: Animalia
- Phylum: Mollusca
- Class: Gastropoda
- Order: Nudibranchia
- Family: Discodorididae
- Genus: Tayuva
- Species: T. lilacina

Binomial name
- Tayuva lilacina (Gould, 1852)

Synonyms
- Chromodoris lilacina (Gould, 1852); Diaulula hummelincki (Ev. Marcus & Er. Marcus, 1963); Discodoris confusa Ballesteros, Llera & Ortea, 1985; Discodoris hummelincki (Ev. Marcus & Er. Marcus, 1963); Discodoris ketos (Ev. Marcus & Er. Marcus, 1967); Discodoris ketos gila (Er. Marcus & Ev. Marcus, 1970); Discodoris ketos ketos (Ev. Marcus & Er. Marcus, 1967); Discodoris lilacina (Gould, 1852); Discodoris maculosa Bergh, 1884; Discodoris palma Allan, 1933; Doris lilacina Gould, 1852 (basionym); Peltodoris crucis (Mörch, 1863) sensu Bergh, 1880 (misidentification); Peltodoris hummelincki Marcus & Marcus, 1963; Tayuva ketos Marcus & Marcus, 1967; Tayuva ketos gila Marcus & Marcus, 1970; Tayuva ketos juva Marcus & Marcus, 1970; Tayuva ketos ketos Marcus & Marcus, 1967

= Tayuva lilacina =

Species of gastropod

Tayuva lilacina is a species of sea slug, a dorid nudibranch, shell-less marine gastropod mollusks in the family Discodorididae. A number of species descriptions are considered to be synonyms.

== Distribution ==
This species was described from Honolulu, Oahu, Sandwich Islands. It has been reported widely in the Indo-Central Pacific and from the Pacific coast of Mexico and the Canary Islands. This wide distribution suggests that it is probably a species complex, but it has been considered to be an invasive species.

== Description ==
The maximum recorded body length is 50 mm or up to 120 mm.

== Ecology ==
Minimum recorded depth is 0.5 m. Maximum recorded depth is 63 m.

Tayuva lilacina feeds on Haliclona caerulea according to the in situ observations on the Pacific coast of Mexico. It is probably highly specialized on this sponge.
