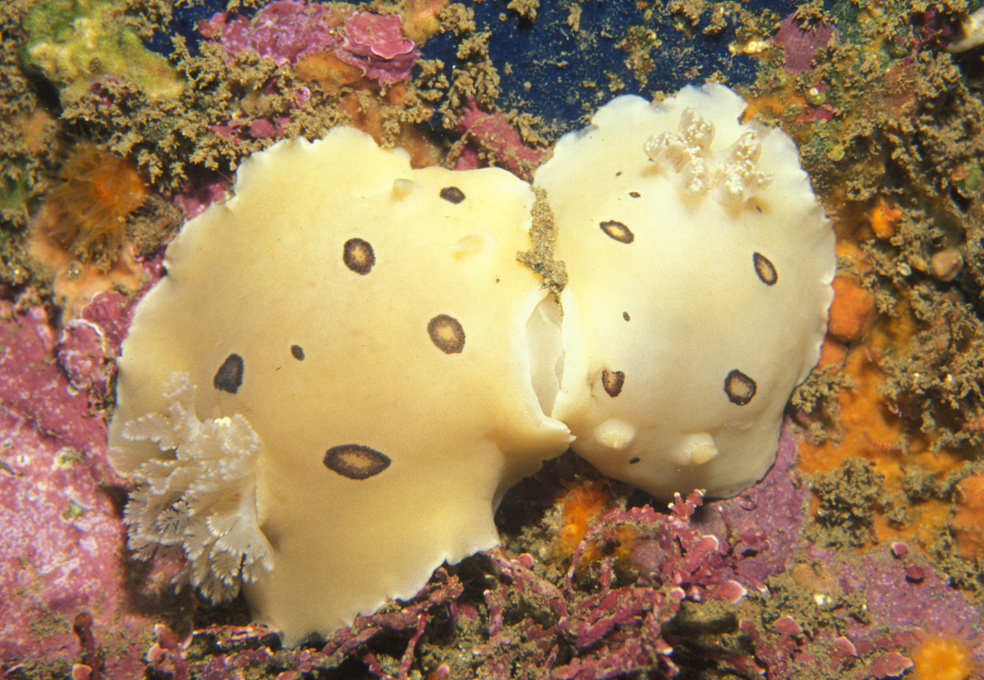
- A pair of Diaulula sandiegensis mating

Scientific classification
- Kingdom: Animalia
- Phylum: Mollusca
- Class: Gastropoda
- Order: Nudibranchia
- Family: Discodorididae
- Genus: Diaulula
- Species: D. sandiegensis

Binomial name
- Diaulula sandiegensis (Cooper, 1862)

= Diaulula sandiegensis =

Species of gastropod

Diaulula sandiegensis, commonly known as the San Diego dorid or the ringed dorid, is a species of sea slug or nudibranch, a marine gastropod mollusc in the suborder Doridina and the family Discodorididae.

The specific epithet sandiegensis means "of San Diego", referring to the Southern California city.

== Distribution ==
Though both its common and scientific names refer to San Diego, Diaulula sandiegensis occurs along the coast of the northeastern Pacific, from Alaska to Puerto Penasco, Mexico. This dorid nudibranch inhabits the intertidal zone from depths of 0-35 m (115 ft), in both sandy and rocky habitats.

== Description ==
Diaulula sandiegensis grows from 5 to 10 cm (2-5 in) in length. This nudibranch ranges in color from white to golden-yellow or light brown, and has characteristic markings consisting of sparse, irregularly scattered dark brown rings and spots on the mantle. It is likely that these spots are the beginning stage of the rings. Their mantle has a velvety appearance, created by minute spiculate papillae (caryophillidia); these sensory nodules are typical of dorid nudibranchs.

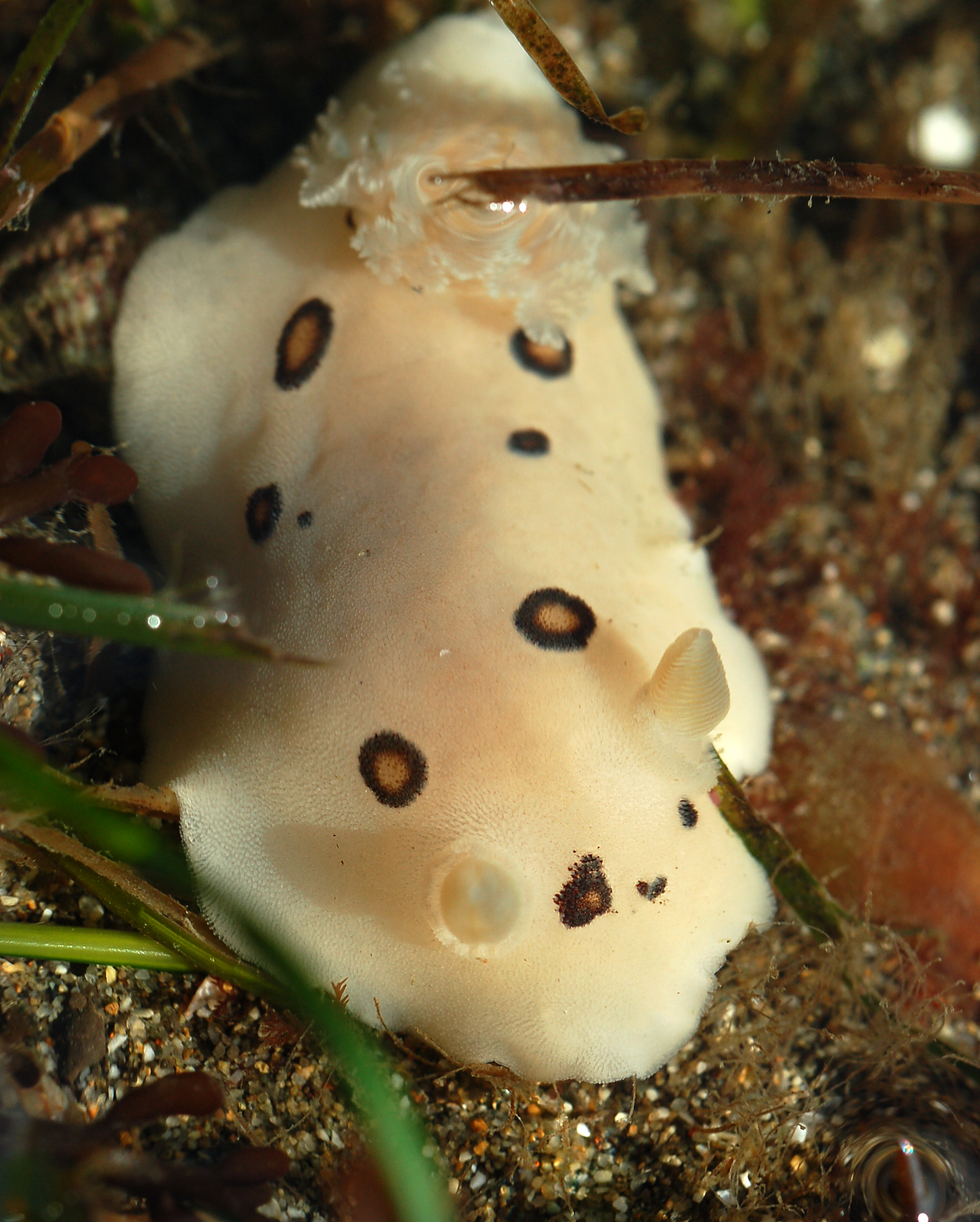
Diaulula sandiegensis

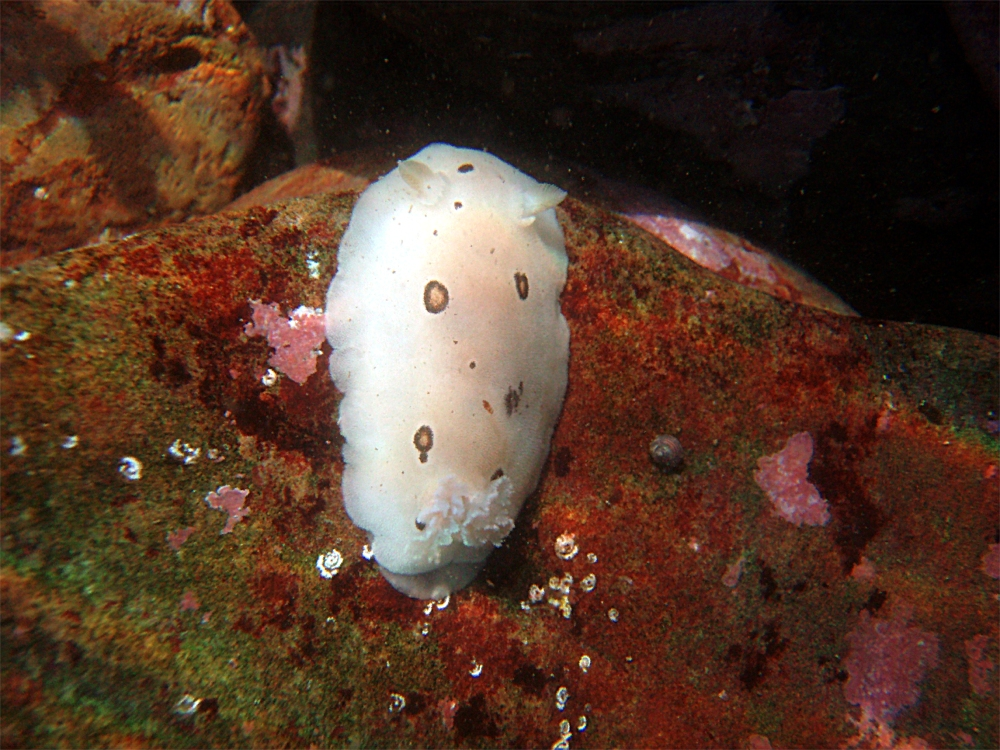
In a central California tidepool

== Ecology ==
=== Diet ===
Like many dorids, this species feeds on sponges; in this case, species of the genera Halichondria, Haliclona, Myxilla, and Petrosia.

=== Growth and reproduction ===
Like all nudibranchs, Diaulula sandiegensis is a simultaneous hermaphrodite. While mating, individuals wrestle for dominance, attempting to penetrate and impregnate the other by darting their penises into their body wall. The egg ribbon is narrow, white, and attached in an oval spiral on a rock substrate. Eggs develop and hatch into planktonic veliger larvae. After undergoing metamorphosis, Diaulula sandiegensis will spend its life in the benthic zone, using specially developed pedal ganglia in their foot to assist in movement like many other bottom-dwelling nudibranchs. These ganglia work by producing peptides which elicit an increase in the rate at which the cilia on the underside of the foot beat, resulting in crawling.
