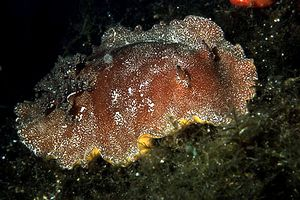
- Platydoris argo

Scientific classification
- Kingdom: Animalia
- Phylum: Mollusca
- Class: Gastropoda
- Order: Nudibranchia
- Family: Discodorididae
- Genus: Platydoris; Bergh, 1877

Type species
- Doris argo Linnaeus, 1767

= Platydoris =

Genus of gastropods

Platydoris is a genus of sea slugs, dorid nudibranchs, shell-less marine gastropod mollusks in the family Discodorididae. These nudibranchs are large and often brightly coloured, but normally live concealed beneath rocks or loose coral, feeding on sponges. During the night they become more active, searching for new food sources or mates. Many species were described in the 19th century and a revision in 2002 added six new species.

== Species ==
Species in the genus Platydoris include:

- Platydoris angustipes (Mörch, 1863)
- Platydoris annulata Dorgan, Valdes & Gosliner, 2002
- Platydoris argo (Linnaeus, 1767) - type species of the genus Platydoris
- Platydoris carinata Risbec, 1928
- Platydoris carolynae Mulliner & Sphon, 1974
- Platydoris cinereobranchiata Dorgan, Valdes & Gosliner, 2002
- Platydoris cruenta (Quoy & Gaimard, 1832)
- Platydoris dierythros Fahey & Valdés, 2003
- Platydoris ellioti (Alder & Hancock, 1864)
- Platydoris esakii (Baba, 1936)
- Platydoris formosa (Alder & Hancock, 1864)
- Platydoris galbana Burn, 1958
- Platydoris guarani Lima & Simone, 2018
- Platydoris inframaculata (Abraham, 1877)
- Platydoris inornata Dorgan, Valdes & Gosliner, 2002
- Platydoris macfarlandi Hanna, 1951
- Platydoris ocellata Dorgan, Valdés & Gosliner, 2002
- Platydoris pulchra Eliot, 1904
- Platydoris rolani Dorgan, Valdés & Gosliner, 2002
- Platydoris sabulosa Dorgan, Valdés & Gosliner, 2002
- Platydoris sanguinea Bergh, 1905
- Platydoris scabra (Cuvier, 1804)
- Platydoris spongilla Risbec, 1928
- Platydoris striata (Kelaart, 1858)
- Platydoris tabulata Abraham, 1877 - nomen dubium
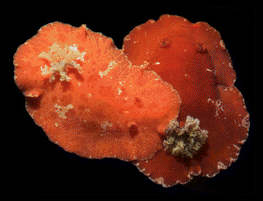
Platydoris angustipes

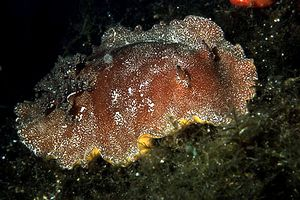
Platydoris argo

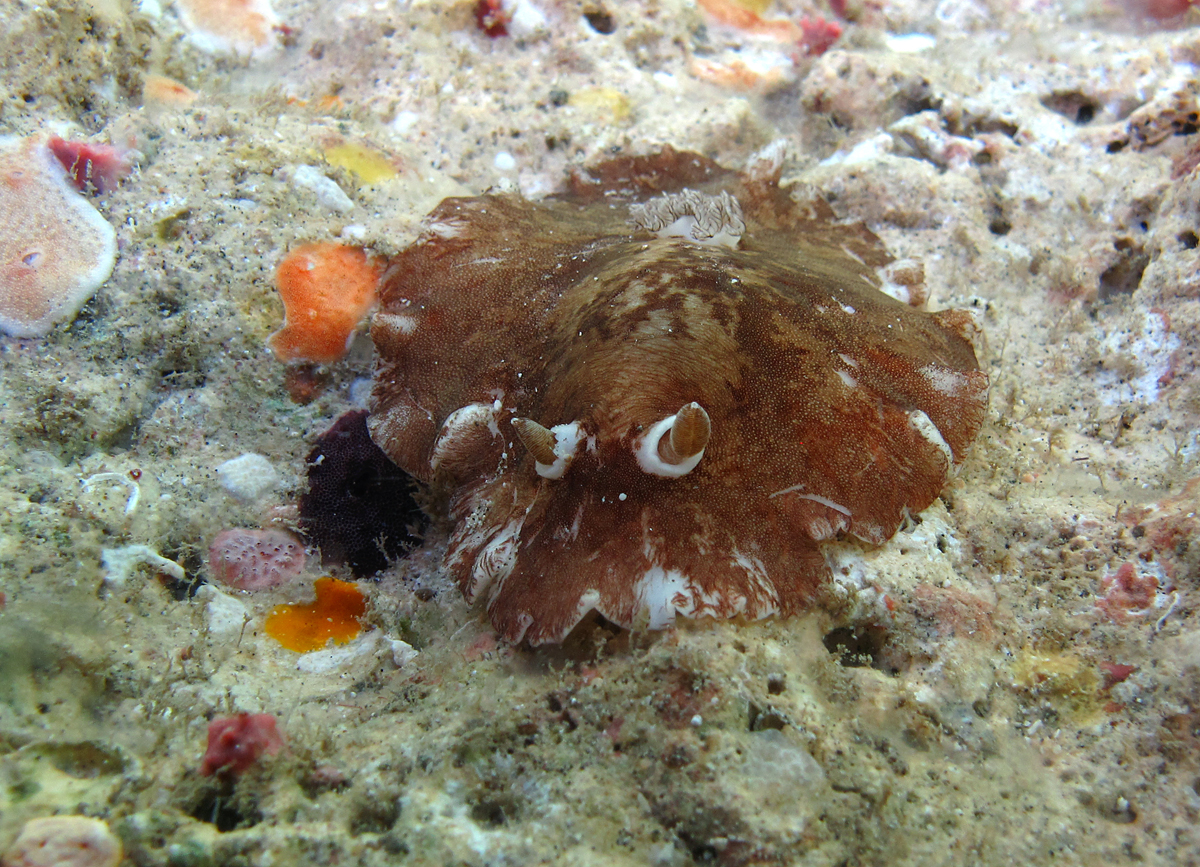
Platydoris cruenta

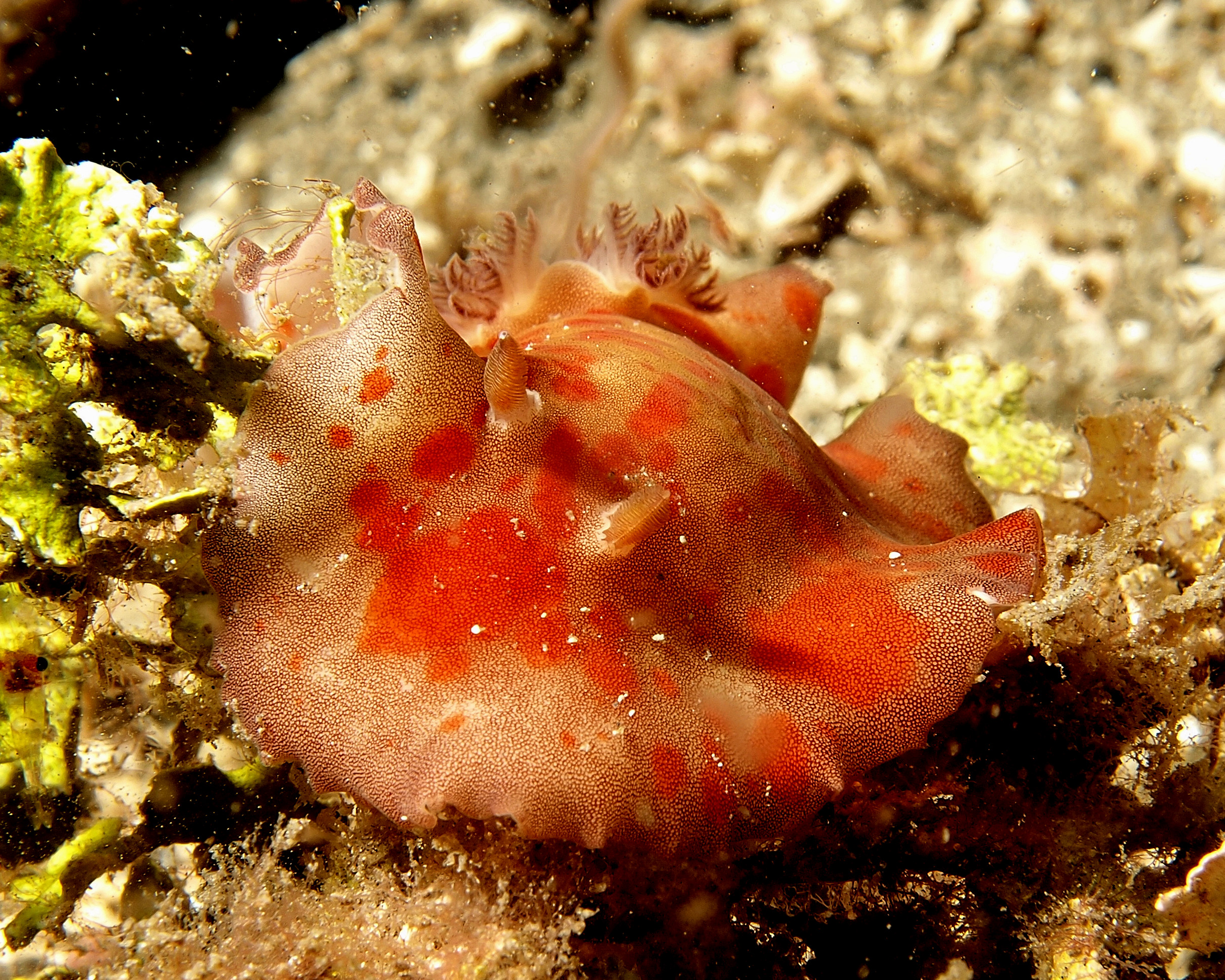
Platydoris cinereobranchiata

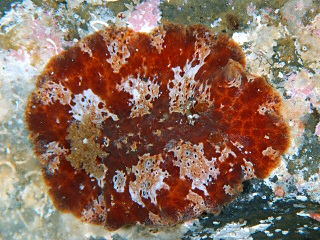
Platydoris ellioti

Species brought into synonymy

- Platydoris arrogans Bergh, 1877: synonym of Platydoris cruenta (Quoy & Gaimard, 1832)
- Platydoris dura Pruvot-Fol, 1951: synonym of Platydoris argo (Linnaeus, 1767)
- Platydoris eurychlamys Bergh, 1877: synonym of Platydoris scabra (Cuvier, 1804)
- Platydoris flammulata Bergh, 1905: synonym of Platydoris angustipes (Mörch, 1863)
- Platydoris immonda Risbec, 1928: synonym of Doris immonda Risbec, 1928
- Platydoris incerta Eliot, 1904: synonym of Platydoris pulchra Eliot, 1904
- Platydoris laminea Risbec, 1928: synonym of Discodoris laminea (Risbec, 1928)
- Platydoris maculata Bouchet, 1977 : synonym of Baptodoris cinnabarina Bergh, 1884
- Platydoris noumeae Risbec, 1928: synonym of Platydoris scabra (Cuvier, 1804)
- Platydoris papillata Eliot, 1903: synonym of Asteronotus raripilosus (Abraham, 1877)
- Platydoris peruviana (d'Orbigny, 1837) synonym of Baptodoris peruviana (d'Orbigny, 1837)
- Platydoris philippi Bergh, 1877: synonym of Platydoris argo (Linnaeus, 1767)
- Platydoris punctatella Bergh, 1898: synonym of Baptodoris peruviana (d'Orbigny, 1837)
- Platydoris rubra White, 1952: synonym of Platydoris angustipes (Mörch, 1863)
- Platydoris stomascuta Bouchet, 1977: synonym of Baptodoris stomascuta (Bouchet, 1977)
