= Gargamella blokoverdensis =

Scientific classification
- Domain: Eukaryota
- Kingdom: Animalia
- Phylum: Mollusca
- Class: Gastropoda
- Order: Nudibranchia
- Family: Discodorididae
- Genus: Gargamella
- Species: G. blokoverdensis

Binomial name
- Gargamella blokoverdensis Moro & Ortea, 2015

Species of gastropod

Gargamella blokoverdensis is a species of sea slug, a dorid nudibranch, shell-less marine opisthobranch gastropod mollusks in the family Discodorididae.

== Distribution ==
This species was described from the Parda reef, Sal island, Cape Verde. The specimens were found in the intertidal zone or up to 1 m depth.

== Description ==
Gargamella blokoverdensis is a small dorid nudibranch, growing to 16 mm in length. It is orange in colour with spots of brown.
