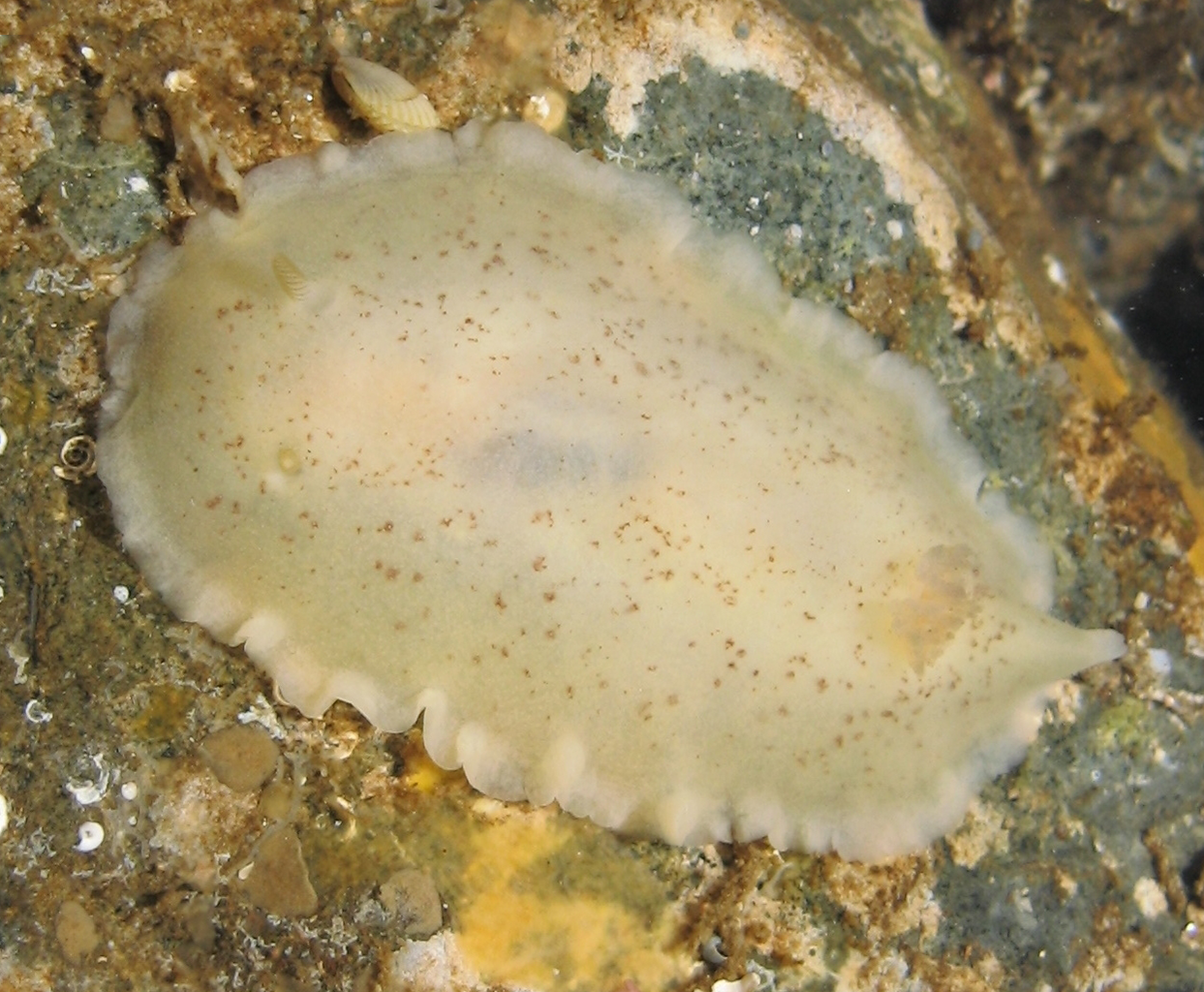
- Baptodoris peruviana

Scientific classification
- Kingdom: Animalia
- Phylum: Mollusca
- Class: Gastropoda
- Order: Nudibranchia
- Family: Discodorididae
- Genus: Baptodoris; Bergh, 1884

Type species
- Baptodoris cinnabarina Bergh, 1884 (type by monotypy)

= Baptodoris =

Genus of gastropods

Baptodoris is a genus of sea slugs, dorid nudibranchs, shell-less marine gastropod mollusks in the family Discodorididae.

The genus Baptodoris was originally classified by Bergh in 1891 in the subfamily Platydorididae (despite the use of suffix -idea), a subfamily of the family Dorididae. In 1934 Alice Pruvot-Fol elevated this subfamily to its new status as family Platydorididae. In 2002 Valdés has given the name Discodorididae precedence over the name Platydorididae.

The Sea Slug Forum however classifies this genus in the family Dorididae.

== Species ==
Species in the genus Baptodoris include:

- Baptodoris cinnabarina Bergh, 1884 (junior synonym Platydoris maculata Bouchet, 1977 ) - type species of the genus
- Baptodoris mimetica Gosliner, 1991
- Baptodoris peruviana (d'Orbigny, 1837)
- Baptodoris phinei Valdés, 2001
- Baptodoris stomascuta (Bouchet, 1977) (originally Platydoris stomascuta Bouchet, 1977 )

Taxon inquirendum

- Baptodoris fongosa Risbec, 1928

Species brought into synonymy

- Baptodoris perezi Llera & Ortea, 1982: synonym of Gargamella perezi (Llera & Ortea, 1982)
