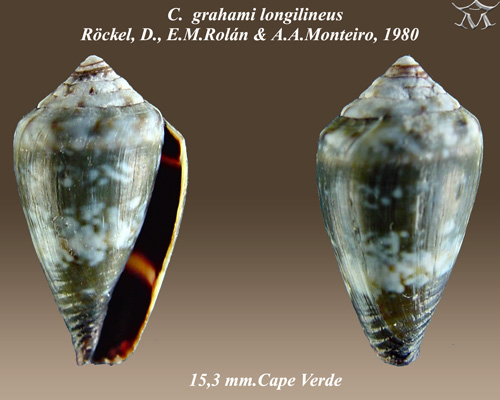
- Two views of a shell of Conus longilineus

Conservation status
- Least Concern (IUCN 3.1)

Scientific classification
- Kingdom: Animalia
- Phylum: Mollusca
- Class: Gastropoda
- Subclass: Caenogastropoda
- Order: Neogastropoda
- Superfamily: Conoidea
- Family: Conidae
- Genus: Conus
- Species: C. longilineus

Binomial name
- Conus longilineus Röckel, Rolán & Monteiro, 1980

Synonyms
- Africonus cagarralensis Cossignani, 2014; Africonus longilineus (Röckel, Rolán & Monteiro, 1980); Africonus melissae (Tenorio, Afonso & Rolán, 2008); Africonus minimus Cossignani & Fiadeiro, 2015; Africonus nelsonandradoi Cossignani & Fiadeiro, 2015; Conus (Lautoconus) cagarralensis (Cossignani, 2014); Conus (Lautoconus) longilineus Röckel, Rolán & Monteiro, 1980; Conus (Lautoconus) melissae Tenorio, Afonso & Rolán, 2008; Conus (Lautoconus) nelsonandradoi (Cossignani & Fiadeiro, 2015); Conus cagarralensis (Cossignani, 2014); Conus grahami longilineus Röckel, Rolán & Monteiro, 1980 (basionym); Conus melissae Tenorio, Afonso & Rolán, 2008

= Conus longilineus =

Species of sea snail

Conus longilineus is a species of sea snail, a marine gastropod mollusk in the family Conidae, the cone snails and their allies.

Like all species within the genus Conus, these snails are predatory and venomous. They are capable of stinging humans, therefore live ones should be handled carefully or not at all.

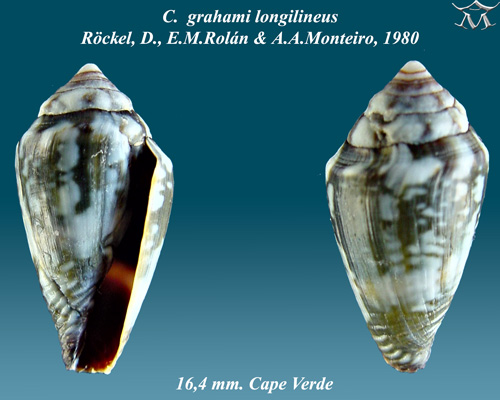
Two views of a shell of Conus longilineus

== Description ==
The shell attains a length of 20 mm.

== Distribution ==
This marine species occurs in the Atlantic Ocean off the Cape Verdes in the following locations in the southern part of the island of Sal:

- Parda
- Sal Island
- Santa Maria
- Serra Negra
