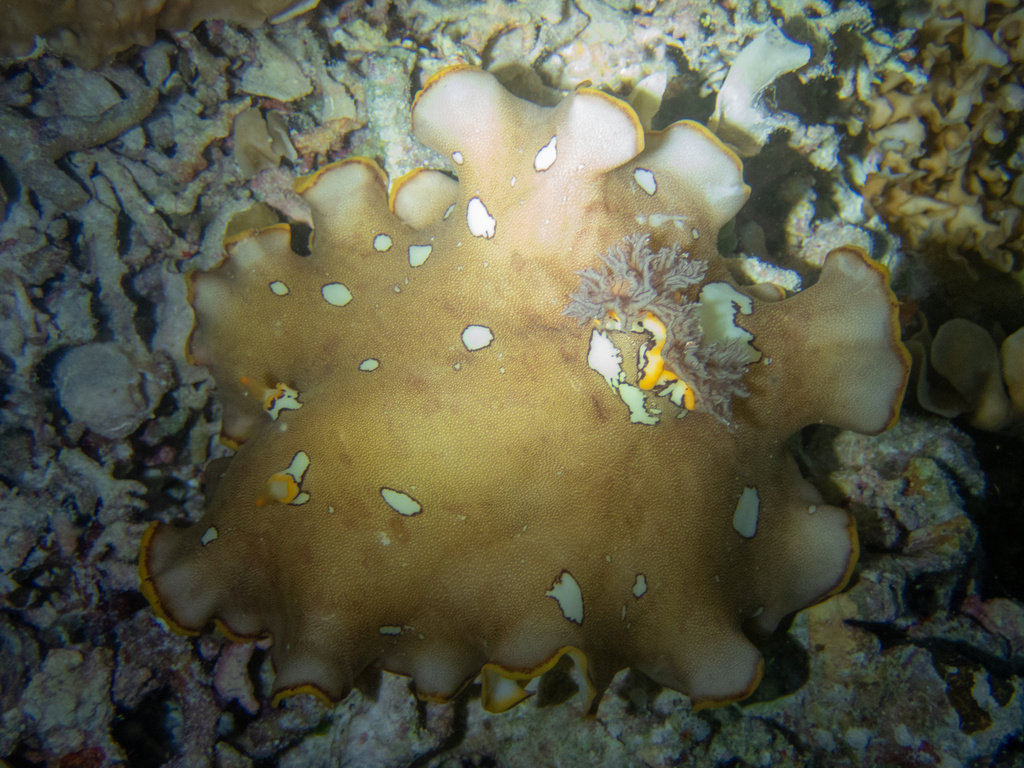

Scientific classification
- Kingdom: Animalia
- Phylum: Mollusca
- Class: Gastropoda
- Order: Nudibranchia
- Family: Discodorididae
- Genus: Platydoris
- Species: P. ocellata

Binomial name
- Platydoris ocellata Dorgan, Valdés & Gosliner, 2002

= Platydoris ocellata =

Species of gastropod

Platydoris ocellata is a species of sea slug, a dorid nudibranch, shell-less marine opisthobranch gastropod mollusks in the family Discodorididae.

== Distribution ==
This species was described from North Moa Island, Indonesia. It is reported from Papua New Guinea, the Philippines, Sulawesi and the Solomon Islands.
