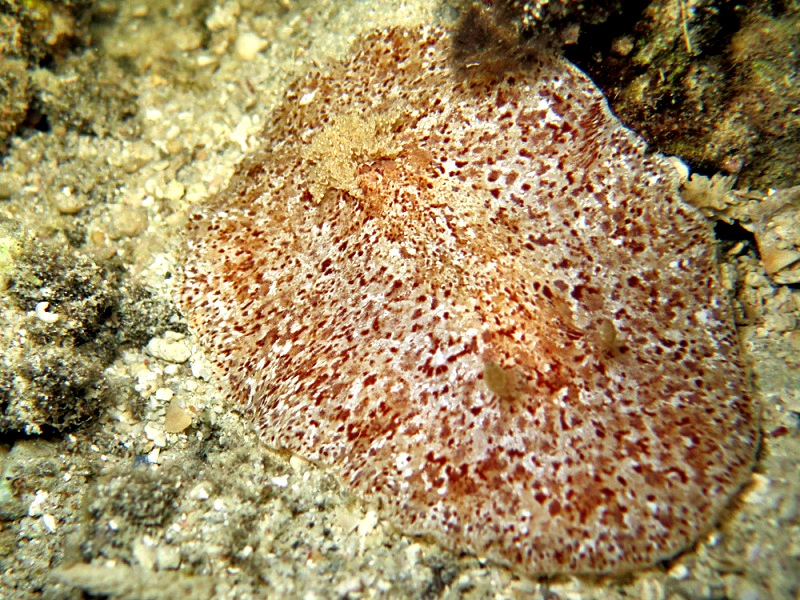
- Lizard Island, Queensland, Australia

Scientific classification
- Kingdom: Animalia
- Phylum: Mollusca
- Class: Gastropoda
- Order: Nudibranchia
- Family: Discodorididae
- Genus: Platydoris
- Species: P. sabulosa

Binomial name
- Platydoris sabulosa Dorgan, Valdés & Gosliner, 2002

= Platydoris sabulosa =

Species of gastropod

Platydoris sabulosa is a species of sea slug, a dorid nudibranch, shell-less marine opisthobranch gastropod mollusks in the family Discodorididae.

== Distribution ==
This species was described from Sumilon Island, Oslob, Cebu, Philippines, 9.4346°N 123.3897°E. It has been reported from southeast Queensland, Australia.
