= Platydoris striata =

Scientific classification
- Domain: Eukaryota
- Kingdom: Animalia
- Phylum: Mollusca
- Class: Gastropoda
- Order: Nudibranchia
- Family: Discodorididae
- Genus: Platydoris
- Species: P. striata

Binomial name
- Platydoris striata (Kelaart, 1858)

Synonyms
- Doris striata Kelaart, 1858)

Species of sea slug

Platydoris striata is a species of sea slug, a dorid nudibranch, shell-less marine opisthobranch gastropod mollusks in the family Discodorididae.

== Distribution ==
This species was described from Sri Lanka (Ceylon). It is reported from the Red Sea and the Indian Ocean.
