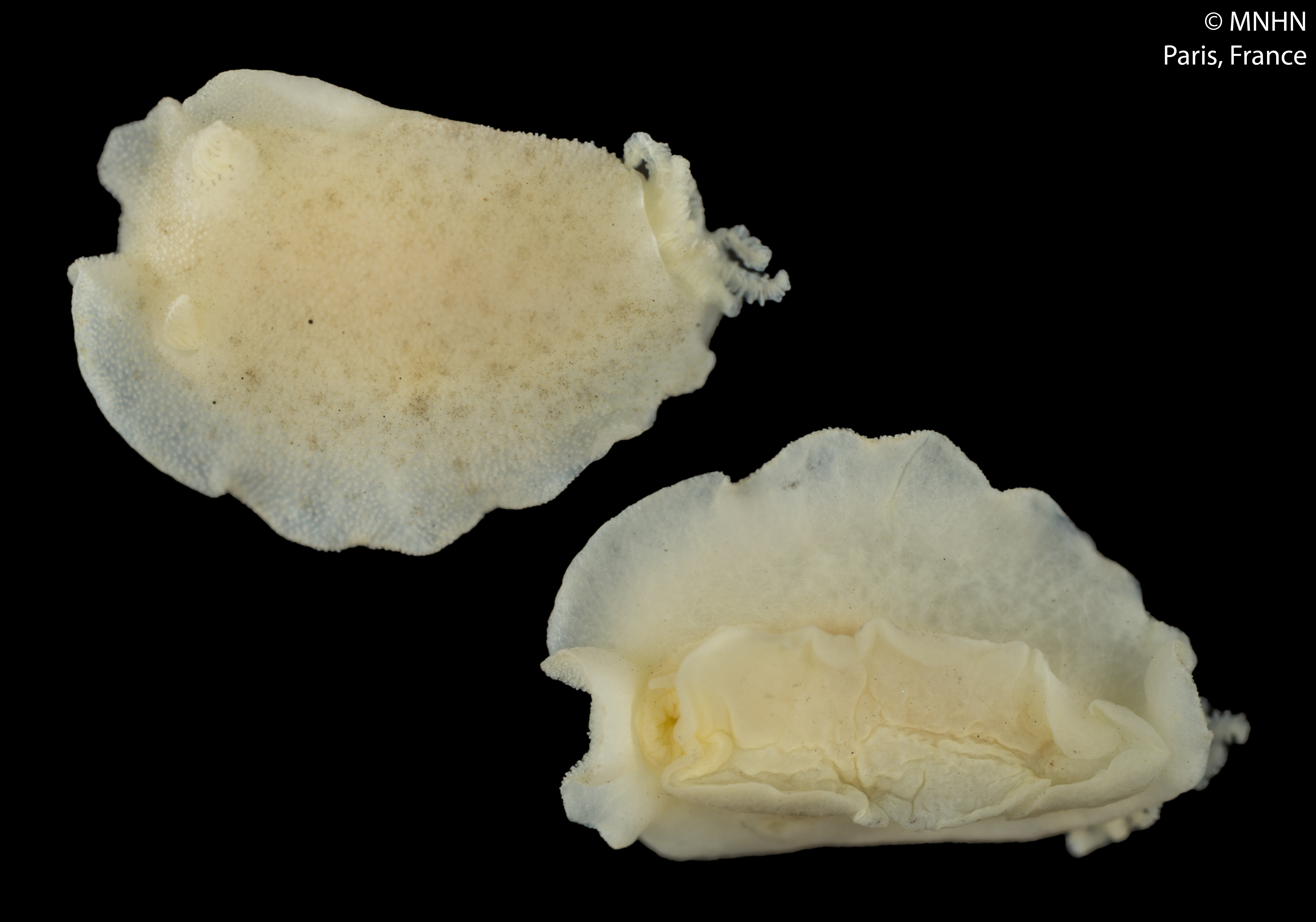
- Gargamella perezi

Scientific classification
- Kingdom: Animalia
- Phylum: Mollusca
- Class: Gastropoda
- Order: Nudibranchia
- Infraorder: Doridoidei
- Superfamily: Doridoidea
- Family: Discodorididae
- Genus: Gargamella (Bergh, 1894)

Synonyms
- Gargamella (Canadoris) Ortea, Moro & Bacallado, 2006

= Gargamella =

Genus of gastropods

Gargamella is a genus of sea slugs, dorid nudibranchs, shell-less marine gastropod molluscs in the family Discodorididae.

== Species ==
Species in the genus Gargamella include:

- Gargamella blokoverdensis Moro & Ortea, 2015
- Gargamella bovina Garavoy, Valdes & Gosliner, 1999
- Gargamella gravastella Garavoy, Valdes & Gosliner, 1999
- Gargamella immaculata Bergh, 1894. Synonym: Gargamella latior Odhner, 1926
- Gargamella lemchei (Ev. Marcus, 1976)
- Gargamella perezi (Llera & Ortea, 1982)
- Gargamella sp. 1, ocellate dorid
- Gargamella wareni Valdes & Gosliner, 2001

== Synonyms ==
- Gargamella latior Odhner, 1926: synonym of Gargamella immaculata Bergh, 1894
- Gargamella novozealandica Eliot, 1907 is a synonym of Jorunna pantherina
