= Platydoris esakii =

Scientific classification
- Kingdom: Animalia
- Phylum: Mollusca
- Class: Gastropoda
- Order: Nudibranchia
- Family: Discodorididae
- Genus: Platydoris
- Species: P. esakii

Binomial name
- Platydoris esakii (Baba, 1936)

Synonyms
- Argus esakii Baba, 1936

Species of gastropod

Platydoris esakii is a species of sea slug, a dorid nudibranch, shell-less marine opisthobranch gastropod mollusks in the family Discodorididae.

== Distribution ==
The holotype for this species was collected at Ishigaki Island, Yaeyama Islands, Ryukyu Islands, Japan.
