= Platydoris inornata =

Scientific classification
- Kingdom: Animalia
- Phylum: Mollusca
- Class: Gastropoda
- Order: Nudibranchia
- Family: Discodorididae
- Genus: Platydoris
- Species: P. inornata

Binomial name
- Platydoris inornata Dorgan, Valdés & Gosliner, 2002

Species of gastropod

Platydoris inornata is a species of sea slug, a dorid nudibranch, shell-less marine opisthobranch gastropod mollusks in the family Discodorididae.

== Distribution ==
The holotype of this species was collected at the Pinnacle, between Tab Island and Rasch Pass, Madang, New Guinea, 5.1618°S 145.8366°E. Further specimens from Madang, New Guinea and Sumilon Island and Maricaban Island, Philippines were included in the original description.
