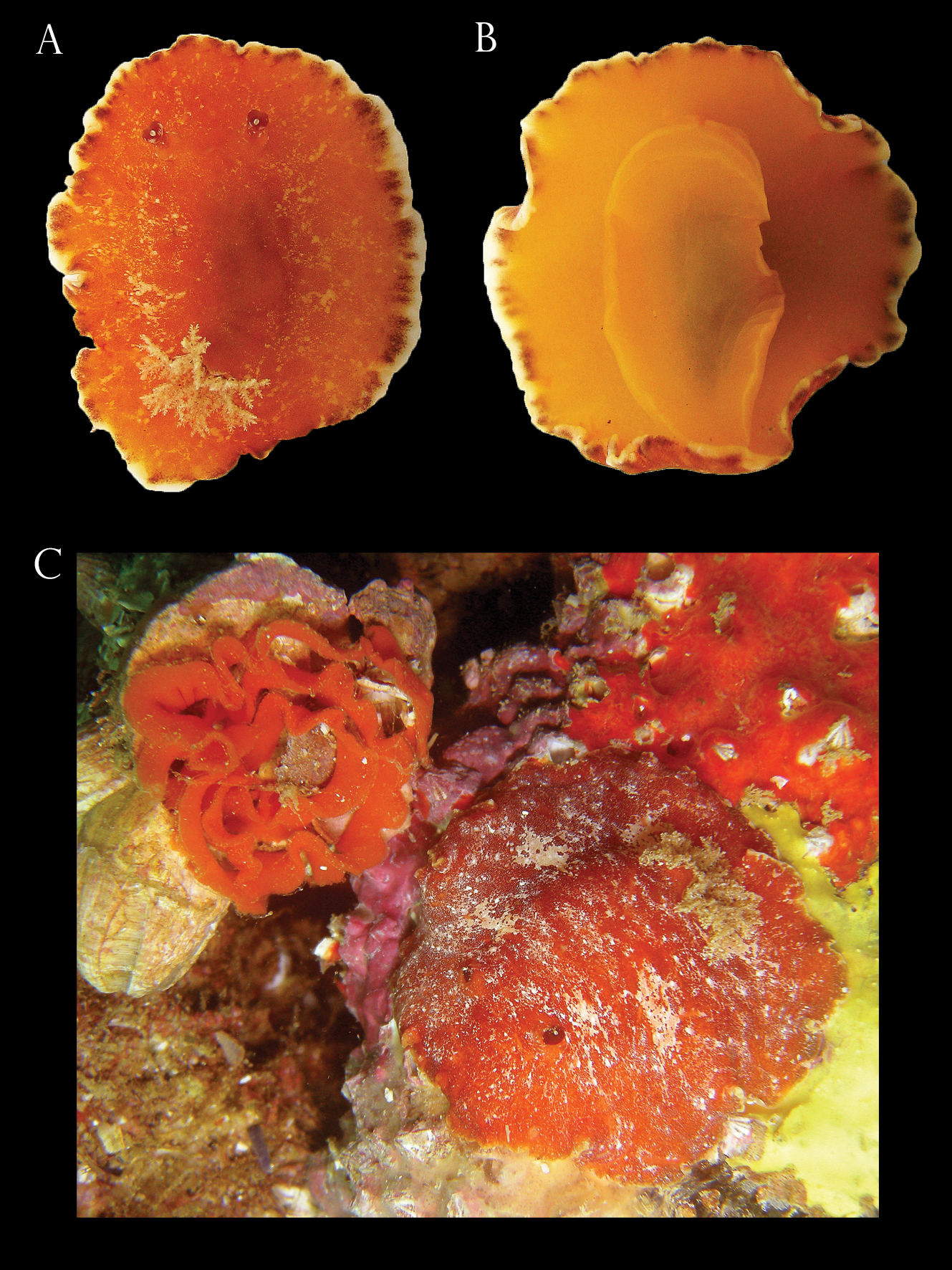
- Platydoris guarani

Scientific classification
- Kingdom: Animalia
- Phylum: Mollusca
- Class: Gastropoda
- Order: Nudibranchia
- Family: Discodorididae
- Genus: Platydoris
- Species: P. guarani

Binomial name
- Platydoris guarani Lima & Simone, 2018

= Platydoris guarani =

Species of sea slug

Platydoris guarani is a species of sea slug, a dorid nudibranch, shell-less marine opisthobranch gastropod mollusks in the family Discodorididae.

== Distribution ==
The distribution of Platydoris guarani ranges from northeastern to southeastern Brazil.
