= Platydoris galbana =

Scientific classification
- Kingdom: Animalia
- Phylum: Mollusca
- Class: Gastropoda
- Order: Nudibranchia
- Family: Discodorididae
- Genus: Platydoris
- Species: P. galbana

Binomial name
- Platydoris galbana Burn, 1958

Species of gastropod

Platydoris galbana is a species of sea slug, a dorid nudibranch, shell-less marine opisthobranch gastropod mollusks in the family Discodorididae.

== Distribution ==
This species was described from Phillip Island, Victoria, Australia. It has been reported from New South Wales.
