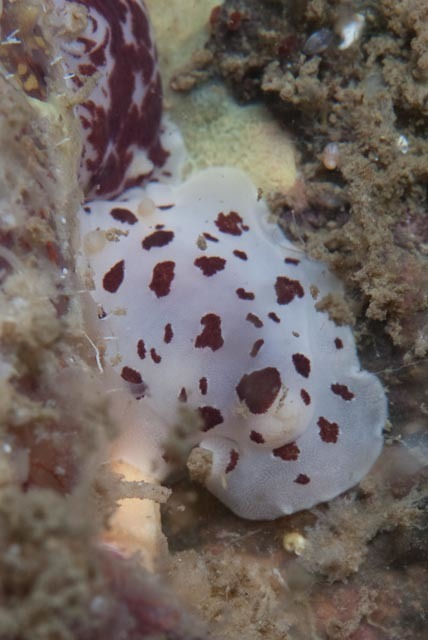

Scientific classification
- Kingdom: Animalia
- Phylum: Mollusca
- Class: Gastropoda
- Order: Nudibranchia
- Family: Discodorididae
- Genus: Gargamella
- Species: G. bovina

Binomial name
- Gargamella bovina Garavoy, Valdes & Gosliner, 1999

= Gargamella bovina =

Species of gastropod

Gargamella bovina, also known as the Cow Granulated Dorid, is a species of sea slug or dorid nudibranch, a marine gastropod mollusk in the family Discodorididae.

== Distribution ==
This species was described from South Africa.
