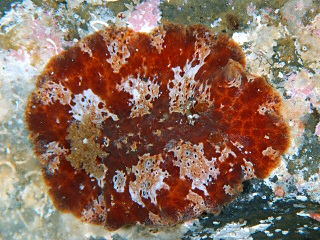

Scientific classification
- Kingdom: Animalia
- Phylum: Mollusca
- Class: Gastropoda
- Order: Nudibranchia
- Family: Discodorididae
- Genus: Platydoris
- Species: P. ellioti

Binomial name
- Platydoris ellioti (Alder & Hancock, 1864)

Synonyms
- Doris ellioti Alder & Hancock, 1864; Doris speciosa Abraham, 1877; Kentrodoris pseudofusca Risbec, 1928

= Platydoris ellioti =

Species of gastropod

Platydoris ellioti is a species of sea slug, a dorid nudibranch, a shell-less marine opisthobranch gastropod mollusks in the family Discodorididae.

== Distribution ==
This species was described from India. It is reported from the East coast of Africa to northern Australia.
