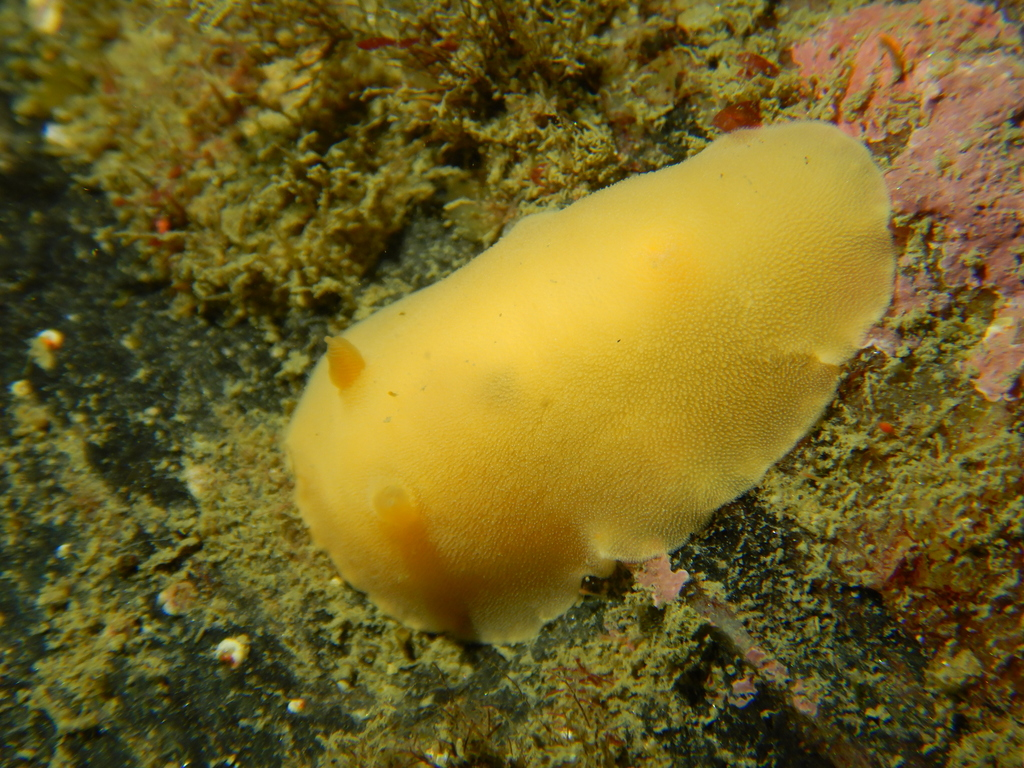

Scientific classification
- Kingdom: Animalia
- Phylum: Mollusca
- Class: Gastropoda
- Order: Nudibranchia
- Family: Discodorididae
- Genus: Gargamella
- Species: G. immaculata

Binomial name
- Gargamella immaculata Bergh, 1894

= Gargamella immaculata =

Species of gastropod

Gargamella immaculata is a species of sea slug or dorid nudibranch, a marine gastropod mollusk in the family Discodorididae.
