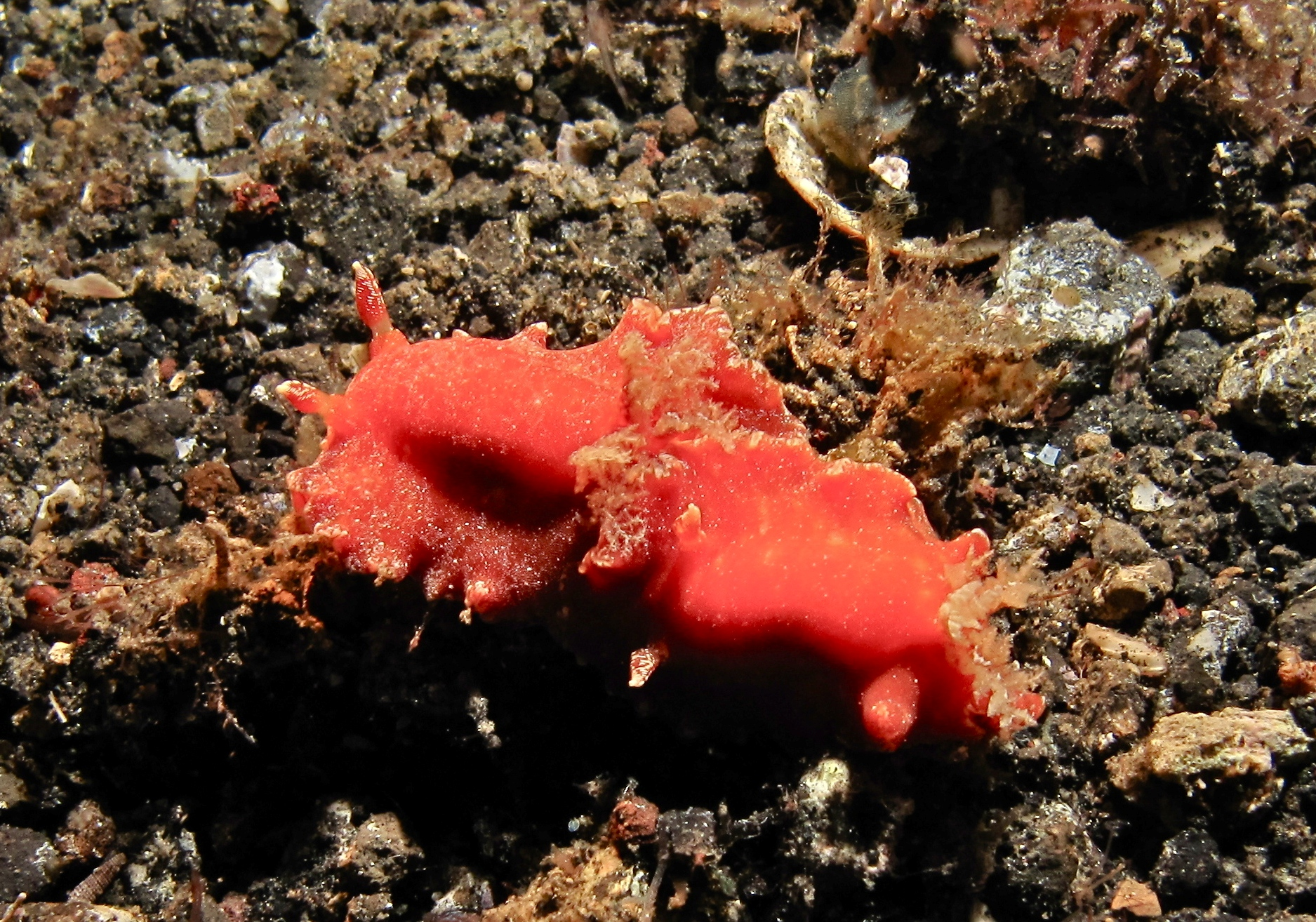

Scientific classification
- Kingdom: Animalia
- Phylum: Mollusca
- Class: Gastropoda
- Order: Nudibranchia
- Family: Discodorididae
- Genus: Platydoris
- Species: P. sanguinea

Binomial name
- Platydoris sanguinea Bergh, 1905

= Platydoris sanguinea =

Species of gastropod

Platydoris sanguinea is a species of sea slug, a dorid nudibranch, shell-less marine opisthobranch gastropod mollusks in the family Discodorididae.

== Distribution ==
This species was described from the south island of the Saleyer Islands, Sulawesi, Indonesia. It is known only from the Philippines and Indonesia.
