= Platydoris carolynae =

Scientific classification
- Domain: Eukaryota
- Kingdom: Animalia
- Phylum: Mollusca
- Class: Gastropoda
- Order: Nudibranchia
- Family: Discodorididae
- Genus: Platydoris
- Species: P. carolynae

Binomial name
- Platydoris carolynae Mulliner & Sphon, 1974

Species of gastropod

Platydoris carolynae is a species of sea slug, a dorid nudibranch, shell-less marine opisthobranch gastropod mollusks in the family Discodorididae.

== Distribution ==
The holotype for this species was collected intertidally at the docking area for the Charles Darwin Research Station, 0.744011°S 90.306749°W, Galapagos Islands in 1964. Seven paratype specimens were collected from the intertidal zone down to 10 m depth in 1971 and 1972 from Santa Cruz Island, Jervis Island and Isabella Island. The 1971 specimens were collected by the Ameripagos expedition which carried out the first investigations into the nudibranchs of the Galapagos Islands.

== Description ==
Platydoris carolynae is a large, flattened dorid nudibranch with a distinctive pattern of irregular, merging black or brown markings on a cream background. Adults grow to at least 45 mm in length and 32 mm wide. The underside of the mantle is also cream with black or brown spotting, each spot made up of multiple fine cross-hatched lines. The rhinophores are tan-coloured with dark brown spots. The gills are translucent with dark brown or black specks.
