= Platydoris angustipes =

Scientific classification
- Kingdom: Animalia
- Phylum: Mollusca
- Class: Gastropoda
- Order: Nudibranchia
- Family: Discodorididae
- Genus: Platydoris
- Species: P. angustipes

Binomial name
- Platydoris angustipes (Mörch, 1863)

Synonyms
- Doris angustipes Mörch, 1863; Platydoris alaleta Bergh, 1877; Platydoris rubra White, 1952

Species of gastropod

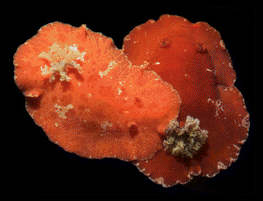
Photo of dorsal view of two specimens of Platydoris angustipes.

Platydoris angustipes is a species of sea slug, a dorid nudibranch, shell-less marine opisthobranch gastropod mollusks in the family Discodorididae.

== Distribution ==
This species was described from Saint Thomas, U.S. Virgin Islands. The distribution of Platydoris angustipes includes the Central American mainland, also from Florida to Panama, and the Greater Antilles, the Cayman Islands, the Lesser Antilles, the Turks and Caicos, and Brazil.

== Description ==
The body is oval with a maximum recorded body length of 150 mm (5.9 in). The mantle is rigid. The dorsum is flattened and covered with caryophyllidia. The background color ranges from reddish brown to red or orange with scattered white specks often clustered in 3–4 dense groups. The mantle margin is often darker or lighter than the rest of the mantle with proportionally more white patches. The rhinophores are dark brown with cylindrical apex. The gill is translucent straw-colored often with numerous opaque white spots.

== Ecology ==
It occurs at the water surface to depths of 73 m (240 ft). It was found under rocks in Panama. This species possibly has lecithotrophic development.
