= Platydoris dierythros =

Scientific classification
- Kingdom: Animalia
- Phylum: Mollusca
- Class: Gastropoda
- Order: Nudibranchia
- Family: Discodorididae
- Genus: Platydoris
- Species: P. dierythros

Binomial name
- Platydoris dierythros Fahey & Valdés, 2003

Species of gastropod

Platydoris dierythros is a species of sea slug, a dorid nudibranch, shell-less marine opisthobranch gastropod mollusks in the family Discodorididae.

== Distribution ==
This species was described from NW Australia and Northern Territory, Australia.
