= Gargamella lemchei =

Scientific classification
- Kingdom: Animalia
- Phylum: Mollusca
- Class: Gastropoda
- Order: Nudibranchia
- Family: Discodorididae
- Genus: Gargamella
- Species: G. lemchei

Binomial name
- Gargamella lemchei (Ev. Marcus, 1976)

Synonyms
- Jorunna lemchei Ev. Marcus, 1976 (original combination)

Species of gastropod

Gargamella lemchei is a species of sea slug. A dorid nudibranch, it is a shell-less marine gastropod mollusc in the Discodorididae family.

== Distribution ==
This species was described from Ballyvaughan Bay, Ireland.
