= Platydoris spongilla =

Scientific classification
- Kingdom: Animalia
- Phylum: Mollusca
- Class: Gastropoda
- Order: Nudibranchia
- Family: Discodorididae
- Genus: Platydoris
- Species: P. spongilla

Binomial name
- Platydoris spongilla Risbec, 1928

Species of gastropod

Platydoris spongilla is a species of sea slug, a dorid nudibranch, shell-less marine opisthobranch gastropod mollusks in the family Discodorididae.

== Distribution ==
This species was described from New Caledonia.
