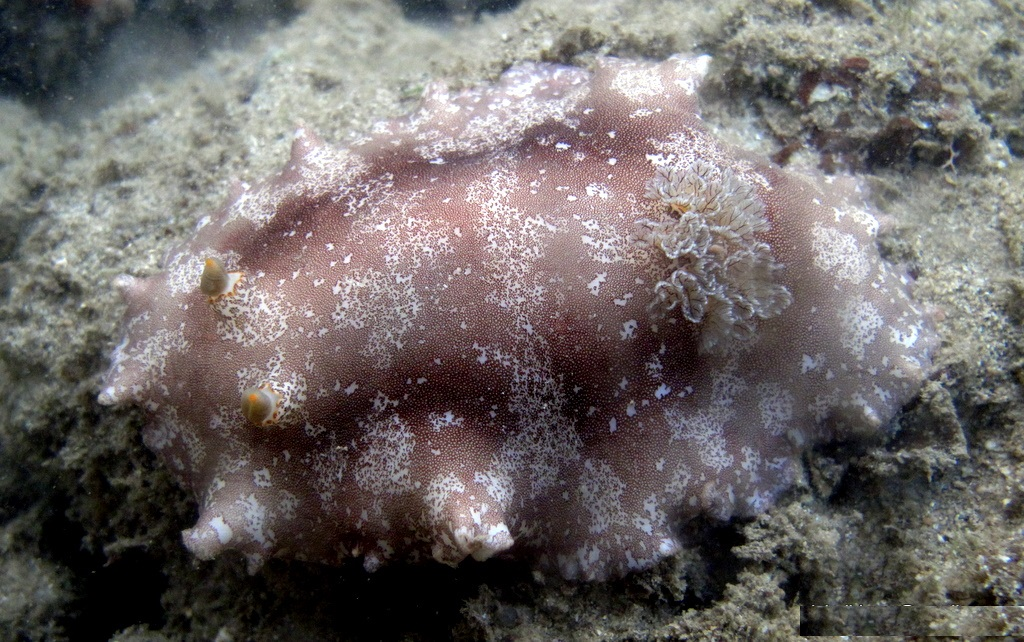

Scientific classification
- Domain: Eukaryota
- Kingdom: Animalia
- Phylum: Mollusca
- Class: Gastropoda
- Order: Nudibranchia
- Family: Discodorididae
- Genus: Platydoris
- Species: P. scabra

Binomial name
- Platydoris scabra (Cuvier, 1804)

Synonyms
- Platydoris eurychlamys Bergh, 1877; Platydoris noumeae Risbec, 1928

= Platydoris scabra =

Species of gastropod

Platydoris scabra is a species of sea slug, a dorid nudibranch, shell-less marine opisthobranch gastropod mollusks in the family Discodorididae.

== Distribution ==
This species was described from Timor. It is reported widely in the tropical Indo-Pacific Ocean.
