= Platydoris carinata =

Scientific classification
- Kingdom: Animalia
- Phylum: Mollusca
- Class: Gastropoda
- Order: Nudibranchia
- Family: Discodorididae
- Genus: Platydoris
- Species: P. carinata

Binomial name
- Platydoris carinata Risbec, 1928

Species of gastropod

Platydoris carinata is a species of sea slug, a dorid nudibranch, shell-less marine opisthobranch gastropod mollusks in the family Discodorididae found in New Caledonia.
