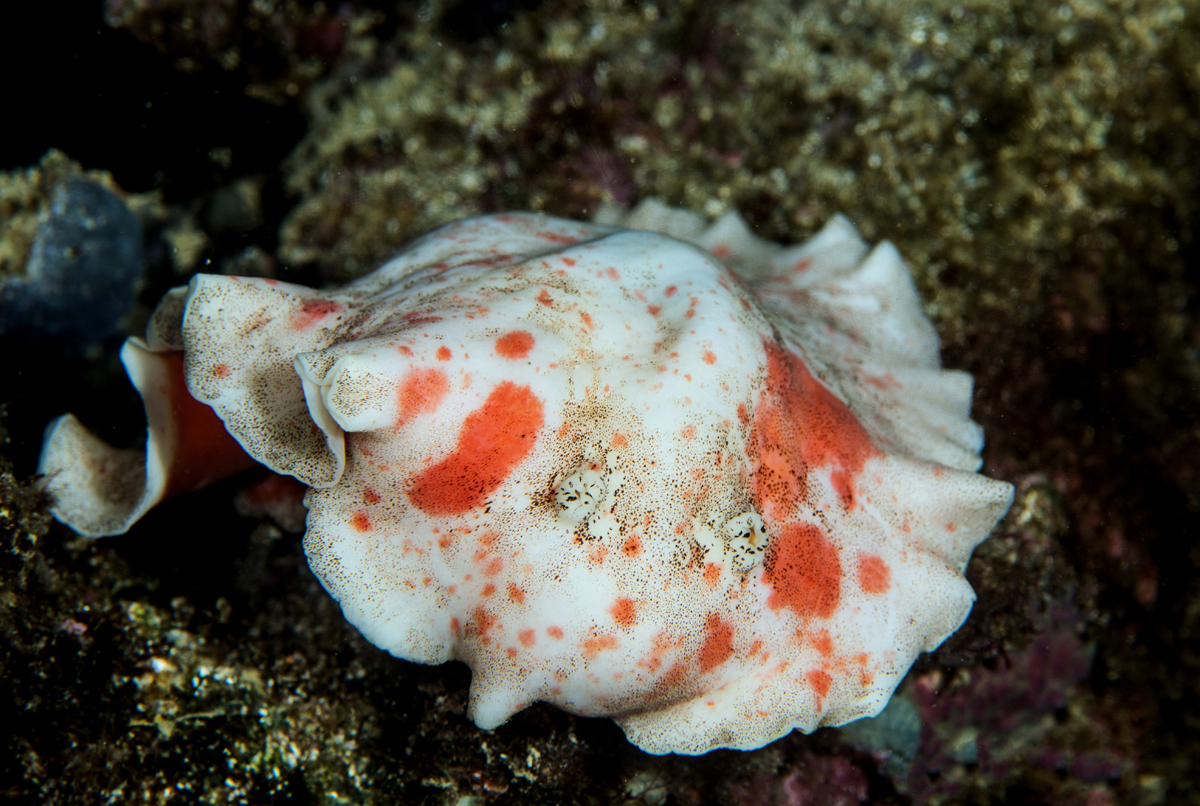

Scientific classification
- Kingdom: Animalia
- Phylum: Mollusca
- Class: Gastropoda
- Order: Nudibranchia
- Family: Discodorididae
- Genus: Platydoris
- Species: P. formosa

Binomial name
- Platydoris formosa (Alder & Hancock, 1864)

Synonyms
- Doris formosa Alder & Hancock, 1864

= Platydoris formosa =

Species of gastropod

Platydoris formosa is a species of sea slug, a dorid nudibranch, shell-less marine opisthobranch gastropod mollusks in the family Discodorididae.

== Distribution ==
This species was described from India. It is widespread in the tropical Indo-Pacific from Zanzibar, Africa to Hawaii.
