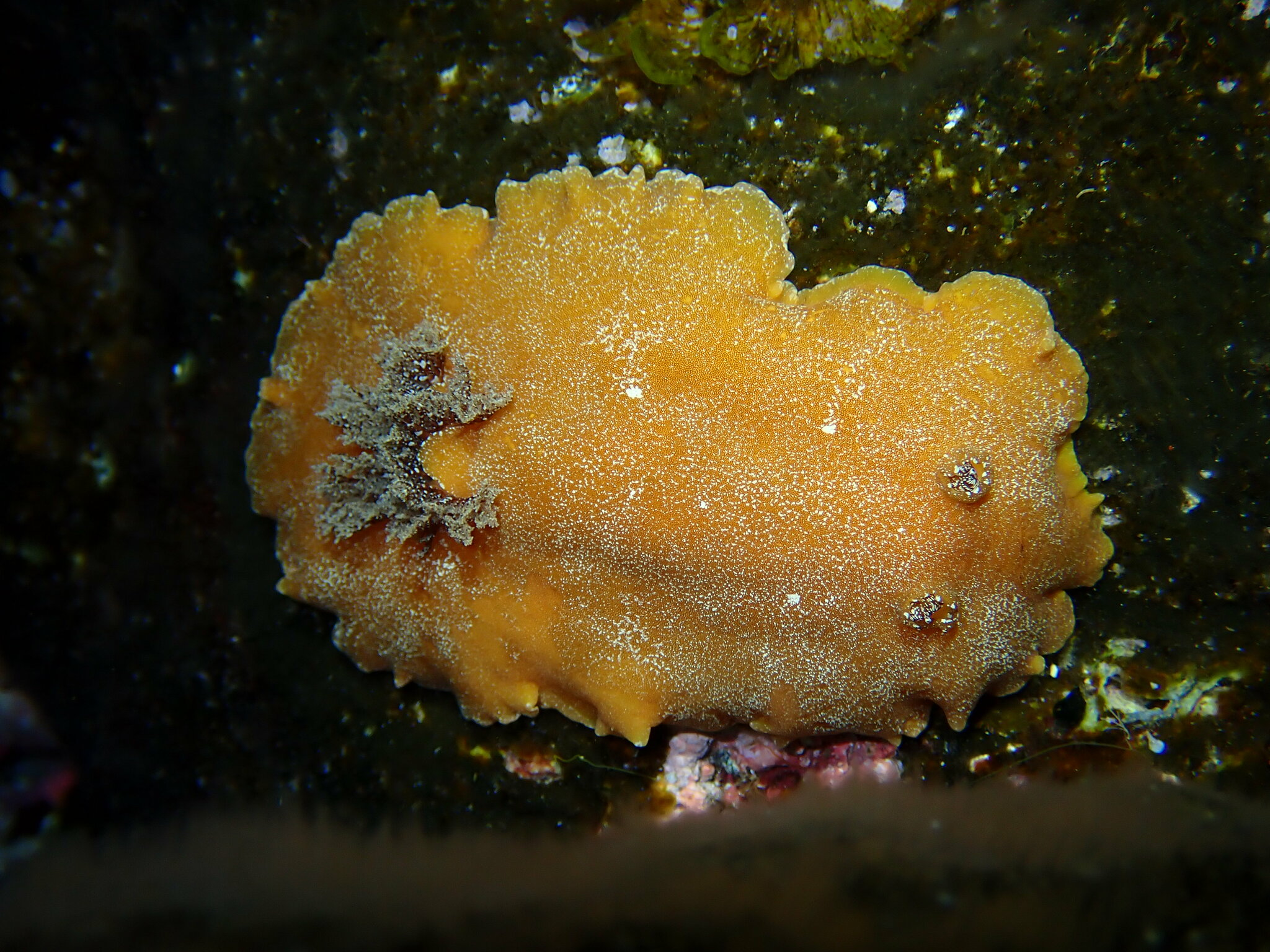

Scientific classification
- Kingdom: Animalia
- Phylum: Mollusca
- Class: Gastropoda
- Order: Nudibranchia
- Family: Discodorididae
- Genus: Platydoris
- Species: P. argo

Binomial name
- Platydoris argo (Linnaeus, 1767)

Synonyms
- Doris argo Linnaeus, 1767; Doris canariensis d'Orbigny, 1839; Doris infravalvata Abraham, 1877; Doris subtumida Abraham, 1877; Platydoris dura Pruvot-Fol, 1951; Platydoris philippi Bergh, 1877

= Platydoris argo =

Species of nudibranch

Platydoris argo, the redbrown nudibranch or redbrown leathery doris, is a species of dorid nudibranch, a sea slug, in the family Discodorididae.

== Distribution ==
This species is known from the Mediterranean Sea and adjacent Atlantic Ocean.
