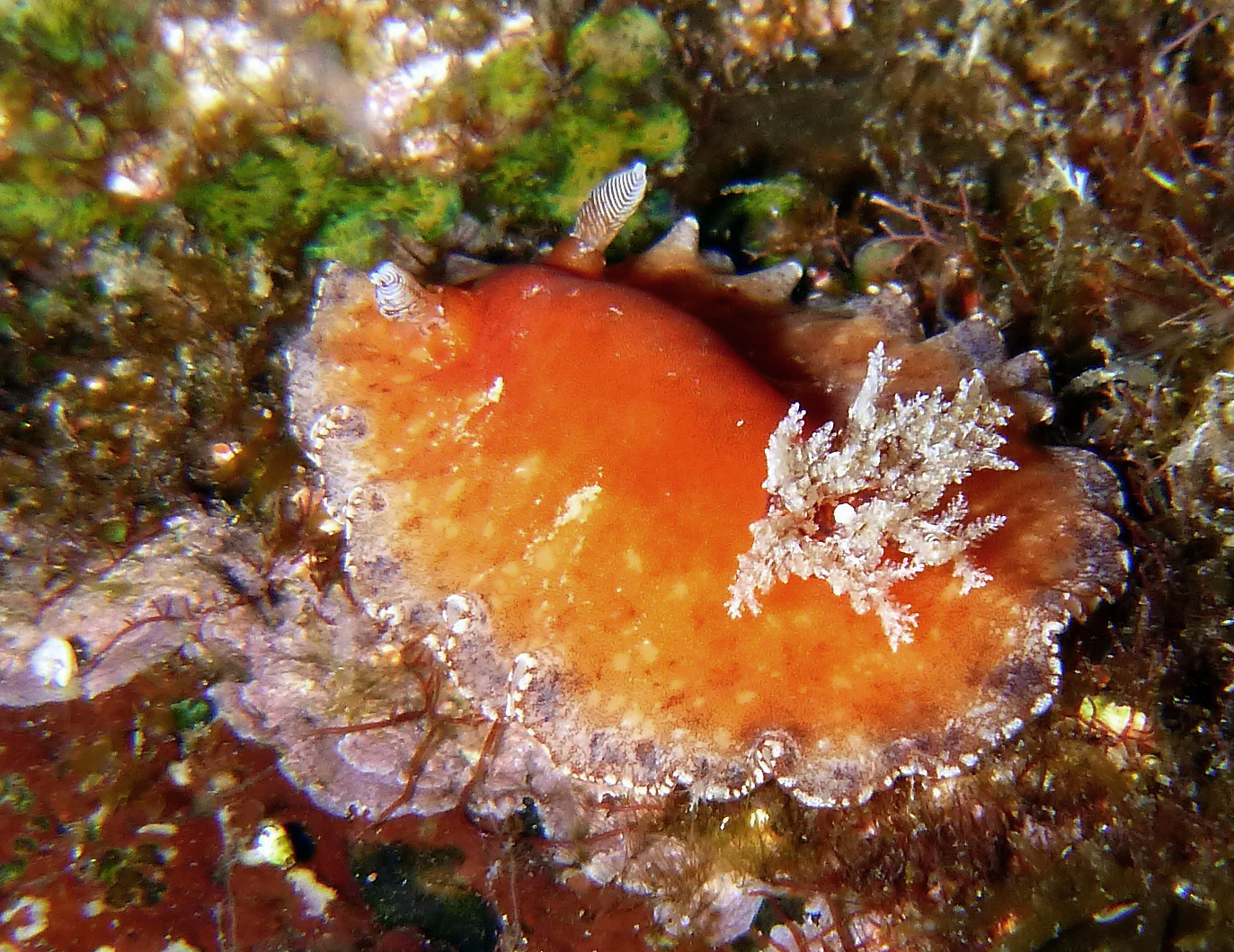

Scientific classification
- Kingdom: Animalia
- Phylum: Mollusca
- Class: Gastropoda
- Order: Nudibranchia
- Family: Discodorididae
- Genus: Platydoris
- Species: P. pulchra

Binomial name
- Platydoris pulchra Eliot, 1904

= Platydoris pulchra =

Species of gastropod

Platydoris pulchra is a species of sea slug, a dorid nudibranch, shell-less marine opisthobranch gastropod mollusks in the family Discodorididae.

== Distribution ==
This species was described from Wasin, Kenya. It is reported from Tanzania, Madagascar and Sri Lanka.
