= Doris nucleola =

Scientific classification
- Kingdom: Animalia
- Phylum: Mollusca
- Class: Gastropoda
- Order: Nudibranchia
- Family: Dorididae
- Genus: Doris
- Species: D. nucleola

Binomial name
- Doris nucleola Pease, 1860

Species of gastropod

Doris nucleola is a species of sea slug, a dorid nudibranch, a marine gastropod mollusc in the family Dorididae.

== Distribution ==
This species was described from the Sandwich Islands (Hawaiian Islands). It has been confused with Doris immonda and is considered unrecognisable by some authors.
