= Gargamella wareni =

Scientific classification
- Kingdom: Animalia
- Phylum: Mollusca
- Class: Gastropoda
- Order: Nudibranchia
- Family: Discodorididae
- Genus: Gargamella
- Species: G. wareni

Binomial name
- Gargamella wareni Valdes & Gosliner, 2001

Species of gastropod

Gargamella wareni is a species of sea slug or dorid nudibranch, a marine gastropod mollusk in the family Discodorididae.

== Distribution ==
Gargamella wareni is found off the coast of New Caledonia.
