= Baptodoris phinei =

Scientific classification
- Kingdom: Animalia
- Phylum: Mollusca
- Class: Gastropoda
- Order: Nudibranchia
- Family: Discodorididae
- Genus: Baptodoris
- Species: B. phinei

Binomial name
- Baptodoris phinei Valdes, 2001

Species of gastropod

Baptodoris phinei is a species of sea slug or dorid nudibranch, a marine gastropod mollusk in the family Discodorididae.

== Distribution ==
Baptodoris phinei is found in the waters of New Caledonia.
