= Platydoris annulata =

Scientific classification
- Kingdom: Animalia
- Phylum: Mollusca
- Class: Gastropoda
- Order: Nudibranchia
- Family: Discodorididae
- Genus: Platydoris
- Species: P. annulata

Binomial name
- Platydoris annulata Dorgan, Valdés & Gosliner, 2002

Species of gastropod

Platydoris annulata is a species of sea slug, a dorid nudibranch, shell-less marine opisthobranch gastropod mollusks in the family Discodorididae.

== Distribution ==
This species was described from a single specimen captured at a depth of 166–172 m in the Philippines at 13°16′N 122°46′E. It was reported from the Andaman Sea at depths of 303-313 m.
