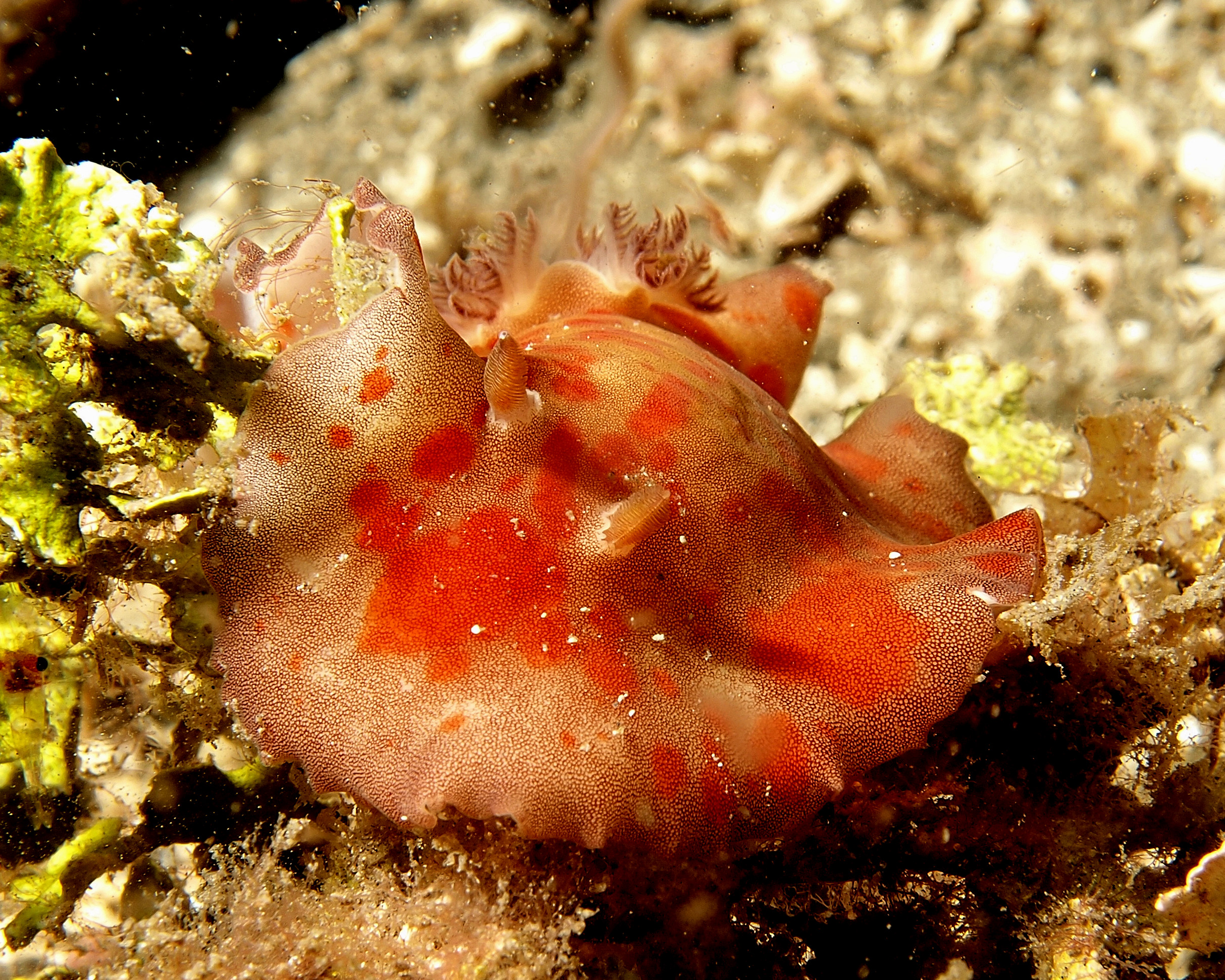

Scientific classification
- Kingdom: Animalia
- Phylum: Mollusca
- Class: Gastropoda
- Order: Nudibranchia
- Family: Discodorididae
- Genus: Platydoris
- Species: P. cinereobranchiata

Binomial name
- Platydoris cinereobranchiata Dorgan, Valdés & Gosliner, 2002

= Platydoris cinereobranchiata =

Species of gastropod

Platydoris cinereobranchiata is a species of sea slug, a dorid nudibranch, shell-less marine opisthobranch gastropod mollusks in the family Discodorididae.

== Distribution ==
This species was described from Anilao and Maricaban Island, Batangas, Luzon, Philippines. It was also reported from the Seychelles as Platydoris tabulata. Further distribution includes the Solomon Islands.
