= Platydoris macfarlandi =

Scientific classification
- Kingdom: Animalia
- Phylum: Mollusca
- Class: Gastropoda
- Order: Nudibranchia
- Family: Discodorididae
- Genus: Platydoris
- Species: P. macfarlandi

Binomial name
- Platydoris macfarlandi Hanna, 1951

Species of gastropod

Platydoris macfarlandi is a species of sea slug, a dorid nudibranch, shell-less marine opisthobranch gastropod mollusks in the family Discodorididae.

== Distribution ==
This species was described from three specimens captured at depths of 157–161 m (515–528 ft). off Pismo Beach, San Luis Obispo Bay, California, 35.144950°N 120.656636°W. It has also been found in deep water (55–113 m (180–371 ft)) at Redondo Canyon, Los Angeles County and at 30 m (98 ft) depth at Bahia San Cristobal, Baja California, Mexico, 27°24′28″N 114°39′40″W.
