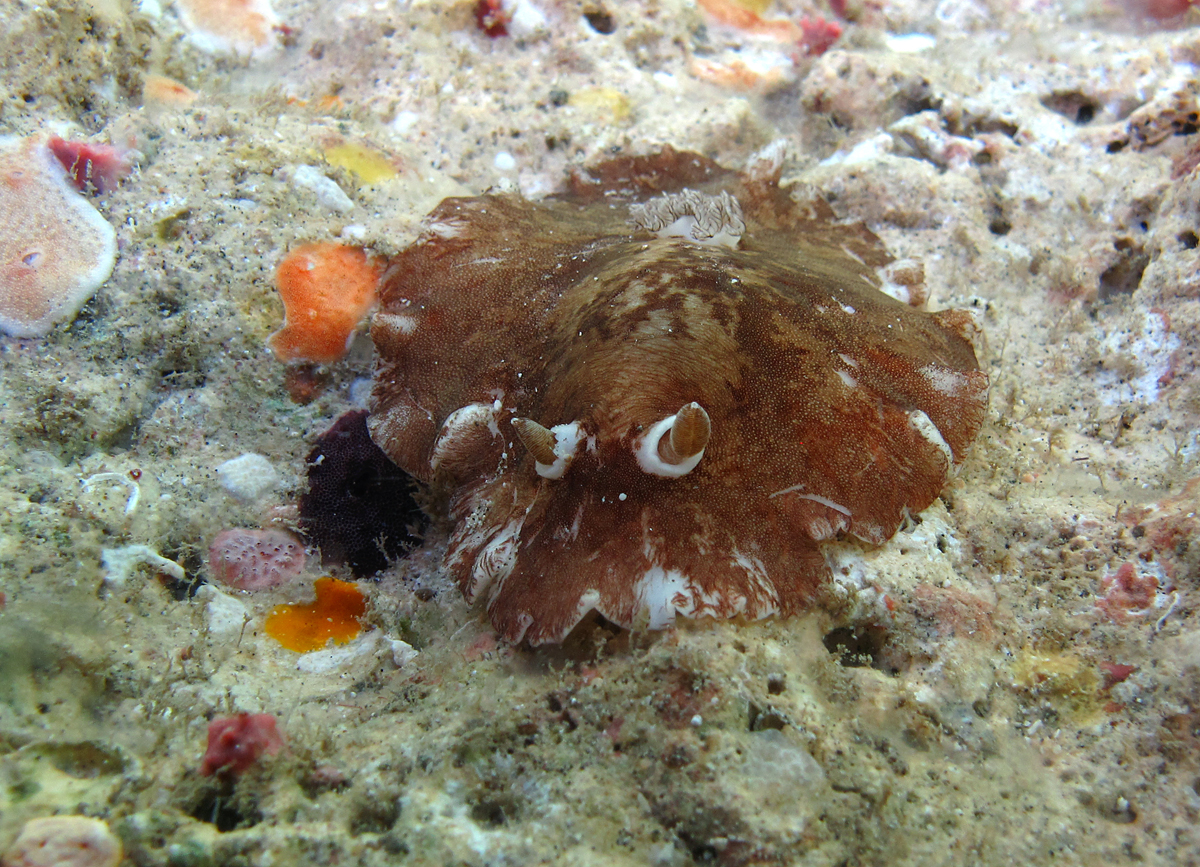

Scientific classification
- Kingdom: Animalia
- Phylum: Mollusca
- Class: Gastropoda
- Order: Nudibranchia
- Family: Discodorididae
- Genus: Platydoris
- Species: P. cruenta

Binomial name
- Platydoris cruenta (Quoy & Gaimard, 1832–1833)

Synonyms
- Doris cruenta Quoy & Gaimard, 1832; Platydoris arrogans Bergh, 1877

= Platydoris cruenta =

Species of gastropod

Platydoris cruenta is a species of sea slug, a dorid nudibranch, shell-less marine opisthobranch gastropod mollusks in the family Discodorididae.

== Distribution ==
This species was described from New Guinea. It is widespread in the Indo-Pacific Ocean.
