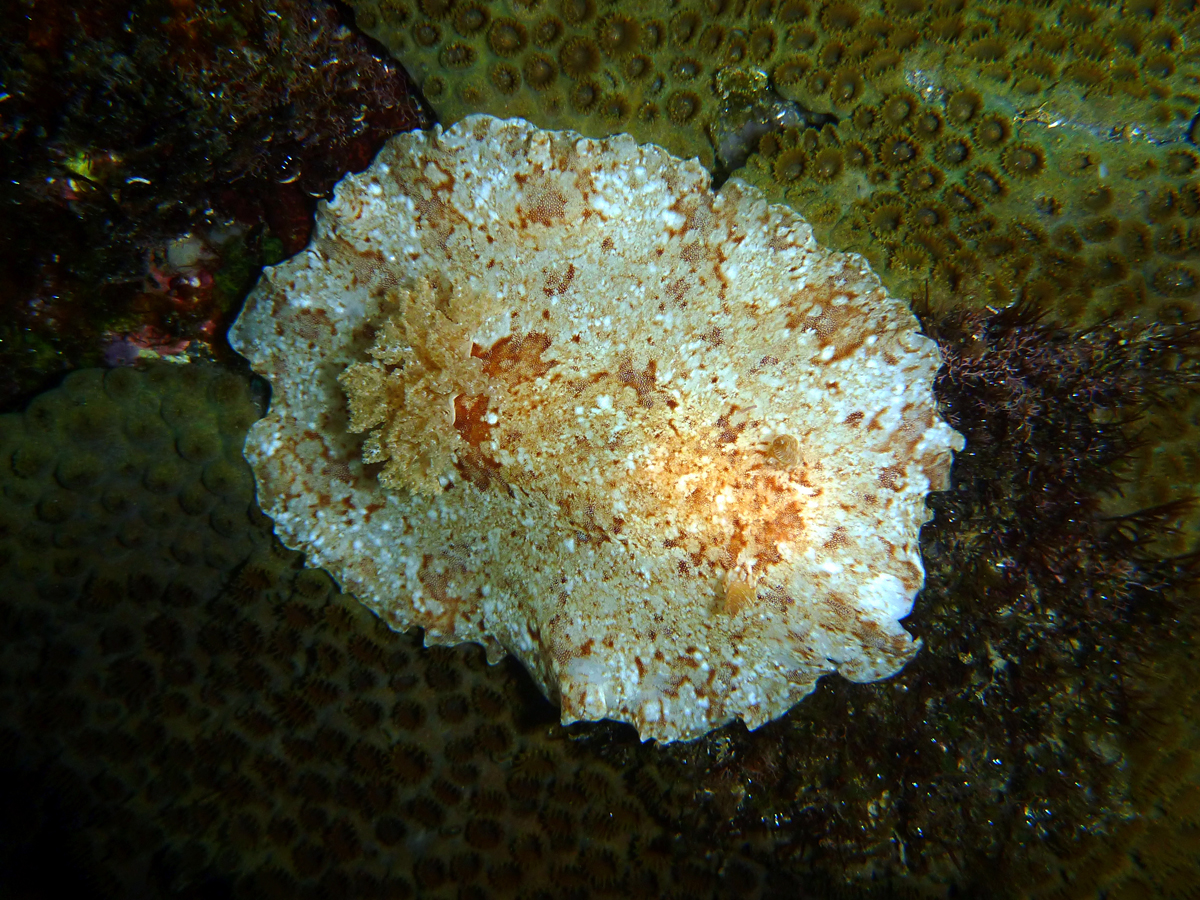
- Platydoris inframaculata

Scientific classification
- Kingdom: Animalia
- Phylum: Mollusca
- Class: Gastropoda
- Order: Nudibranchia
- Family: Discodorididae
- Genus: Platydoris
- Species: P. inframaculata

Binomial name
- Platydoris inframaculata (Abraham, 1877)

= Platydoris inframaculata =

Species of gastropod

Platydoris inframaculata is a species of sea slug, a dorid nudibranch, shell-less marine opisthobranch gastropod mollusks in the family Discodorididae.

== Distribution ==
This species was described from Ambon Island, Indonesia. It has also been studied in the Philippines and reported from Sri Lanka.
