= Platydoris rolani =

Scientific classification
- Kingdom: Animalia
- Phylum: Mollusca
- Class: Gastropoda
- Order: Nudibranchia
- Family: Discodorididae
- Genus: Platydoris
- Species: P. rolani

Binomial name
- Platydoris rolani Dorgan, Valdés & Gosliner, 2002

Species of gastropod

Platydoris rolani is a species of sea slug, a dorid nudibranch, shell-less marine opisthobranch gastropod mollusks in the family Discodorididae.

== Distribution ==
This species was described from Príncipe Island, Gulf of Guinea. The original description contains additional specimens from São Tomé.
