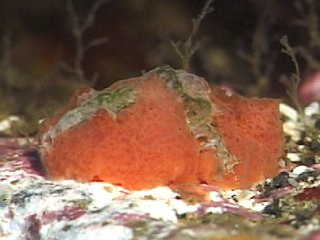

Scientific classification
- Kingdom: Animalia
- Phylum: Mollusca
- Class: Gastropoda
- Order: Nudibranchia
- Family: Dorididae
- Genus: Doris
- Species: D. immonda

Binomial name
- Doris immonda (Risbec, 1928)

Synonyms
- Platydoris immonda Risbec, 1928; Siraius immonda (Risbec, 1928); Siraius nucleola (Pease, 1860) sensu Brodie & Willan, 1993

= Doris immonda =

Species of gastropod

Doris immonda is a species of sea slug, a dorid nudibranch, a marine gastropod mollusc in the family Dorididae.

== Distribution ==
This species was described from New Caledonia. It is also reported from Australia and the Red Sea.

== Description ==
The relationship of Doris immonda to Doris nucleola Pease, 1860 is discussed and illustrated by Rudman, 2000. It is redescribed in detail by Valdes, 2002.
