= Baptodoris stomascuta =

Scientific classification
- Kingdom: Animalia
- Phylum: Mollusca
- Class: Gastropoda
- Order: Nudibranchia
- Family: Discodorididae
- Genus: Baptodoris
- Species: B. stomascuta

Binomial name
- Baptodoris stomascuta (Bouchet, 1977)

Synonyms
- Platydoris stomascuta

Species of gastropod

Baptodoris stomascuta is a species of sea slug or dorid nudibranch, a marine gastropod mollusk in the family Discodorididae.
