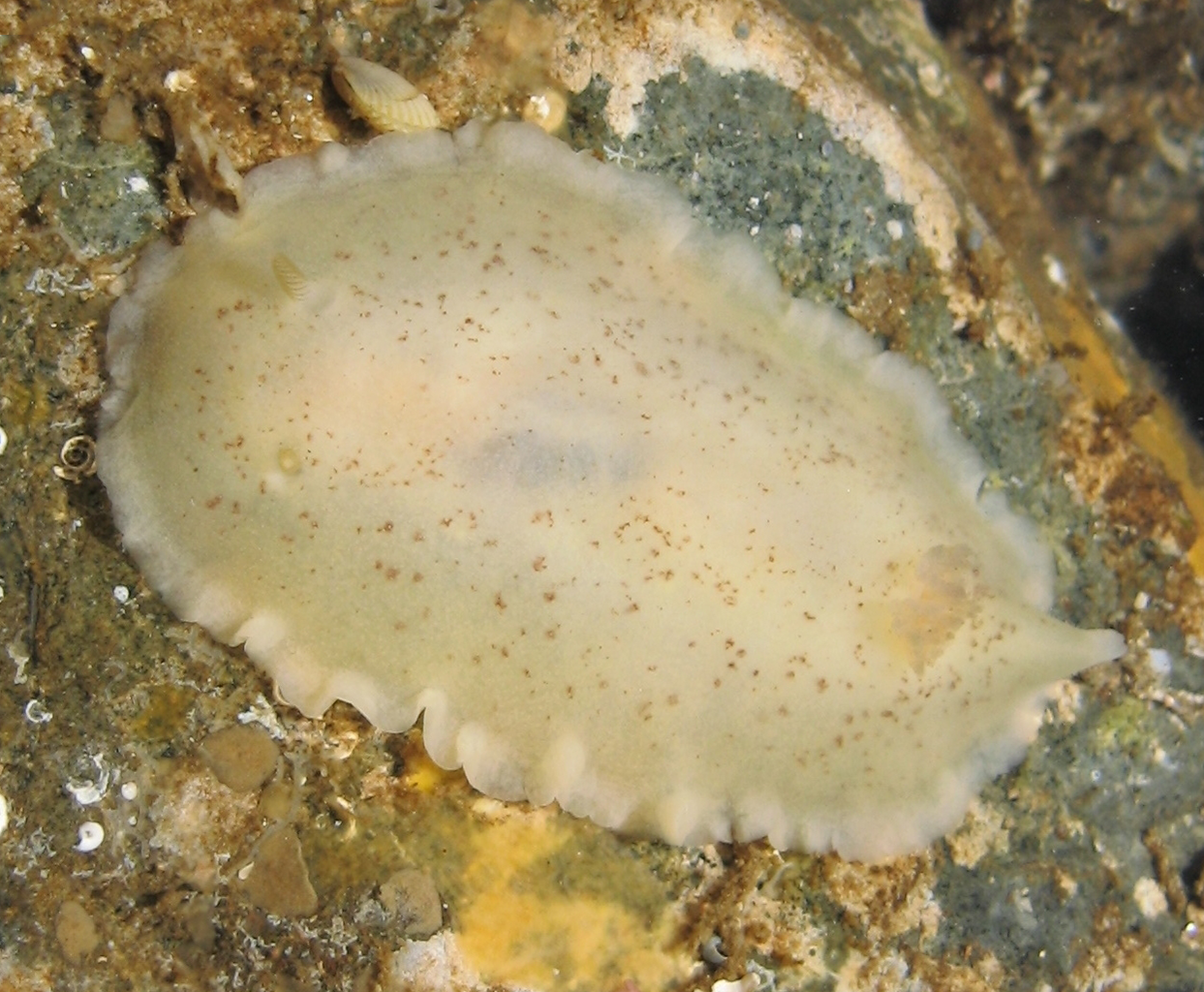
- Live specimen of Baptodoris peruviana

Scientific classification
- Kingdom: Animalia
- Phylum: Mollusca
- Class: Gastropoda
- Order: Nudibranchia
- Family: Discodorididae
- Genus: Baptodoris
- Species: B. peruviana

Binomial name
- Baptodoris peruviana (A. d'Orbigny, 1836)

Synonyms
- Doris peruviana A. d'Orbigny, 1836 superseded combination; Platydoris peruviana (A. d'Orbigny, 1836); Platydoris punctatella Bergh, 1898

= Baptodoris peruviana =

Species of gastropod

Baptodoris peruviana is a species of sea slug or dorid nudibranch, a marine gastropod mollusk in the family Discodorididae.

== Description ==
(Original description in French) The body is oval and strongly depressed. The mantle has thin, sharp edges and extends well beyond the foot. Its upper surface is covered with small, equal verrucae (warts), which are even smaller towards the margins; the underside is smooth. The foot is small and oblong, and is wider anteriorly. The head is small and bears conical, fairly long, and pointed oral tentacles on either side. The mouth is small.

The tentacles are club-shaped, pointed, and fairly elongated; they can be retracted into protective cavities. The openings of these cavities are not protruding and are entire. The gills are contractile and lie in a posterior cavity of the mantle. They are divided into six strongly branched and digitate lobes. The anus is situated at the centre of the branchial apparatus and forms a protruding tube. The excretory opening lies on the right side, in front of the anus.

The animal is entirely white, both above and below, except for the spaces between the verrucae on the back, which are brown. The total length of the animal is 5 cm, and the width is 3 cm.

== Distribution ==
This species occurs off Peru and Northern Chile.
