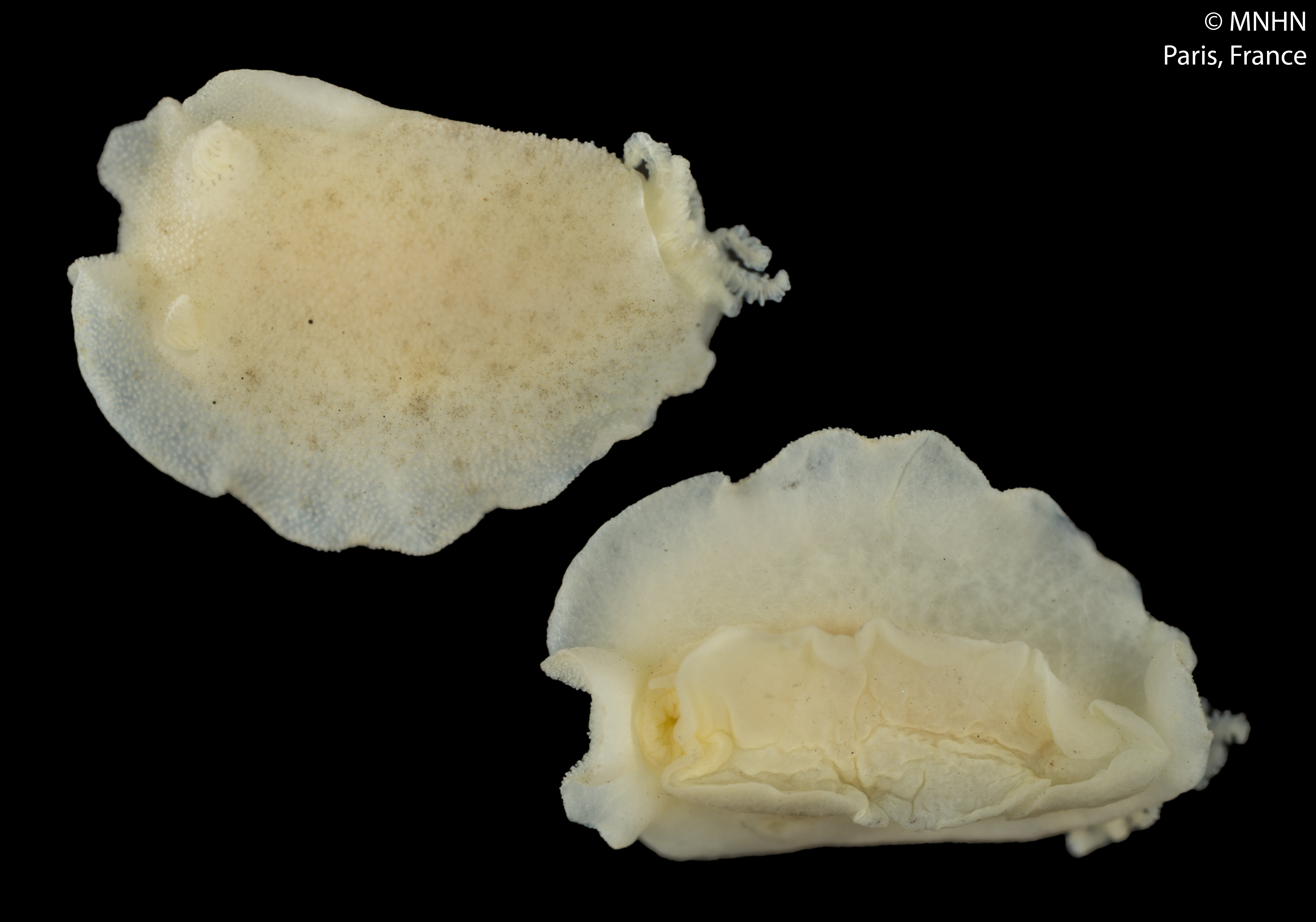

Scientific classification
- Kingdom: Animalia
- Phylum: Mollusca
- Class: Gastropoda
- Order: Nudibranchia
- Family: Discodorididae
- Genus: Gargamella
- Species: G. perezi

Binomial name
- Gargamella perezi (Llera & Ortea in Ortea, Perez & Llera, 1982)

Synonyms
- Baptodoris perezi

= Gargamella perezi =

Species of gastropod

Gargamella perezi is a species of sea slug or dorid nudibranch, a marine gastropod mollusk in the family Discodorididae.

== Distribution ==
This species has been reported from Spain.
