= Baptodoris cinnabarina =

Scientific classification
- Kingdom: Animalia
- Phylum: Mollusca
- Class: Gastropoda
- Order: Nudibranchia
- Family: Discodorididae
- Genus: Baptodoris
- Species: B. cinnabarina

Binomial name
- Baptodoris cinnabarina Bergh, 1884

Species of gastropod

Baptodoris cinnabarina is a species of sea slug or dorid nudibranch, a marine gastropod mollusk in the family Discodorididae. The original description was revised in 1999.

== Distribution ==
This species occurs in the Mediterranean Sea and adjacent coast of the Atlantic Ocean.
