= Baía da Parda =

Bay in Sal, Cape Verde

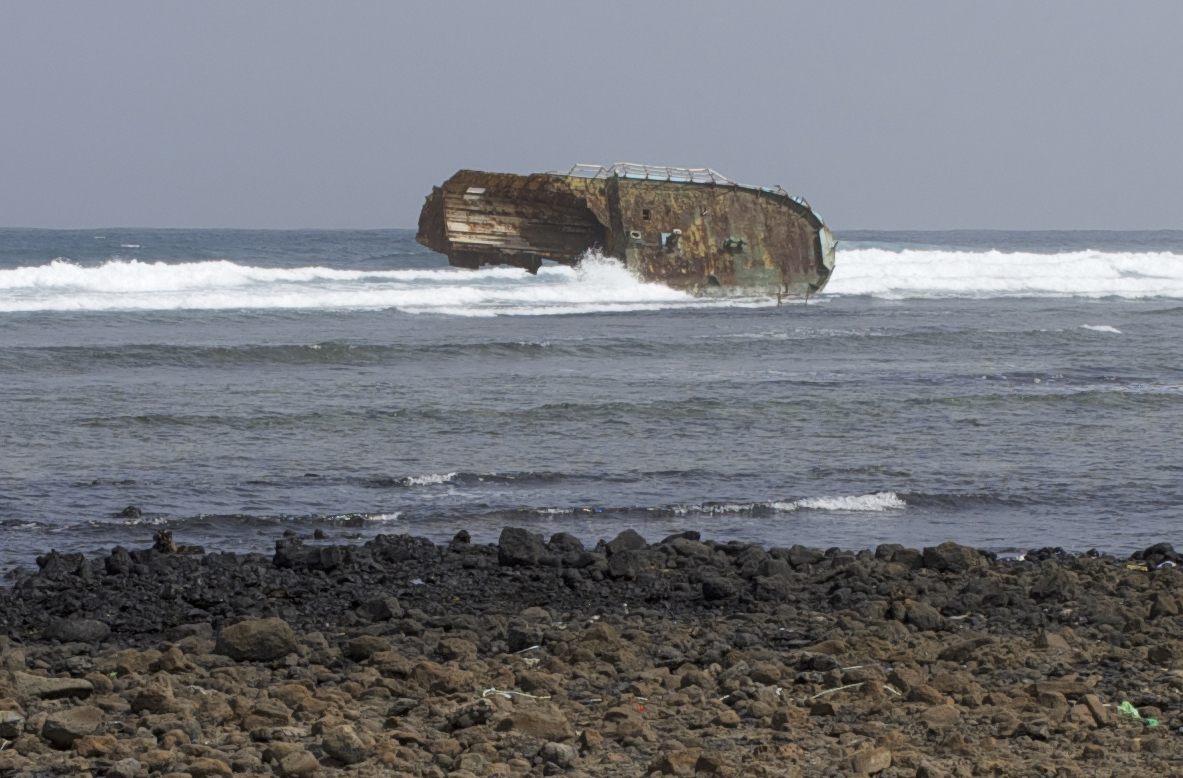
- A wrecked fishing boat in the bay

- Location within Cape Verde
- Location: East coast of Sal, Cape Verde
- Coordinates: 16.731°N 22.896°W

Baía da Parda is a small bay on the east coast of the island of Sal, Cape Verde. It lies about 3 km south of Pedra de Lume, and 5 km southeast of the island capital Espargos. It is known for its reefs, which are frequented by sharks.
