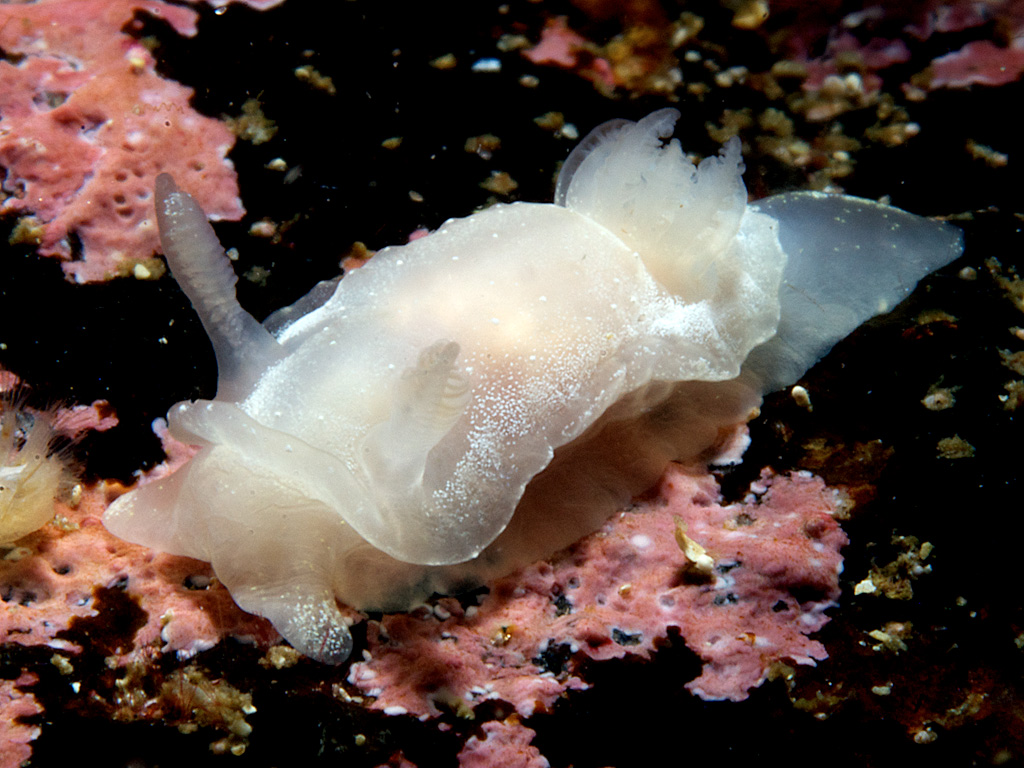
- The nudibranch Goniodoris nodosa, Gulen Dive Resort, Norway.

Scientific classification
- Kingdom: Animalia
- Phylum: Mollusca
- Class: Gastropoda
- Order: Nudibranchia
- Family: Goniodorididae
- Genus: Goniodoris; Forbes & Goodsir, 1839

= Goniodoris =

Genus of gastropods

Goniodoris is a defunct genus of sea slugs, specifically dorid nudibranchs, marine gastropod molluscs in the family Goniodorididae.

It is currently an unaccepted genus, housing only a few nomen dubium individuals.

== Status ==
A global revision of Goniodorid taxonomy in 2024 found that Goniodoris nodosa, the types species of the genus, grouped phylogenetically with Okenia and should be classified as such. The remainder of Goniodoris species however had morphology consistent with Pelagella (a genus who was resurrected the year prior, splitting off from Goniodoris) so it was decided that all Goniodoris species except G. nodosa should be transferred to Pelagella, while Goniodoris follow its type taxon and be officially regarded as a synonym of Okenia.

== Species ==
Nomen dubium under Goniodoris include:

- Goniodoris flavidula Bergh, 1873
- Goniodoris regalis Forbes, 1844
- Goniodoris tenerrima Forbes, 1844

Species formerly within Goniodoris include:

- Goniodoris aspersa Alder & A. Hancock, 1864: synonym of Pelagella aspersa (Alder & Hancock, 1864)
- Goniodoris atromarginata (Cuvier, 1804): synonym of Doriprismatica atromarginata (Cuvier, 1804)
- Goniodoris barroisi Vayssière, 1901: synonym of Pelagella barroisi Vayssière, 1901
- Goniodoris bennetti Angas, 1864: synonym of Hypselodoris bennetti (Angas, 1864)
- Goniodoris brunnea Macnae, 1958: synonym of Pelagella castanea (Alder & Hancock, 1845)
- Goniodoris castanea Alder & Hancock, 1845: synonym of Pelagella castanea (Alder & Hancock, 1845)
- Goniodoris citrina Alder & Hancock, 1864 : synonym of Pelagella citrina (Alder & Hancock, 1864)
- Goniodoris coelestis Deshayes, 1865: synonym of Felimare orsinii (Vérany, 1846)
- Goniodoris crossei Angas, 1864: synonym of Hypselodoris obscura (Stimpson, 1855)
- Goniodoris danielsseni Friele & Hansen, 1876: synonym of Lophodoris danielsseni (Friele & Hansen, 1876)
- Goniodoris daphne Angas, 1864: synonym of Goniobranchus daphne (Angas, 1864)
- Goniodoris elegans (Cantraine, 1835): synonym of Felimare picta (Schultz in Philippi, 1836)
- Goniodoris emarginata Forbes, 1840: synonym of Okenia nodosa (Montagu, 1808)
- Gondiodoris erinaceaus Crosse, 1864: synonym of Atagema intecta (Kelaart,1858)
- Goniodoris felis Baba, 1949: synonym of Pelagella felis (Baba, 1949)
- Goniodoris festiva Angas, 1864: synonym of Mexichromis festiva (Angas, 1864)
- Goniodoris glabra Baba, 1937: synonym of Pelagella joubini (Risbec, 1928)
- Goniodoris godeffroyana (Bergh, 1977): synonym of Hypselodoris godeffroyana (Bergh, 1977)
- Goniodoris kolabana Winckworth, 1946: synonym of Pelagella kolabana (Winckworth, 1946)
- Goniodoris lamberti Crosse, 1875: synonym of Glossodoris lamberti (Crosse, 1875)
- Goniodoris loringi Angas, 1864: synonym of Goniobranchus loringi (Angas, 1864)
- Goniodoris mariei Crosse, 1872: synonym of Mexichromis mariei (Crosse, 1872)
- Goniodoris meraculus Burn, 1958: synonym of Pelagella meracula (Burn, 1958)
- Goniodoris mercurialis Macnae, 1958: synonym of Pelagella mercurialis (Macnae, 1958)
- Goniodoris mimula Marcus, 1955: synonym of Pelagella mimula (Er. Marcus, 1955)
- Goniodoris modesta Alder & Hancock, 1864: synonym of Pelagella modesta (Alder & Hancock, 1864)
- Goniodoris montrouzieri Crosse, 1875: synonym of Dendrodoris nigra (Stimpson, 1855)
- Goniodoris nodosa (Montagu, 1808): type species (originally described as Doris nodosa Montagu, 1808): synonym of Okenia nodosa (Montagu, 1808)
- Goniodoris noregna Ortea & Moro, 2021: synonym of Pelagella noregna (Ortea & Moro, 2021)
- Goniodoris obscura Stimpson, 1855: synonym of Hypselodoris obscura (Stimpson, 1855)
- Goniodoris ovata Barnard, 1934: synonym of Pelagella ovata (Barnard, 1934)
- Goniodoris paretii (Verany, 1846) [synonym of Pelagella castanea Alder & Hancock, 1845
- Goniodoris petiti Crosse, 1875: synonym of Pelagella petiti (Crosse, 1875)
- Goniodoris picturata Mörch, 1863: synonym of Glossodoris moerchi (Bergh, 1879)
- Goniodoris punctata Bergh, 1905: synonym of Pelagella punctata (Bergh, 1905)
- Goniodoris savignyi Pruvot-Fol, 1933: synonym of Goniodoridella savignyi (Pruvot-Fol, 1933)
- Goniodoris souverbiei Crosse, 1875: synonym of Glossodoris souverbiei (Crosse, 1875)
- Goniodoris splendida Angas, 1864: synonym of Goniobranchus splendidus (Angas, 1864)
- Goniodoris sugashimae Baba, 1960: synonym of Pelagella sugashimae (Baba, 1960)
- Goniodoris trilineata A. Adams & Reeve, 1850: synonym of Mexichromis trilineata (A. Adams & Reeve, 1850)
- Goniodoris tryoni Garrett, 1873: synonym of Hypselodoris tryoni (Garrett, 1873)
- Goniodoris verrieri Crosse, 1875: synonym of Goniobranchus verrieri (Crosse, 1875)
- Goniodoris verrucosa Crosse in Angas, 1864: synonym of Thordisa verrucosa (Crosse in Angas, 1864)
- Goniodoris violacea Risbec, 1928: synonym of Pelagella violacea (Risbec, 1928)
- Goniodoris whitei A. Adams & Reeve, 1850: synonym of Hypselodoris whitei (A. Adams & Reeve, 1850)
