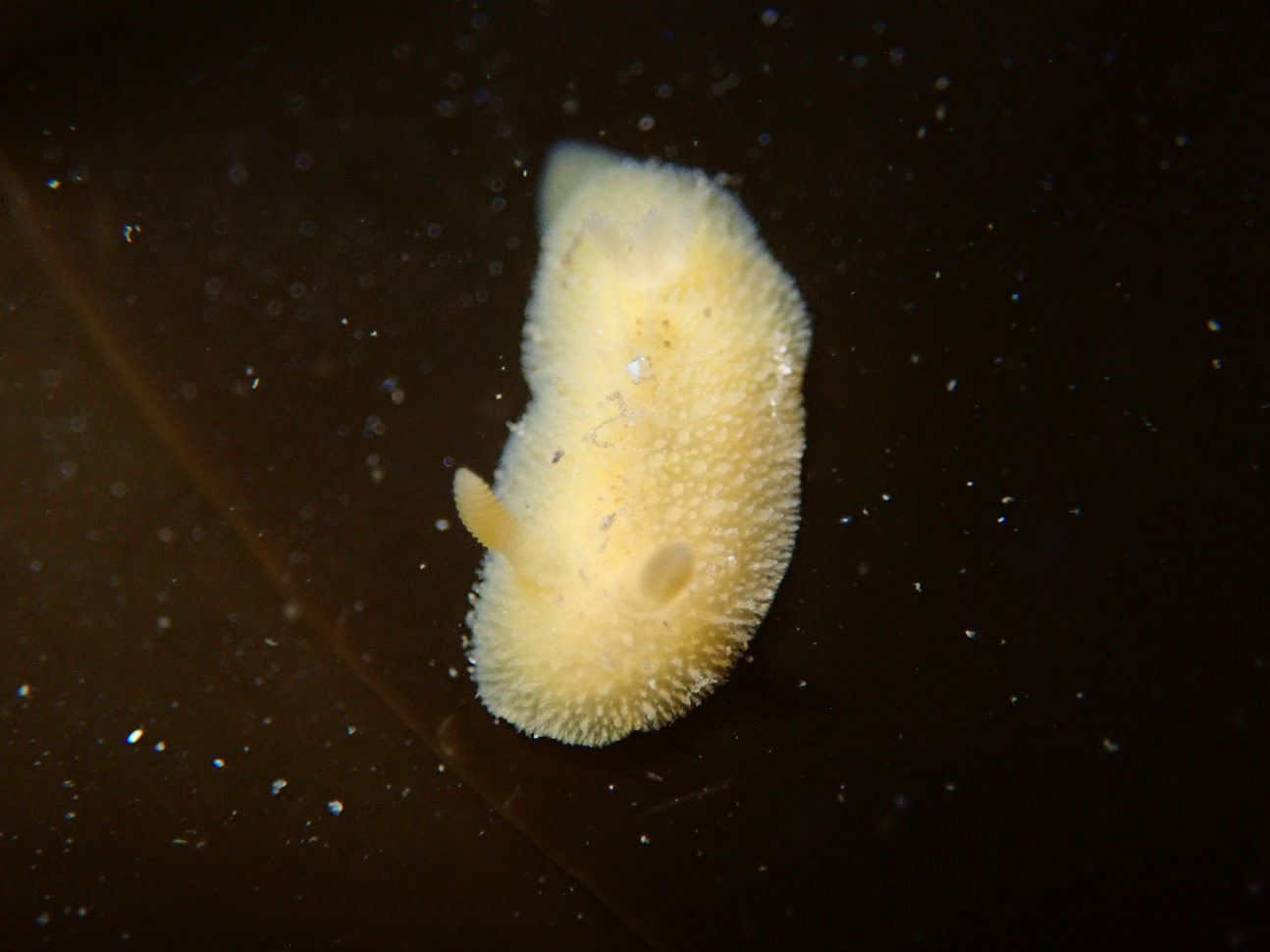

Scientific classification
- Domain: Eukaryota
- Kingdom: Animalia
- Phylum: Mollusca
- Class: Gastropoda
- Order: Nudibranchia
- Family: Discodorididae
- Genus: Thordisa
- Species: T. bimaculata

Binomial name
- Thordisa bimaculata Lance, 1966

= Thordisa bimaculata =

Species of sea slug

Thordisa bimaculata, commonly known as the two-spotted dorid, is a species of sea slug or nudibranch in the family Discodorididae.

== Distribution ==
The two-spotted dorid is found in the eastern Pacific Ocean along the coast of California and Baja California; while northwards shifts in its range are associated with warm ocean anomaly events, most observations are concentrated in the Southern California Bight. It inhabits the rocky intertidal zone, up to depths of 33 m. Like many other nudibranchs, the two-spotted dorid is more commonly seen in the summer.

== Description ==
The base color of the two-spotted dorid varies from white, pale yellow, and orange. Both its common and scientific name refer to the two small concentrations of dark brown spots on its mantle: one behind the rhinophores and the other in front of the gills. These patches of spots may be relatively pale or unpronounced depending on the individual, especially if covered by particles of sand or other small debris. The mantle of the two-spotted dorid is covered in long, bulbous, tapering papillae. The dorsal papillae of another dorid in the same genus -- Thordisa verrucosa -- were discovered to excrete an adhesive substance which holds debris in place, perhaps for camouflage; it is likely the dorsal papillae of the two-spotted dorid serve the same function.

The two-spotted dorid is typically 28 mm (1.1 in) in length. This species appears similar to other dorid nudibranchs in body shape: rounded overall with a squat, pointed posterior, retractable gills. The foot is about 2/3 the width of the body. Near its mouth, the two-spotted dorid has two slender, fingerlike tentacles.

== Ecology ==
=== Diet ===
Like many other dorids, the two-spotted dorid feeds on sponges.

=== Reproduction ===
Like all nudibranchs, the two-spotted dorid is a simultaneous hermaphrodite. While mating, individuals wrestle for dominance, attempting to penetrate and inseminate the other with their penis. The penis of the two-spotted dorid is armored with 7-10 thick, hooked spines in order to aid in this task. Their eggs, or nidosomes, are yellow in color, and, like other sea slugs, are laid in coiled ribbons and attached to a rocky substrate.
