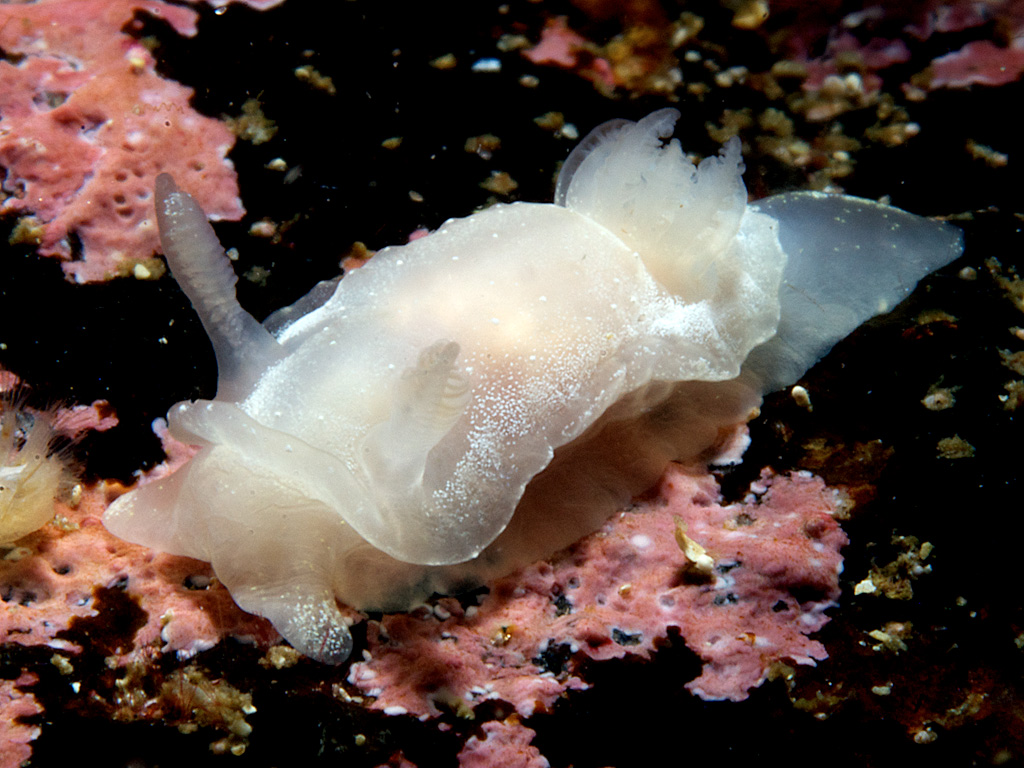
- The nudibranch Okenia nodosa, Gulen Dive Resort, Norway.

Scientific classification
- Kingdom: Animalia
- Phylum: Mollusca
- Class: Gastropoda
- Order: Nudibranchia
- Family: Goniodorididae
- Subfamily: Goniodoridinae
- Genus: Okenia
- Species: O. nodosa

Binomial name
- Okenia nodosa (Montagu, 1808)

Synonyms
- Doris barvicensis Johnston, 1838; Doris elongata Thompson W., 1840; Goniodoris emarginata Forbes, 1840; Doris nodosa Montagu, 1808 (original combination); Goniodoris nodosa (Montagu, 1808)

= Okenia nodosa =

Species of gastropod

Okenia nodosa is a species of sea slug, a dorid nudibranch, a marine gastropod mollusc in the family Goniodorididae.

Formerly the type taxon of Goniodoris, O. nodosa was moved to Okenia following phylogenetic analysis in 2024. The remainder of Goniodoris species did not follow, instead moving to Pelagella on basis of similar morphology.

== Distribution ==
This species was first described from Devon. It has subsequently been reported widely in Britain and Ireland where it is common from the lower shore to moderate depths.

== Description ==
This goniodorid nudibranch is translucent white in colour, with spots of white and yellow. It can reach 27mm in length. Its mantle is reduced and shows its foot.

== Ecology ==
Okenia nodosa feeds on bryozoans of the genus Alcyonidium, including Alcyonidium diaphanum, and, when fully grown, the tunicate Dendrodoa grossularia and Botryllus schlosseri, family Styelidae.
