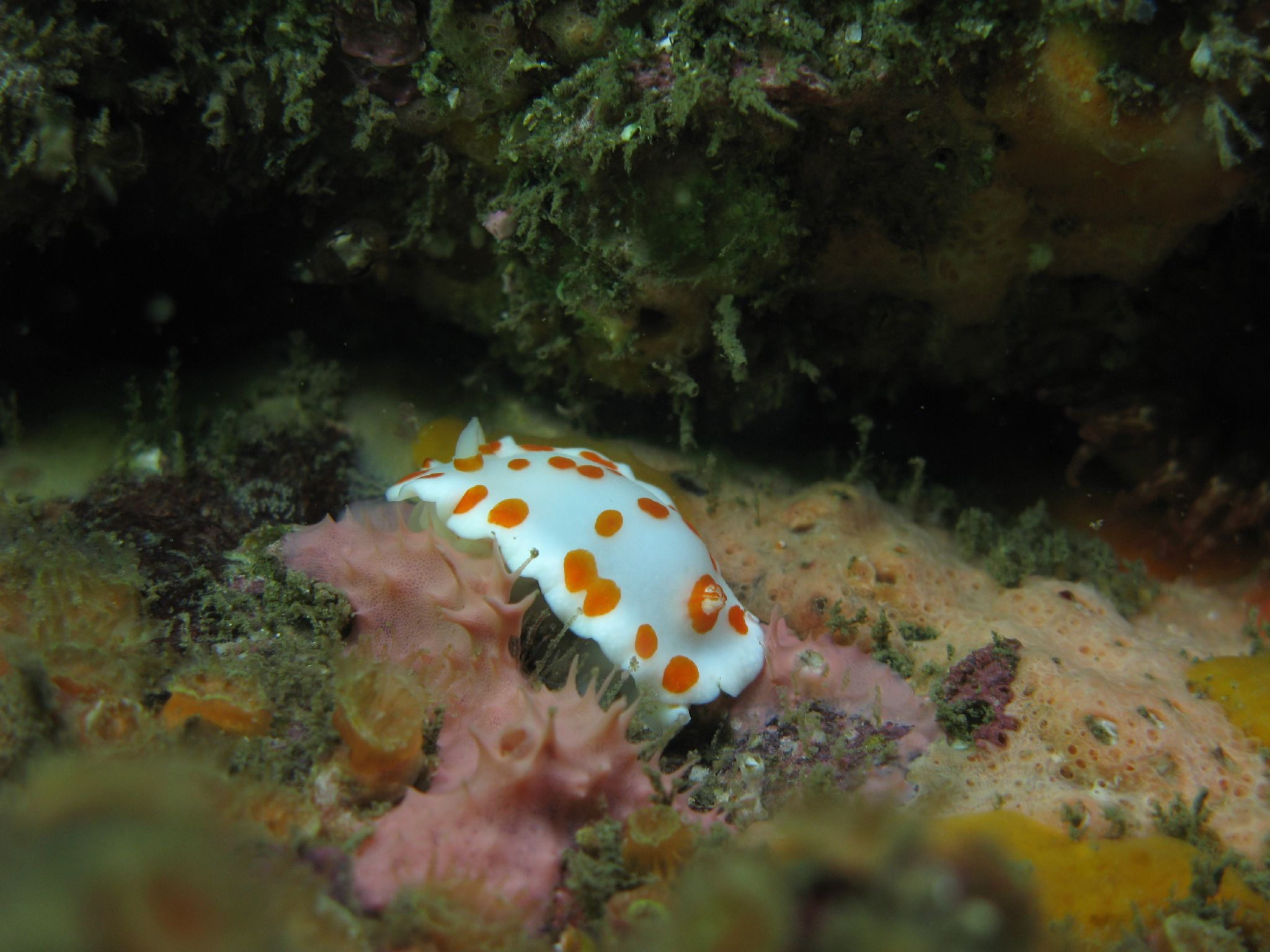

Scientific classification
- Kingdom: Animalia
- Phylum: Mollusca
- Class: Gastropoda
- Order: Nudibranchia
- Family: Chromodorididae
- Genus: Goniobranchus
- Species: G. tasmaniensis

Binomial name
- Goniobranchus tasmaniensis (Bergh, 1905)

Synonyms
- Chromodoris tasmaniensis Bergh, 1905 (basionym); Glossodoris tasmaniensis (Bergh, 1905)

= Goniobranchus tasmaniensis =

Species of gastropod

Goniobranchus tasmaniensis is a species of colourful sea slug, a dorid nudibranch, a marine gastropod mollusc in the family Chromodorididae.

== Distribution ==
This species was described from Tasmania, Australia. It is one of a group of similar red-spotted chromodorids from south-eastern Australia which form a mimicry ring.

== Description ==
Goniobranchus tasmaniensis is a chromodorid nudibranch which has a translucent white mantle with scattered orange or red spots. The edge of the mantle is opaque white and somewhat swollen and ruffled in resting animals. Compare with Goniobranchus splendidus, Goniobranchus hunterae and Goniobranchus daphne which all have similar coloration.

== Ecology ==
This species feeds on the sponge Darwinella gardineri.
