= Cupedora =

Scientific classification
- Kingdom: Animalia
- Phylum: Mollusca
- Class: Gastropoda
- Order: Stylommatophora
- Family: Camaenidae
- Genus: Cupedora; Iredale, 1933

Genus of gastropods

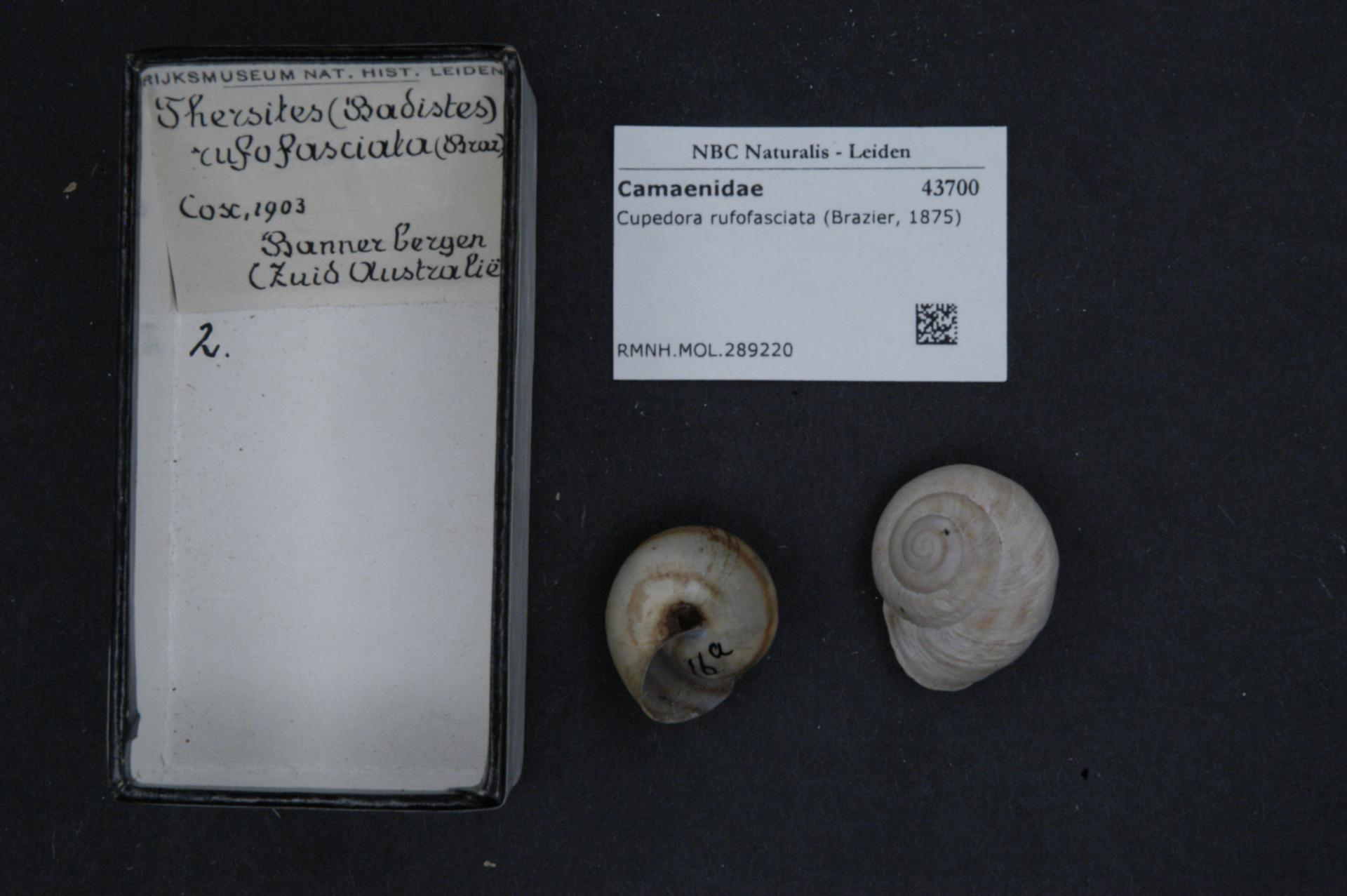
Shells of cupedora rufofascista

Cupedora is a genus of air-breathing land snail, a terrestrial pulmonate gastropod mollusk in the family Camaenidae.

== Species ==
Species within the genus Cupedora include:

- Cupedora broughami
- Cupedora evandaleana
- Cupedora luteofusca
- Cupedora marcidum
- Cupedora nottensis
- Cupedora sutilosa
- Cupedora tomsetti
