= Thordisa harrisi =

Scientific classification
- Kingdom: Animalia
- Phylum: Mollusca
- Class: Gastropoda
- Order: Nudibranchia
- Family: Discodorididae
- Genus: Thordisa
- Species: T. harrisi

Binomial name
- Thordisa harrisi Chan & Gosliner, 2006

Species of gastropod

Thordisa harrisi is a species of sea slug, a dorid nudibranch, shell-less marine opisthobranch gastropod molluscs in the family Discodorididae.
