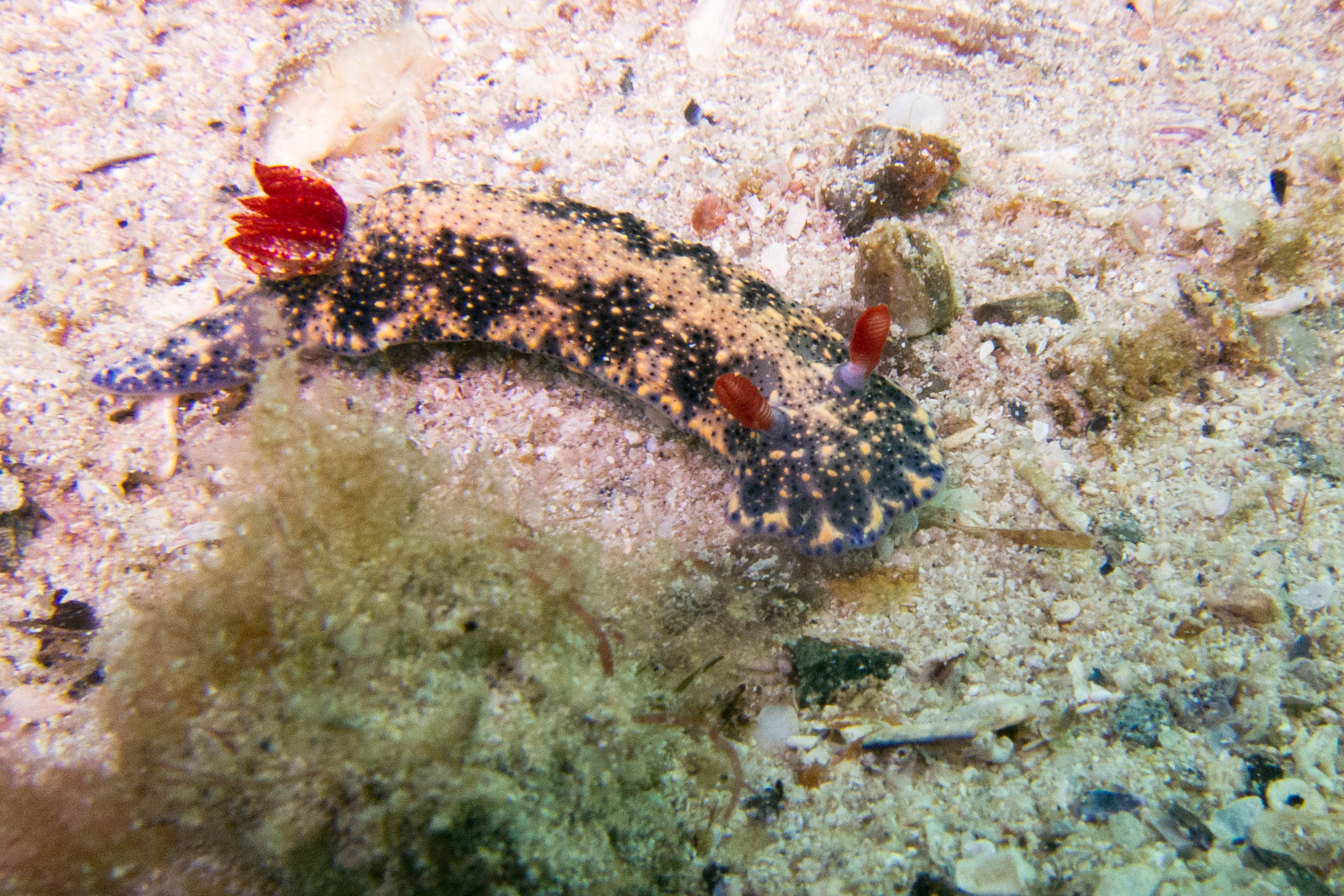

Scientific classification
- Kingdom: Animalia
- Phylum: Mollusca
- Class: Gastropoda
- Order: Nudibranchia
- Family: Chromodorididae
- Genus: Hypselodoris
- Species: H. saintvincentius

Binomial name
- Hypselodoris saintvincentius (Burn, 1962)

= Hypselodoris saintvincentius =

Species of gastropod

Hypselodoris saintvincentius is a species of sea slug or dorid nudibranch, a marine gastropod mollusk in the family Chromodorididae.

== Distribution ==
This nudibranch is known only from Southern and Southwestern Australia.

This species was described from the intertidal zone at Coobowie, west coast of St Vincent Gulf, South Australia 35.044260°S 137.739888°E. It is related to the widespread tropical species Hypselodoris infucata and the similar Australian species Hypselodoris obscura. It has been reported from depths to 12 m and from Western Australia.

== Description ==
Hypselodoris saintvincentius has a dark blue-black body which is covered in hundreds of small black and white spots. There is typically a creamy-white irregular, lined pattern present on its dorsum. The gills and rhinophores are orange, sometimes outlined in white.

This species can reach a total length of at least 40 mm and has been observed feeding on sponges from the genus Dysidea.
