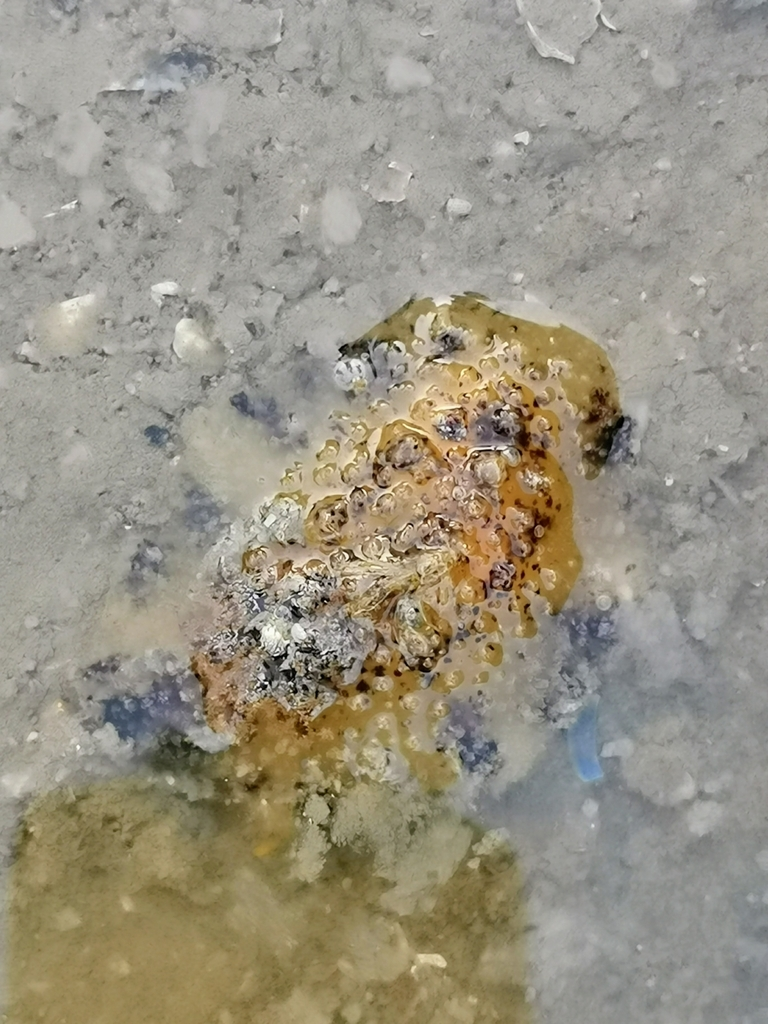

Scientific classification
- Kingdom: Animalia
- Phylum: Mollusca
- Class: Gastropoda
- Order: Nudibranchia
- Family: Discodorididae
- Genus: Thordisa
- Species: T. villosa

Binomial name
- Thordisa villosa (Alder & Hancock, 1864)

= Thordisa villosa =

Species of gastropod

Thordisa villosa is a species of sea slug, a dorid nudibranch, shell-less marine opisthobranch gastropod molluscs in the family Discodorididae.
