= Thordisa lurca =

Scientific classification
- Domain: Eukaryota
- Kingdom: Animalia
- Phylum: Mollusca
- Class: Gastropoda
- Order: Nudibranchia
- Family: Discodorididae
- Genus: Thordisa
- Species: T. lurca

Binomial name
- Thordisa lurca (Ev. Marcus & Er. Marcus, 1967)

Synonyms
- Nuvuca lurca Ev. Marcus & Er. Marcus, 1967

Species of gastropod

Thordisa lurca is a species of sea slug, a dorid nudibranch, shell-less marine opisthobranch gastropod molluscs in the family Discodorididae.

== Distribution ==
This species was described from the Caribbean Sea. It has been reported from Brazil.
