= Cupedora luteofusca =

Conservation status
- Near Threatened (IUCN 2.3)

Scientific classification
- Kingdom: Animalia
- Phylum: Mollusca
- Class: Gastropoda
- Order: Stylommatophora
- Family: Camaenidae
- Genus: Cupedora
- Species: C. luteofusca

Binomial name
- Cupedora luteofusca Cox, 1868

Species of gastropod

Cupedora luteofusca is a species of air-breathing land snail, a terrestrial pulmonate gastropod mollusk in the family Camaenidae. This species is endemic to Australia.
