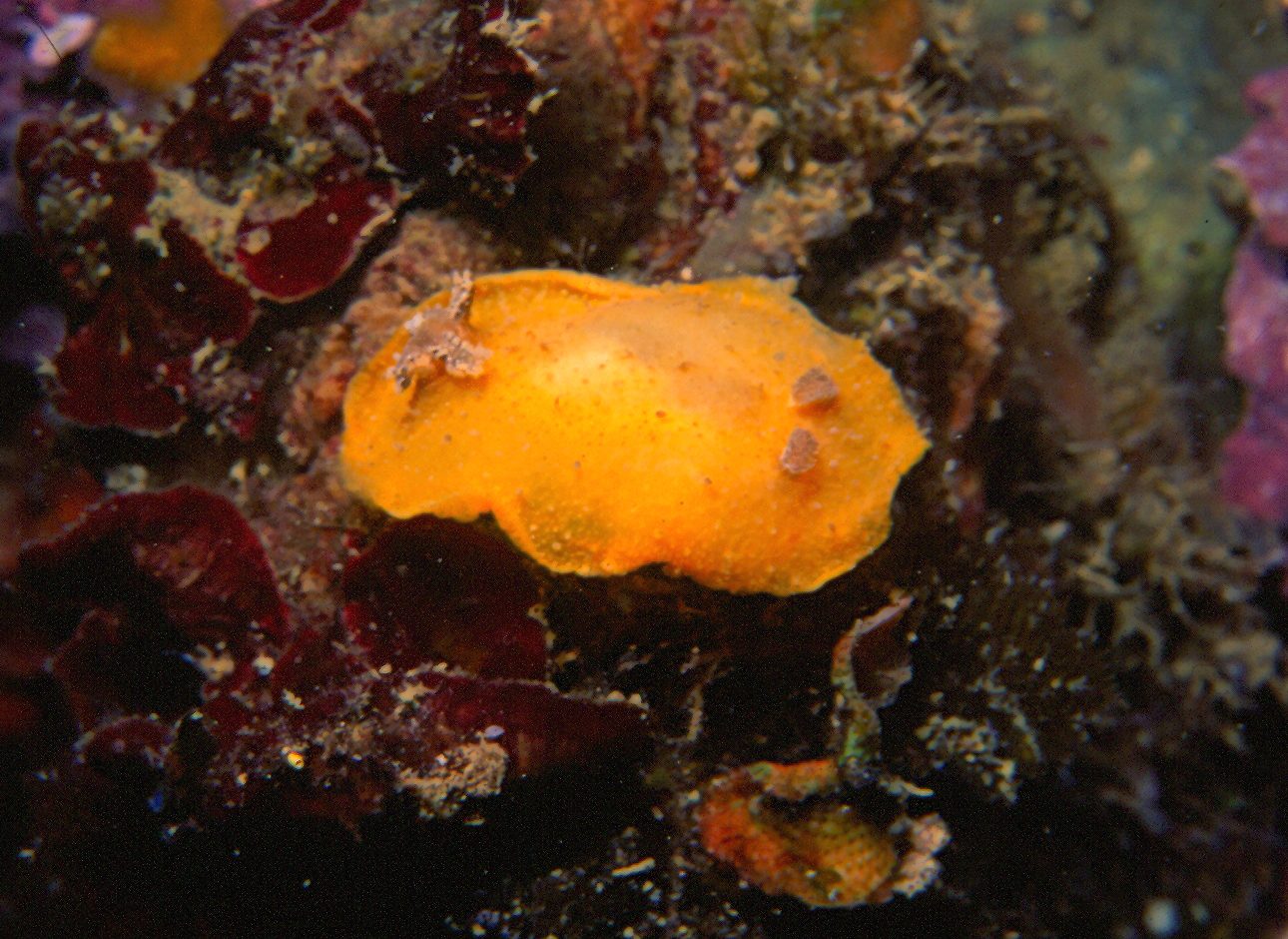
- Thordisa filix

Scientific classification
- Kingdom: Animalia
- Phylum: Mollusca
- Class: Gastropoda
- Order: Nudibranchia
- Family: Discodorididae
- Genus: Thordisa; Bergh, 1877

Synonyms
- Etidoris Ihering, 1886; Nuvuca Er. Marcus & Ev. Marcus, 1967; Pupsikus Er. Marcus & Ev. Marcus, 1970

= Thordisa =

Genus of gastropods

Thordisa is a genus of sea slugs, dorid nudibranchs, shell-less marine gastropod mollusks in the family Discodorididae.

== Species ==
Species in the genus Thordisa include:

- Thordisa aculeata Ortea & Valdés, 1995
- Thordisa albomacula Chan & Gosliner, 2007
- Thordisa aurea Pruvot-Fol, 1951
- Thordisa azmanii Cervera & García-Gómez, 1989
- Thordisa bimaculata Lance, 1966
- Thordisa burnupi Eliot, 1910
- Thordisa diuda Marcus Er., 1955
- Thordisa filix Pruvot-Fol, 1951
- Thordisa harrisi Chan & Gosliner, 2006
- Thordisa hilaris Bergh, 1905
- Thordisa ladislavii (Ihering, 1886)
- Thordisa lurca (Ev. Marcus & Er. Marcus, 1967)
- Thordisa luteola Chan & Gosliner, 2007
- Thordisa nieseni Chan & Gosliner, 2007
- Thordisa oliva Chan & Gosliner, 2007
- Thordisa pallida Bergh, 1884
- Thordisa poplei Edmunds, 2011
- Thordisa rubescens Behrens & Henderson, 1981
- Thordisa sanguinea Baba, 1955
- Thordisa tahala Chan & Gosliner, 2007
- Thordisa verrucosa (Crosse in Angas, 1864)
- Thordisa villosa (Alder & Hancock, 1864)

Species brought into synonymy

- Thordisa crosslandi Eliot, 1903 : synonym of Sebadoris nubilosa (Pease, 1871)
- Thordisa parva Baba, 1938 : synonym of Jorunna parva (Baba, 1938)
- Thordisa sabulosa Burn, 1957 : synonym of Thordisa verrucosa (Crosse in Angas, 1864)
