= Thordisa ladislavii =

Scientific classification
- Kingdom: Animalia
- Phylum: Mollusca
- Class: Gastropoda
- Order: Nudibranchia
- Family: Discodorididae
- Genus: Thordisa
- Species: T. ladislavii

Binomial name
- Thordisa ladislavii (Ihering, 1886)

Synonyms
- Etidoris ladislavii Ihering, 1886

Species of gastropod

Thordisa ladislavii is a species of sea slug, a dorid nudibranch, shell-less marine opisthobranch gastropod molluscs in the family Discodorididae.
