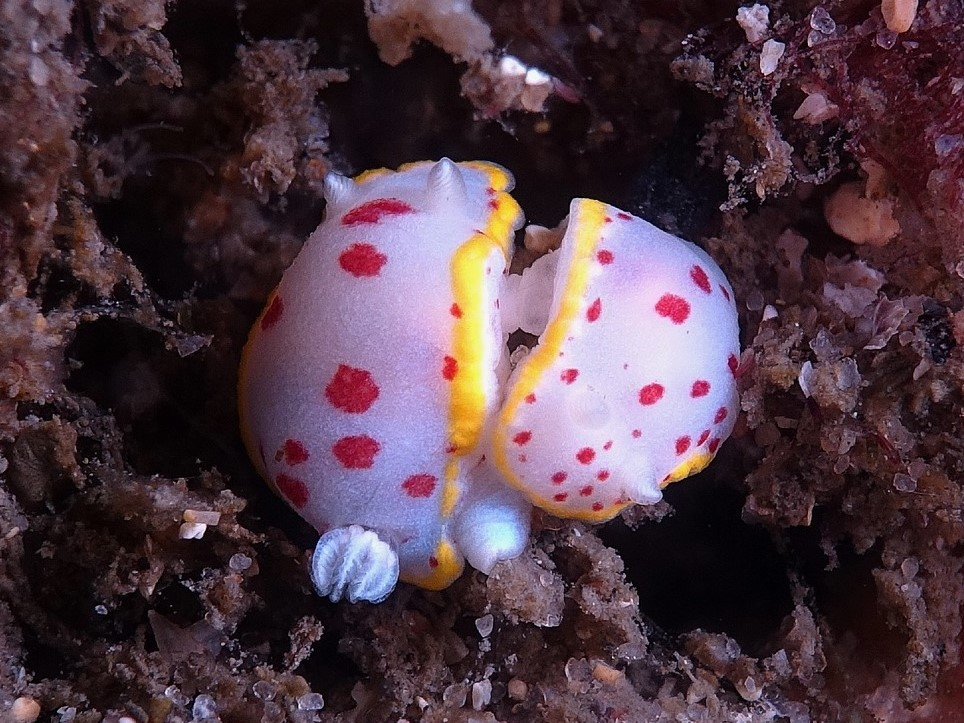

Scientific classification
- Kingdom: Animalia
- Phylum: Mollusca
- Class: Gastropoda
- Order: Nudibranchia
- Family: Chromodorididae
- Genus: Goniobranchus
- Species: G. hunterae

Binomial name
- Goniobranchus hunterae (Rudman, 1983)

Synonyms
- Chromodoris hunterae Rudman, 1983

= Goniobranchus hunterae =

Species of gastropod

Goniobranchus hunterae is a species of colourful sea slug, a dorid nudibranch, a marine gastropod mollusc in the family Chromodorididae.

== Description ==
Goniobranchus hunterae is a chromodorid nudibranch which has a translucent white mantle with scattered red spots. The edge of the mantle is yellow with opaque white glands showing through the skin just inside this region. The rhinophore clubs are translucent with white pigment towards the tip. The gills have opaque white lines on the outer rachis and translucent white leaves. The body reaches a length of 25 mm. Compare with Goniobranchus daphne, Goniobranchus splendidus and Goniobranchus tasmaniensis which all have similar coloration.

== Distribution ==
This species was described from La Perouse, Sydney, New South Wales, Australia. It is one of a group of similar red-spotted chromodorids from south-eastern Australia which form a mimicry ring.
