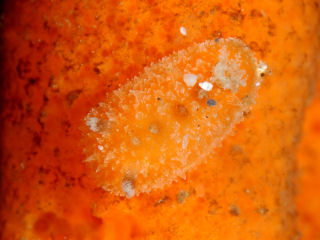
- Thordisa sanguinea

Scientific classification
- Kingdom: Animalia
- Phylum: Mollusca
- Class: Gastropoda
- Order: Nudibranchia
- Family: Discodorididae
- Genus: Thordisa
- Species: T. sanguinea

Binomial name
- Thordisa sanguinea Baba, 1955

= Thordisa sanguinea =

Species of mollusc

Thordisa sanguinea is a species of sea slug, a dorid nudibranch, shell-less marine opisthobranch gastropod molluscs in the family Discodorididae.
