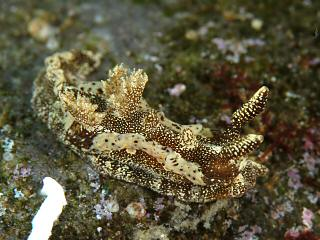
- Pelagella joubini

Scientific classification
- Kingdom: Animalia
- Phylum: Mollusca
- Class: Gastropoda
- Order: Nudibranchia
- Family: Goniodorididae
- Subfamily: Goniodoridinae
- Genus: Pelagella; J. E. Gray, 1850

Type species
- Pelagella castanaea (Alder & Hancock, 1845)

= Pelagella =

Genus of gastropods

Pelagella is a genus of sea slugs, marine gastropod molluscs, in the subfamily Goniodoridinae in the family Goniodorididae.

In 2023, the genus was recovered from synonymy with Goniodoris. In the following year it was found that Goniodoris nodosa, the types species of the genus, should be moved to Okenia. The remainder of Goniodoris species had morphology consistent with Pelagella however, so it was decided that all Goniodoris species except G. nodosa should be transferred to Pelagella, while Goniodoris be officially regarded as a synonym of Okenia.

== Species ==
Species currently within Pelagella include:

- Pelagella albopunctata Paz-Sedano, Smirnoff, Gosliner & Pola, 2023
- Pelagella aspersa (Alder & Hancock, 1864)
- Pelagella balanoyensis Paz-Sedano, Smirnoff, Gosliner & Pola, 2023
- Pelagella barroisi (Vayssière, 1901)
- Pelagella castanea (Alder & Hancock, 1845)
- Pelagella citrina (Alder & Hancock, 1864)
- Pelagella felis (Baba, 1949)
- Pelagella joubini (Risbec, 1928)
- Pelagella kolabana (Winckworth, 1946)
- Pelagella longicornis Paz-Sedano, Smirnoff, Gosliner & Pola, 2023
- Pelagella meracula (Burn, 1958)
- Pelagella mercurialis (Macnae, 1958)
- Pelagella mimula (Er. Marcus, 1955)
- Pelagella modesta (Alder & Hancock, 1864)
- Pelagella noregna (Ortea & Moro, 2021)
- Pelagella ovata (Barnard, 1934)
- Pelagella petiti (Crosse, 1875)
- Pelagella punctata (Bergh, 1905)
- Pelagella rubrobranchiata Paz-Sedano, Smirnoff, Gosliner & Pola, 2023
- Pelagella scottjohnsoni Paz-Sedano, Smirnoff, Gosliner & Pola, 2023
- Pelagella sugashimae (Baba, 1960)
- Pelagella violacea (Risbec, 1928)
- Pelagella vitrea Paz-Sedano, Smirnoff, Gosliner & Pola, 2023

Synonyms:

- Pelagella pareti (Vérany, 1846) : synonym of Pelagella castanea (Alder & Hancock, 1845)
