= Pelagella petiti =

Scientific classification
- Kingdom: Animalia
- Phylum: Mollusca
- Class: Gastropoda
- Order: Nudibranchia
- Family: Goniodorididae
- Genus: Goniodoris
- Species: G. petiti

Binomial name
- Goniodoris petiti (Crosse, 1875)

Synonyms
- Goniodoris petiti Crosse, 1875

Species of gastropod

Goniodoris petiti is a species of sea slug, a dorid nudibranch, a marine gastropod mollusc in the family Goniodorididae.

== Eytmology ==
This species was named for "Mr. E. Petit", who shared with Crosse the mollusks he collected during his stay in Baie de Sud.

== Distribution ==
G. petiti was originally described from a single specimen Noumea, New Caledonia.

== Description ==
The colouration is described as a rosy white with the majority of the notum tinted a carmine red. This red becomes more pigmented in the middle of the notum, the tentacles, and the gills. The dorsal tentacles have oblique striations, swollen in the middle and tips blunted. The gills are situated close to the posterior of the notum.
