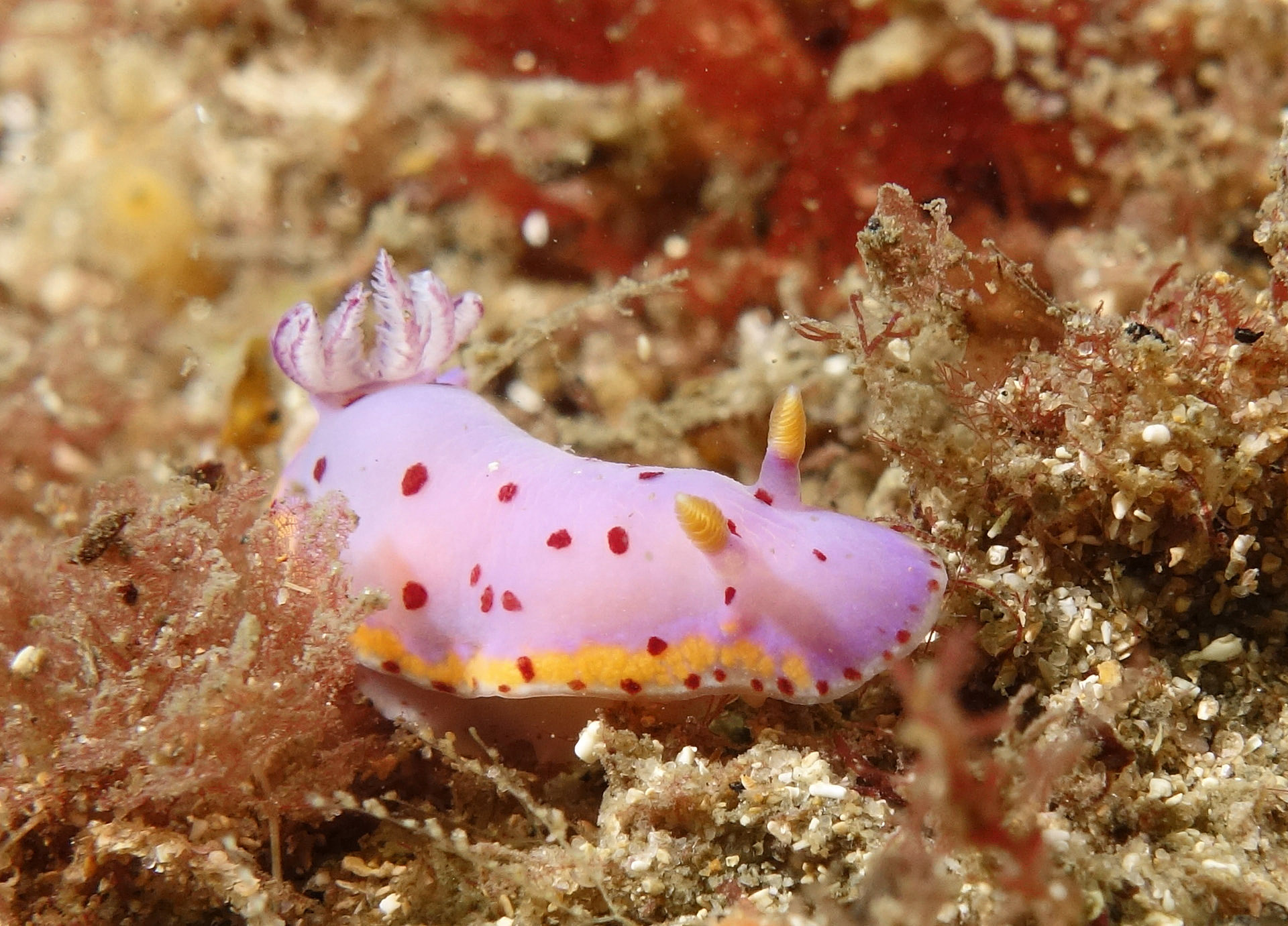

Scientific classification
- Kingdom: Animalia
- Phylum: Mollusca
- Class: Gastropoda
- Order: Nudibranchia
- Family: Chromodorididae
- Genus: Goniobranchus
- Species: G. loringi

Binomial name
- Goniobranchus loringi (Angas, 1864)

Synonyms
- Chromodoris loringi (Angas, 1864); Goniodoris loringi Angas, 1864 (basionym)

= Goniobranchus loringi =

Species of gastropod

Goniobranchus loringi is a species of colourful sea slug, a dorid nudibranch, a marine gastropod mollusc in the family Chromodorididae. This species was transferred from Chromodoris to Goniobranchus in 2012.

== Distribution ==
This species was described from Port Jackson, Australia. It is endemic to south-eastern Australia.
