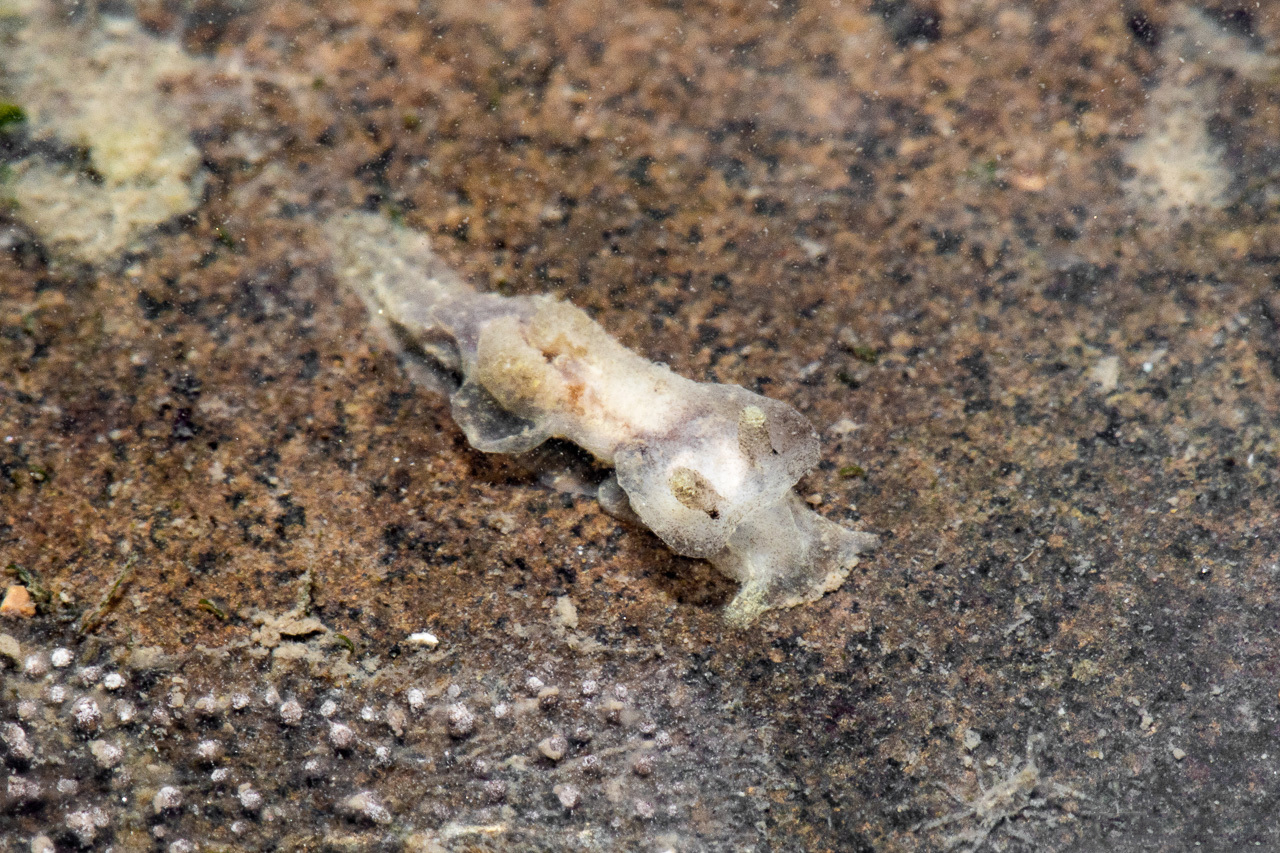
- Photographed in Mumbai in February 2019

Scientific classification
- Kingdom: Animalia
- Phylum: Mollusca
- Class: Gastropoda
- Order: Nudibranchia
- Family: Goniodorididae
- Subfamily: Goniodoridinae
- Genus: Pelagella
- Species: P. kolabana

Binomial name
- Pelagella kolabana (Winckworth, 1946)

Synonyms
- Goniodoris kolabana Winckworth, 1946

= Pelagella kolabana =

Species of gastropod

Pelagella kolabana is a species of sea slug, a dorid nudibranch, a marine gastropod mollusc in the family Goniodorididae.

== Distribution ==
This species was first described from Bombay, India.
