= Pelagella mimula =

Scientific classification
- Kingdom: Animalia
- Phylum: Mollusca
- Class: Gastropoda
- Order: Nudibranchia
- Family: Goniodorididae
- Subfamily: Goniodoridinae
- Genus: Pelagella
- Species: P. mimula

Binomial name
- Pelagella mimula (Er. Marcus, 1955)

Synonyms
- Goniodoris mimula Er. Marcus, 1955

Species of gastropod

Pelagella mimula is a species of sea slug, a dorid nudibranch, a marine gastropod mollusc in the family Goniodorididae.

== Description ==
The body grows to a length of 10 mm.

== Distribution ==
This marine species was first described from Brazil. It also occurs in the Caribbean Sea off Mexico.
