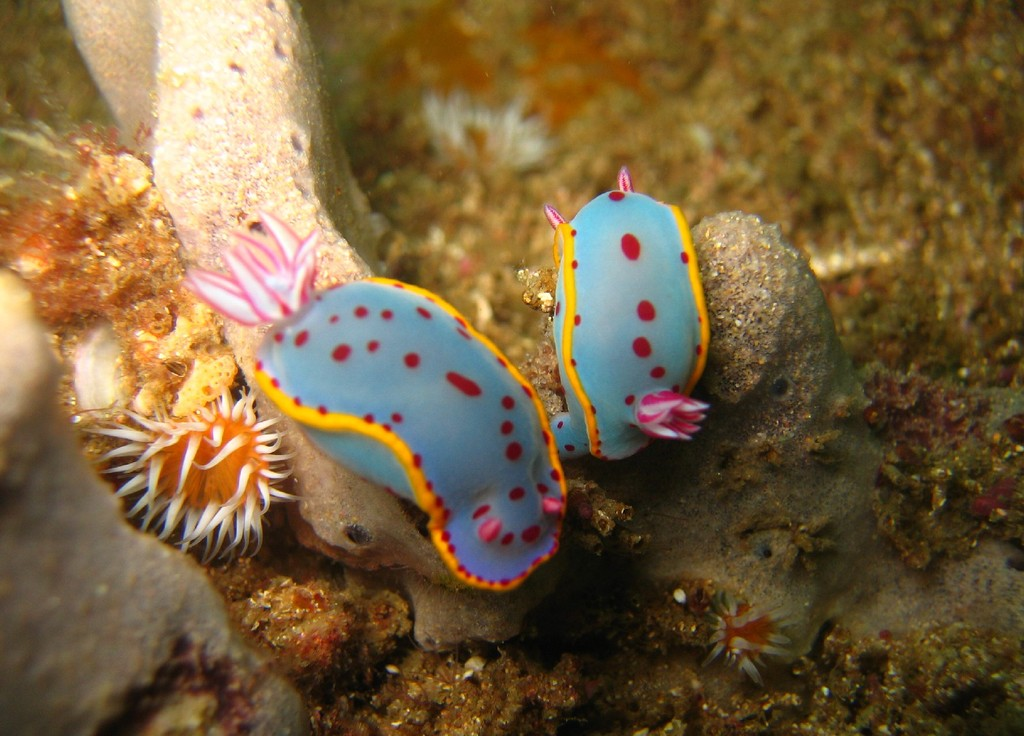
- A pair of Hypselodoris bennetti

Scientific classification
- Kingdom: Animalia
- Phylum: Mollusca
- Class: Gastropoda
- Order: Nudibranchia
- Family: Chromodorididae
- Genus: Hypselodoris
- Species: H. bennetti

Binomial name
- Hypselodoris bennetti (Angas, 1864)

Synonyms
- Chromodoris daphne (Angas, 1864); Glossodoris daphne (Angas, 1864); Goniodoris daphne Angas, 1864 (basionym)

= Hypselodoris bennetti =

Species of gastropod

Hypselodoris bennetti is a species of colourful sea slug or dorid nudibranch, a marine gastropod mollusc in the family Chromodorididae.

== Distribution ==
This nudibranch is found in Southeastern Australia from Queensland to Victoria.

== Description ==
H. bennetti has a translucent white body which may have a blue, pink or purple hue, and a bright yellow mantle edge. There are red spots on its under body and dorsum running longitudinally along the centre and at the mantle edge. Some animals have yellow spots. The gills and rhinophores are white, outlined with pink or red. This species can reach a total length of at least 50 mm and has been observed feeding on sponges from the genus Psammocinia.

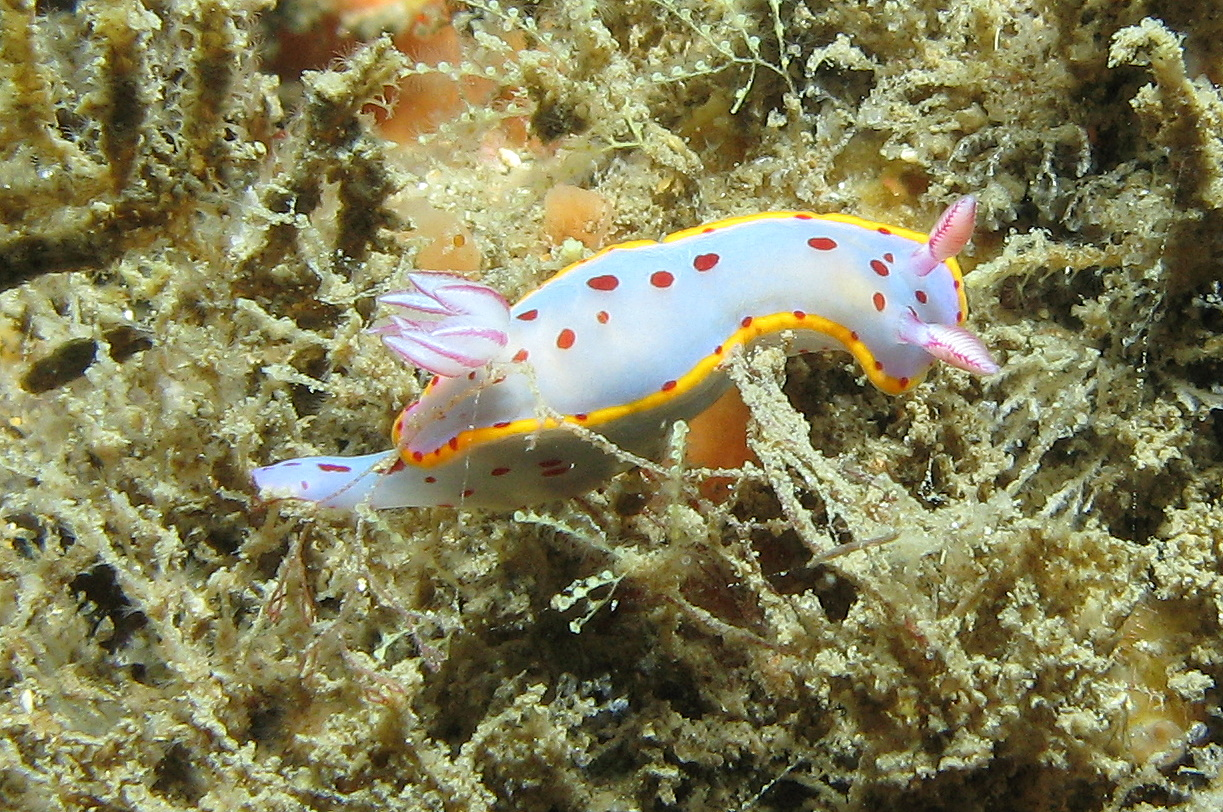
Hypselodoris bennetti

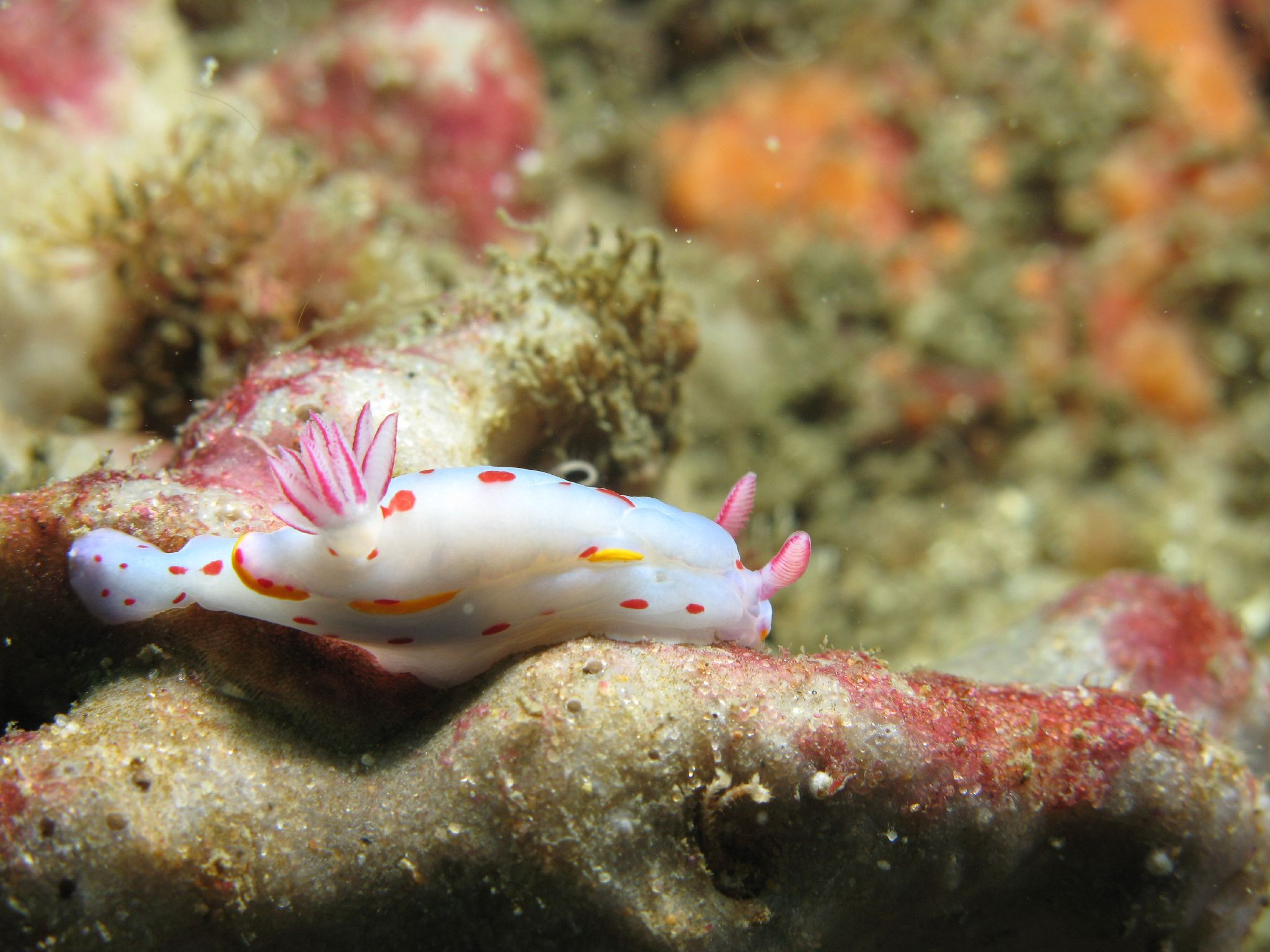
Hypselodoris bennetti
