= Pelagella sugashimae =

Scientific classification
- Kingdom: Animalia
- Phylum: Mollusca
- Class: Gastropoda
- Order: Nudibranchia
- Family: Goniodorididae
- Subfamily: Goniodoridinae
- Genus: Pelagella
- Species: P. sugashimae

Binomial name
- Pelagella sugashimae (Baba, 1960)

Synonyms
- Goniodoris sugashimae Baba, 1960

Species of gastropod

Pelagella sugashimae is a species of sea slug, a dorid nudibranch, a marine gastropod mollusc in the family Goniodorididae.

== Etymology ==
It is named for the location of the earliest recorded specimen, onshore the island of Sugashima. Its Japanese name in vernacular Katakana is Sugashima-koneko-umiushi (スガ シマ コネコ ウミウシ).

== Distribution ==
This species was first described from Japan. Noted locales of collected specimens include Sugashima, Osaka Bay, and in the Inland Sea of Seto.

== Description ==
The colouration of the body, gills, and rhinophores are yellowish-brown. The body is remarked as pale with occasional dark patches, and clusters of white spots on the back and sides. The notum and sides of the animal are smooth except for the heavily waved median crest and 3-5 knobs on either side of it.
