= Pelagella ovata =

Scientific classification
- Kingdom: Animalia
- Phylum: Mollusca
- Class: Gastropoda
- Order: Nudibranchia
- Family: Goniodorididae
- Subfamily: Goniodoridinae
- Genus: Pelagella
- Species: P. ovata

Binomial name
- Pelagella ovata (Barnard, 1934)

Synonyms
- Goniodoris ovata Barnard, 1934

Species of gastropod

Pelagella ovata is a species of sea slug, a dorid nudibranch, a marine gastropod mollusc in the family Goniodorididae.

== Distribution ==
This species was first described from South Africa.

== Ecology ==
Pelagella ovata probably feeds on bryozoans or colonial ascidians but the diet is apparently not yet determined.
