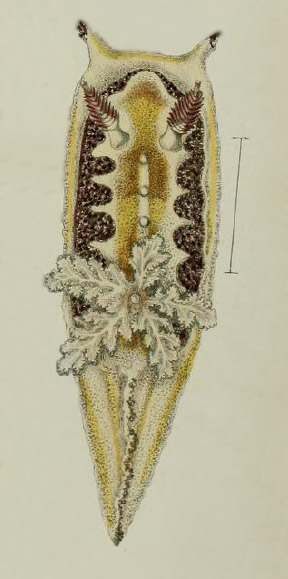
- Pelagella citrina, Alder J. & Hancock A. 1864, pl. 32, fig.1

Scientific classification
- Kingdom: Animalia
- Phylum: Mollusca
- Class: Gastropoda
- Order: Nudibranchia
- Family: Goniodorididae
- Subfamily: Goniodoridinae
- Genus: Pelagella
- Species: P. citrina

Binomial name
- Pelagella citrina (Alder & A. Hancock, 1864)

Synonyms
- Goniodoris citrina Alder & Hancock, 1864

= Pelagella citrina =

Species of gastropod

Pelagella citrina is a species of sea slug, a dorid nudibranch, a marine gastropod mollusc in the family Goniodorididae.

== Distribution ==
This species was first described from India. It was amongst a collection of specimens given to Alder and Hancock for description by Walter Elliot. Elliot describes the collection localities as follows:

“Waltair is a suburb of the town of Vizagapatam, the capital of a province of the same name, one of the Northern Circars. The coast south of Vizagapatam is flat and sandy, with a heavy surf, which is unfavourable to the existence of naked Mollusks, but the whole of the coast of Vizagapatam is rocky, and sometimes precipitous, abounding in bays filled with rock and shingle, amongst which the delicate forms of the creatures you have been describing find shelter. Immediately to the north of Waltair is one of these bays, called Lawson's Bay, in which a large proportion of the specimens were found; but I employed men to search along a more extended line, both north and south of the bay. Most of the species were taken between tide-marks, and only one or two in deep water."

== Description ==
The original description reads:

Body oblong-ovate, broad in front and tapering to a point behind, lemon-coloured, with the processes tipped with purple-brown. Cloak largely developed, and produced at the sides into about seven rounded lobes reflected upwards and densely freckled with purple-brown; posteriorly the pallial margin appears to terminate in a well-produced point on each side, but an indistinct ridge converges from thence to a fringed keel tipped with purple-brown, which runs down to the tail: the rest of the cloak is pale lemon-yellow, darker towards the centre, where there is a slightly elevated ridge bearing obtuse points. Dorsal tentacles clavate and strongly laminated; the laminae and tips of a purple-brown colour. Head not much produced, very broad, with two shortish, flattened tentacular processes, somewhat pointed, and tipped with purple-brown. Branchial plumes five, large, tri-pinnate, yellow, marked on the under surface with purple-brown, closely surrounding the anus, the two posterior plumes rising from the roots of the lateral pair. Foot broad and ample, of an ovate form, truncated in front, and produced into a point behind. Length upwards of an inch. Tongue as in G. nodosa, very minute; the sides of the spines are extremely minutely denticulated: no spinous collar was observed.

== Ecology ==
Goniodoris citrina probably feeds on bryozoans or colonial ascidians, but the diet is apparently not yet determined.
