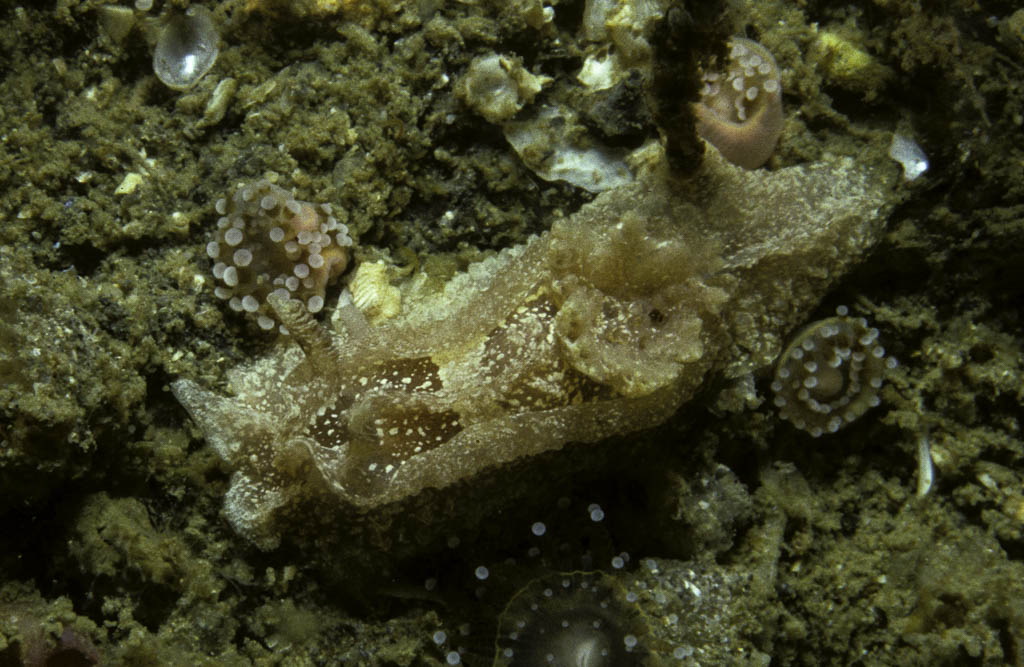
- Aranmore, Aran Islands, Co Galway, Ireland.

Scientific classification
- Kingdom: Animalia
- Phylum: Mollusca
- Class: Gastropoda
- Order: Nudibranchia
- Family: Goniodorididae
- Subfamily: Goniodoridinae
- Genus: Pelagella
- Species: P. castanea

Binomial name
- Pelagella castanea (Alder & A. Hancock, 1845)

Synonyms
- Doris pareti Vérany, 1846; Goniodoris brunnea Macnae, 1958; Goniodoris castanea Alder & Hancock, 1845; Goniodoris castanea var. pallida Dautzenberg & Durouchoux, 1900; Pelagella pareti (Vérany, 1846)

= Pelagella castanea =

Species of gastropod

Pelagella castanea is a species of sea slug, a dorid nudibranch, a marine gastropod mollusc in the family Goniodorididae.

It is the type species of the genus Pelagella.

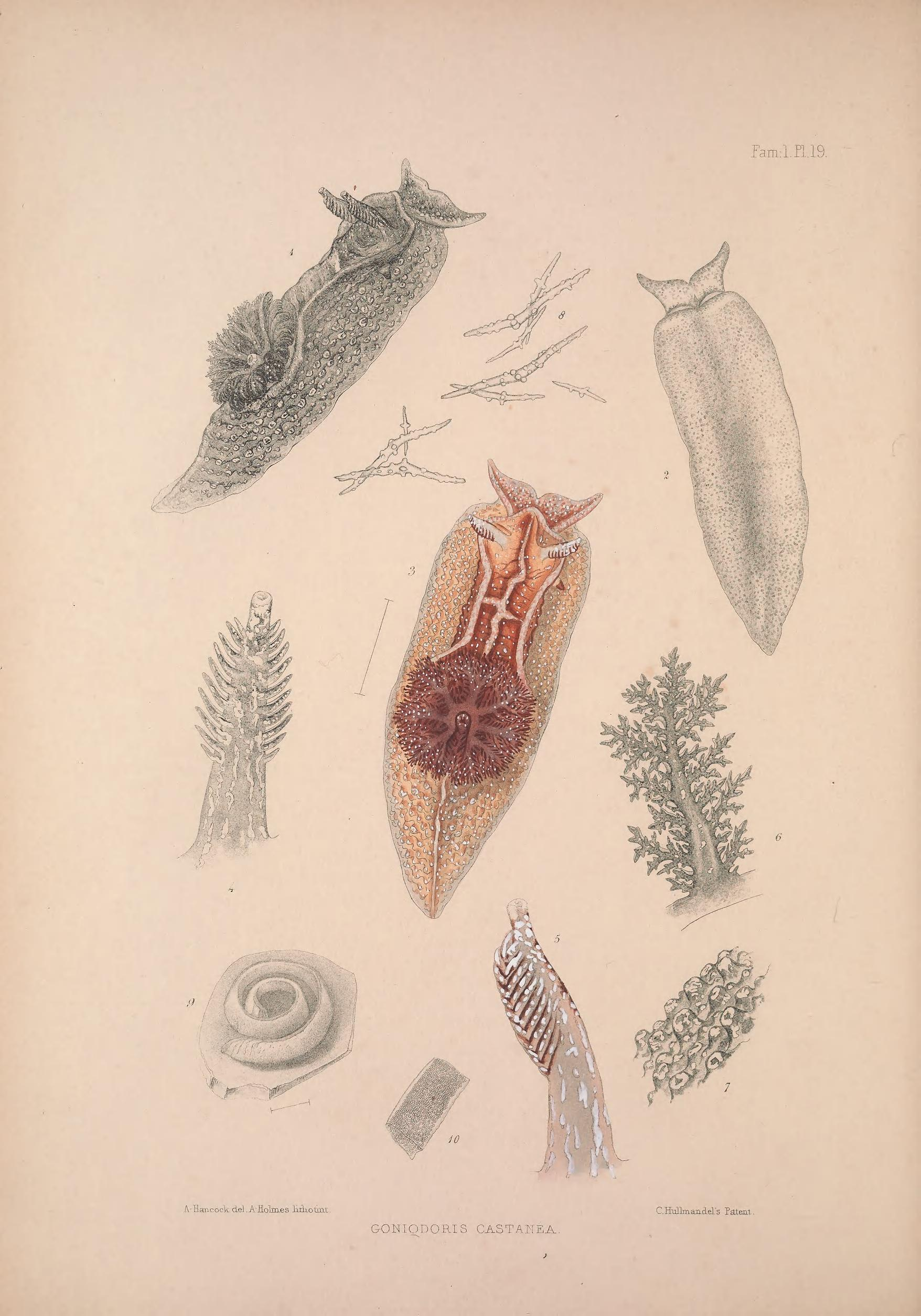
Plate from A monograph of the British nudibranchiate Mollusca illustrating Pelagella castanea

== Distribution ==
This species was first described from Salcombe Estuary, Devon. It has subsequently been reported widely in Britain and Ireland and from Norway to the Mediterranean Sea.

== Description ==
This goniodorid nudibranch is variable in colour, usually red-brown or dark purple but also bright red. Most individuals have scattered irregular small patches of white or grey all over the body.

Its body length is usually 15 mm. The maximum recorded body length is 38 mm.

== Ecology ==
Pelagella castanea feeds on tunicates of the genera Botryllus and Botrylloides, family Botryllidae.
