= George French Angas =

English explorer, naturalist and painter who emigrated to Australia

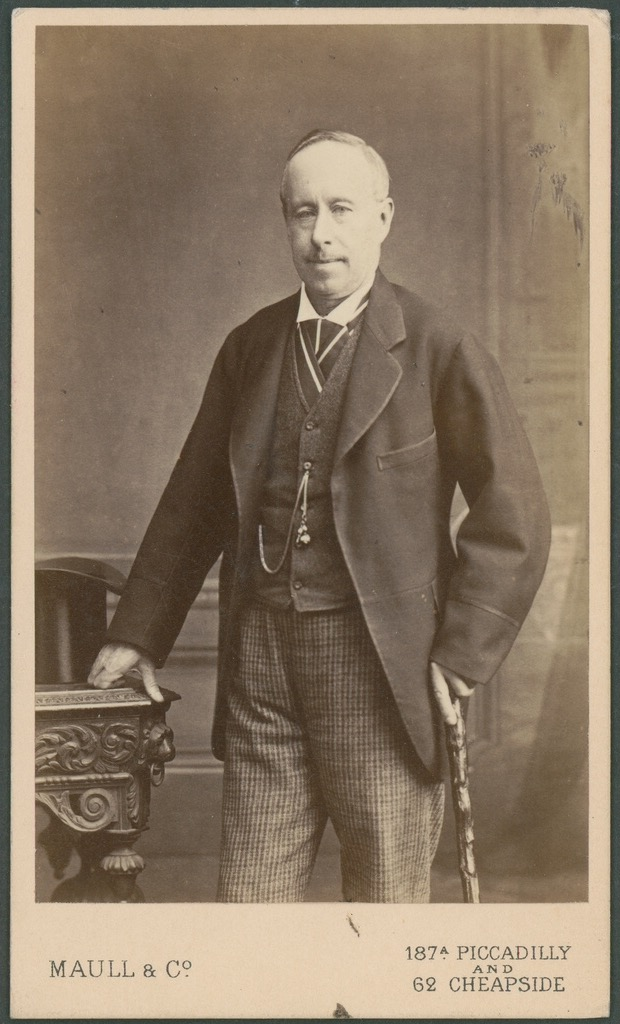
- George French Angas, c. 1870 (by Maull & Co.)
- Born: George French Angas; 25 April 1822; Newcastle upon Tyne
- Died: 4 October 1886 (aged 64); London
- Parent: George Fife Angas
- Relatives: Sarah Lindsay Evans and John Howard Angas (siblings)

George French Angas (25 April 1822 – 4 October 1886), also known as G.F.A., was an English explorer, naturalist, painter and poet who emigrated to Australia. His paintings are held in a number of important Australian public art collections. He was the eldest son of George Fife Angas, who was prominent in the early days of the colonisation of South Australia.

== Biography ==
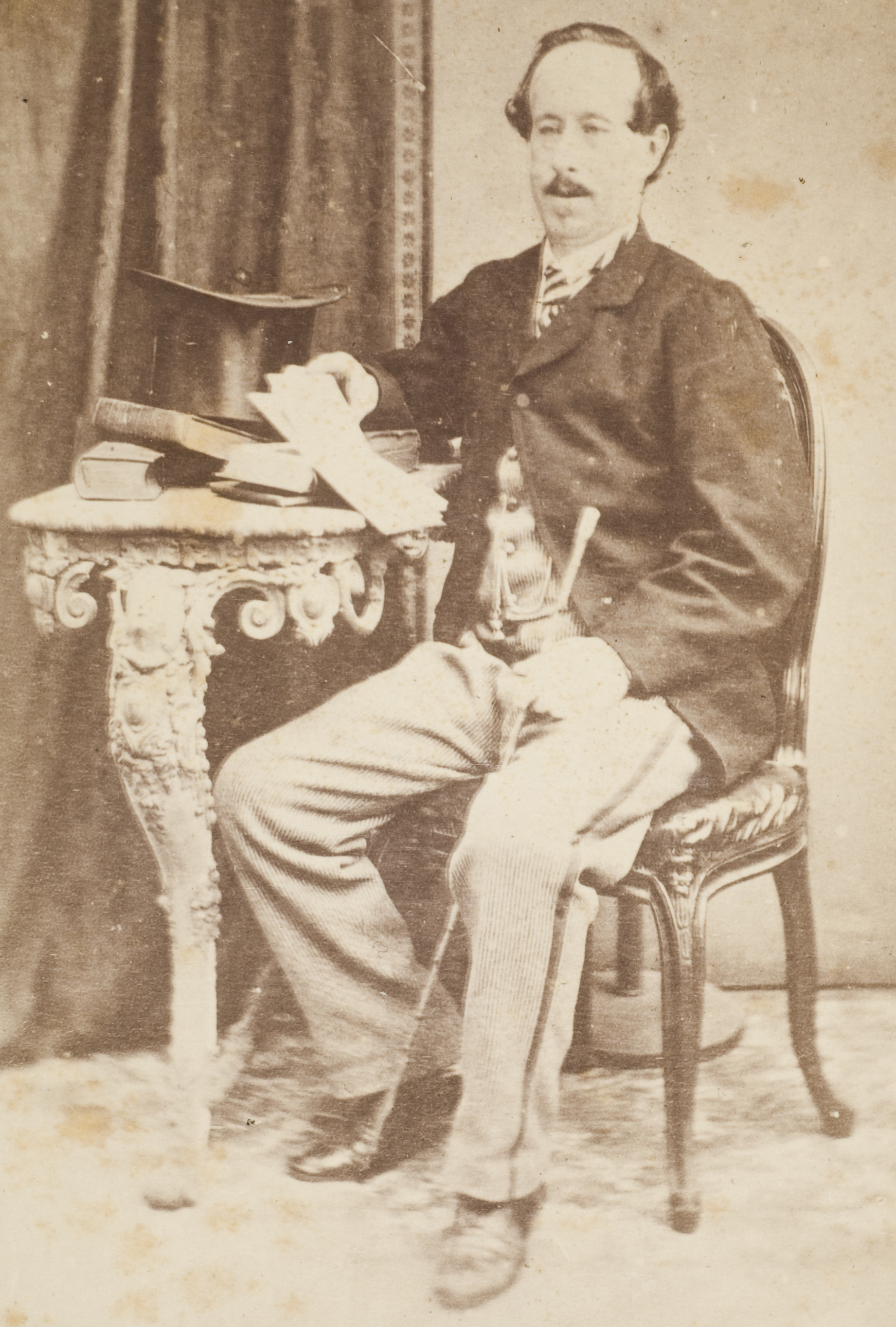
Studio Portrait of George French Angas, ca. 1865

He was born in Newcastle upon Tyne, England, the eldest son of George Fife Angas, prominent in the establishment of the new colony of South Australia. Despite showing remarkable talent in drawing, he was placed in a London business house by his father. He left on a tour of Europe and in 1842 published his first book, Rambles in Malta and Sicily. As a result of this experience, he turned his back on the world of commerce, and directed his training towards a study of natural history, anatomical drawing and lithography. Embarking on his travels, he was soon to find his acquired skills extremely useful.

Angas painted some of the earliest views of South Australia. Arriving in Adelaide in January 1844, he joined Sir George Grey on an expedition into the interior. He soon began an extensive series of journeys to the Murray River lakes, Barossa Valley, Fleurieu Peninsula and the South East, presenting his impressions of the newly established colony – its inhabitants, landscape, and its flora and fauna (flowers, plants and stuff). Following a trip to New Zealand he returned to South Australia in 1845 and travelled to Port Lincoln. In the following year, 1846, he returned for a short while to England, accompanied by a young Māori man, Hemi Pomara, who was exhibited alongside Angas's paintings at the Egyptian Hall in London.

Angas' next journey in 1846 was to South Africa, where he spent two years in Natal and the Cape, working on a series of drawings and watercolours which were published in 1849 as The Kafirs Illustrated. In this book were views of Cape Town, Durban, Wynberg, Genadendal, Paarl and Somerset West, and plates depicting the local ethnic groups such as the Khoikhoi (then referred to as Hottentots), Cape Malays and Zulus.

Angas married Alicia Mary Moran in 1849, the marriage producing four daughters.

In 1853 Angas was appointed to a position at the Australian Museum in Sydney, eventually becoming Director and staying a total of seven years. Angas was in Sydney when gold was first discovered near Bathurst, New South Wales. Travelling there to record the gold diggings he executed a number of drawings of the scenes that he found. These were published in Sydney and subsequently in London. Angas was represented at the 1855 Paris exposition with five other Australian artists including Conrad Martens, Frederick Terry and Adelaide Ironside, the first time Australian artists had been represented at a major overseas display. Angas returned to South Australia in 1860, and finally went back to England in 1863. Angas published several books on Australia and Polynesia as well as illustrating accounts of exploration by John McDouall Stuart and John Forrest, and contributed significantly to conchology with his descriptions and illustrations.

Angas died in London on 8 October 1886.

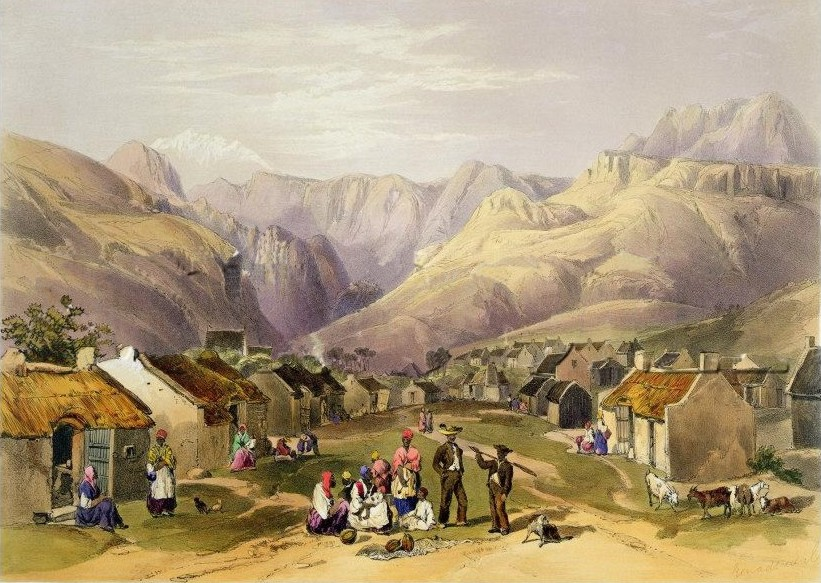
Genadendal Mission Station, South Africa (c. 1849)

== Collections and legacy ==
The African antelope, nyala (Tragelaphus angasii), was named angasii in his honour.

Many of Angas's original watercolours are held in National Library of Australia, as well as in a number of South Australian institutions: Art Gallery of South Australia; University of Adelaide; South Australian Museum; and Royal Geographical Society of South Australia. The State Library of New South Wales has four letters written by Angas – the first is addressed to his publisher, Joseph Hogarth, and is dated 31 January 1848, requesting that two drawings be released to the lithographer James William Giles (1801–1870), and for an advance in payment. The second, dated 28 July 1849 discusses problems experienced by overseas subscribers in the delivery of Kafirs Illustrated. The third letter instructs the publisher to send a plate from his sister's copy of Kafirs to the bookbinder, Mr Proudfoot, in George Street. The final, dated 10 February 1875 is addressed to Stephen William Silver (1819–1905), the London shipping merchant and book collector, and deals with matters relating to the Zoological Society and the Royal Geographical Society.

From August to late November 2020, the State Library of South Australia exhibited his 1848 folio South Australia illustrated, which is also available online.

== Publications ==
- A Catalogue of paintings by George French Angas, illustrative of the natives and scenery of New Zealand and South Australia: also sketches in Brazil, Cape Verde Islands, New South Wales, &c. &c. (London?: s.n., 1846).
- George French Angas, South Australia illustrated (London: Thomas M'Lean, 1847).
- George French Angas, The New Zealanders illustrated (London: Thomas M'Lean, 1847).
- George French Angas, The Kafirs illustrated in a series of drawings taken among the Amazulu, Amaponda and Amakosa tribes (London: J. Hogarth, 1849).
- George French Angas, Six views of the gold field of Ophir, at Summerhill and Lewis Ponds Creeks (Sydney: Woolcott and Clarke, 1851).
- George French Angas, Australia: a popular account of its physical features, inhabitants and productions, with the history of its colonization (London: Society for Promoting Christian Knowledge, 1865?).
- George French Angas, Polynesia: a popular description of the physical features, inhabitants, natural history and productions of the islands of the Pacific. With an account of their discovery, and of the progress of civilization and christianity amongst them (London: Society for Promoting Christian Knowledge, 1866?).
- 1846 South Australia
- 1847 Savage life and scenes in Australia and New Zealand : being an artist's impressions of countries and people at the antipodes (Lithographers Day & Haghe, Publishers Smith Elders & Co., Adelaide)
- 1849 The Kafirs Illustrated (London: Hogarth Press)
- 1849 Description of the Barossa Range and Its Neighbourhood in South Australia (Smith, Elder & Co., London)
- 1864 Description d'espèces nouvelles appartenant à plusieurs genres de Mollusques Nudibranches des environs de Port-Jackson (Nouvelle-Galles du Sud), accompagnée de dessins faits d'après nature. Journal de Conchyliologie, series 3, 12:43-70, pls. 4–6.
- 1874 The Wreck of the Admella, and other Poems, (Sampson Low, London).

== Nudibranch molluscs described by Angas ==
Species of nudibranch described by Angas include:

- Austraeolis ornata (Angas, 1864)
- Baeolidia macleayi (Angas, 1864)
- Bornella hermanni Angas, 1864
- Doriopsilla carneola (Angas, 1864)
- Doris chrysoderma Angas, 1864
- Facelina newcombi (Angas, 1864)
- Goniobranchus daphne (Angas, 1864)
- Goniobranchus loringi (Angas, 1864)
- Goniobranchus splendidus (Angas, 1864)
- Hoplodoris nodulosa (Angas, 1864)
- Hypselodoris bennetti (Angas, 1864)
- Jorunna pantherina (Angas, 1864)
- Kaloplocamus yatesi (Angas, 1864)
- Madrella sanguinea (Angas, 1864)
- Melibe australis Angas, 1864
- Mexichromis festiva (Angas, 1864)
- Nembrotha edwardsi (Angas, 1864)
- Paliolla cooki (Angas, 1864)
- Plocamopherus imperialis Angas, 1864
- Pteraeolidia ianthina (Angas, 1864)
- Rostanga arbutus (Angas, 1864)
- Thordisa verrucosa (Crosse in Angas, 1864)
