= Pelagella punctata =

Scientific classification
- Kingdom: Animalia
- Phylum: Mollusca
- Class: Gastropoda
- Order: Nudibranchia
- Family: Goniodorididae
- Subfamily: Goniodoridinae
- Genus: Pelagella
- Species: P. punctata

Binomial name
- Pelagella punctata (Bergh, 1905)

Synonyms
- Goniodoris punctata Bergh, 1905

Species of gastropod

Pelagella punctata is a species of sea slug, a dorid nudibranch, a marine gastropod mollusc in the family Goniodorididae.

== Distribution ==
This species was first described from New Zealand.
