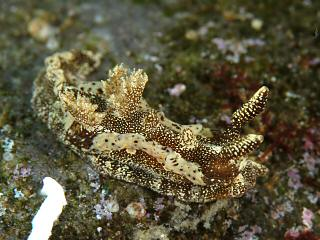
- Pelagella joubini in Osezaki, Japan

Scientific classification
- Kingdom: Animalia
- Phylum: Mollusca
- Class: Gastropoda
- Order: Nudibranchia
- Family: Goniodorididae
- Subfamily: Goniodoridinae
- Genus: Pelagella
- Species: P. joubini

Binomial name
- Pelagella joubini Risbec, 1928

Synonyms
- Goniodoris glabra Baba, 1937; Goniodoris joubini Risbec, 1928

= Pelagella joubini =

Species of gastropod

Pelagella joubini is a species of sea slug, a dorid nudibranch, a marine gastropod mollusc in the family Goniodorididae.

== Distribution ==
This species was first described from New Caledonia. Animals from Japan were described as Goniodoris glabra but appear to be the same species. Similar looking animals have been reported from Hong Kong, the Marshall Islands, Queensland and the Red Sea.

== Ecology ==
Pelagella joubini probably feeds on bryozoans or colonial ascidians but the diet is apparently not yet determined.
