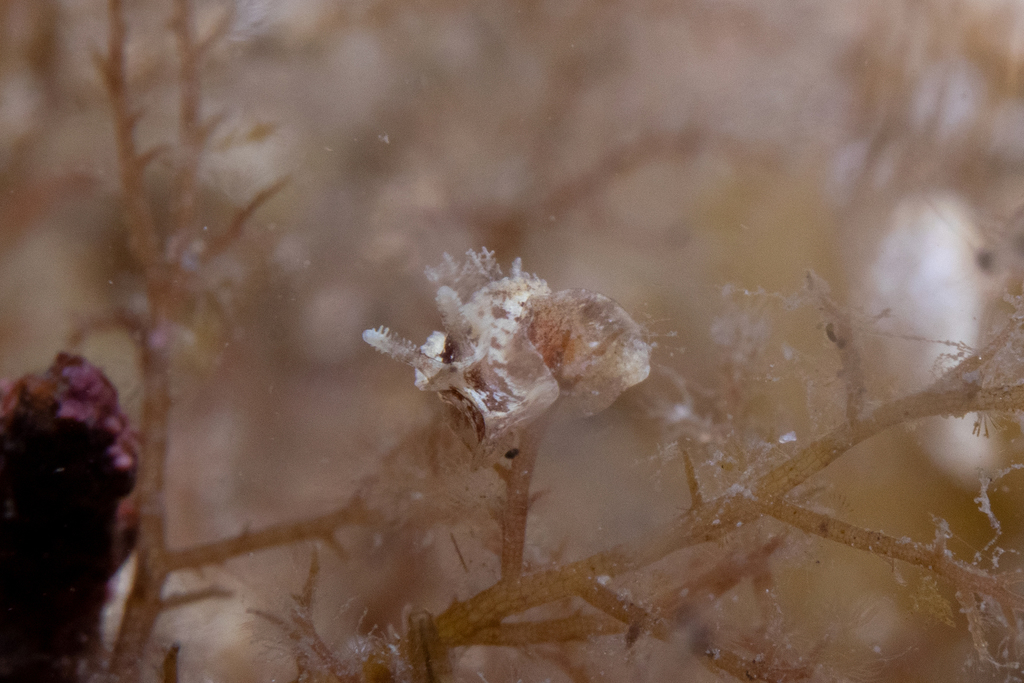

Scientific classification
- Kingdom: Animalia
- Phylum: Mollusca
- Class: Gastropoda
- Order: Nudibranchia
- Family: Goniodorididae
- Subfamily: Goniodoridinae
- Genus: Pelagella
- Species: P. meracula

Binomial name
- Pelagella meracula (Burn, 1958)

Synonyms
- Goniodoris meraculus Burn, 1958

= Pelagella meracula =

Species of gastropod

Pelagella meracula is a species of sea slug, a dorid nudibranch, a marine gastropod mollusc in the family Goniodorididae.

== Distribution ==
This species was first described from Victoria, south-eastern Australia. It is found from Pearson Island, South Australia to the mid New South Wales coast, from intertidal to 65 m depth.

== Description ==
This goniodorid nudibranch is translucent grey in colour, with spots and patches of white and brown surface pigment.

== Ecology ==
Pelagella meracula feeds on colonial ascidians into which it eats cavities within which it is often hidden.
