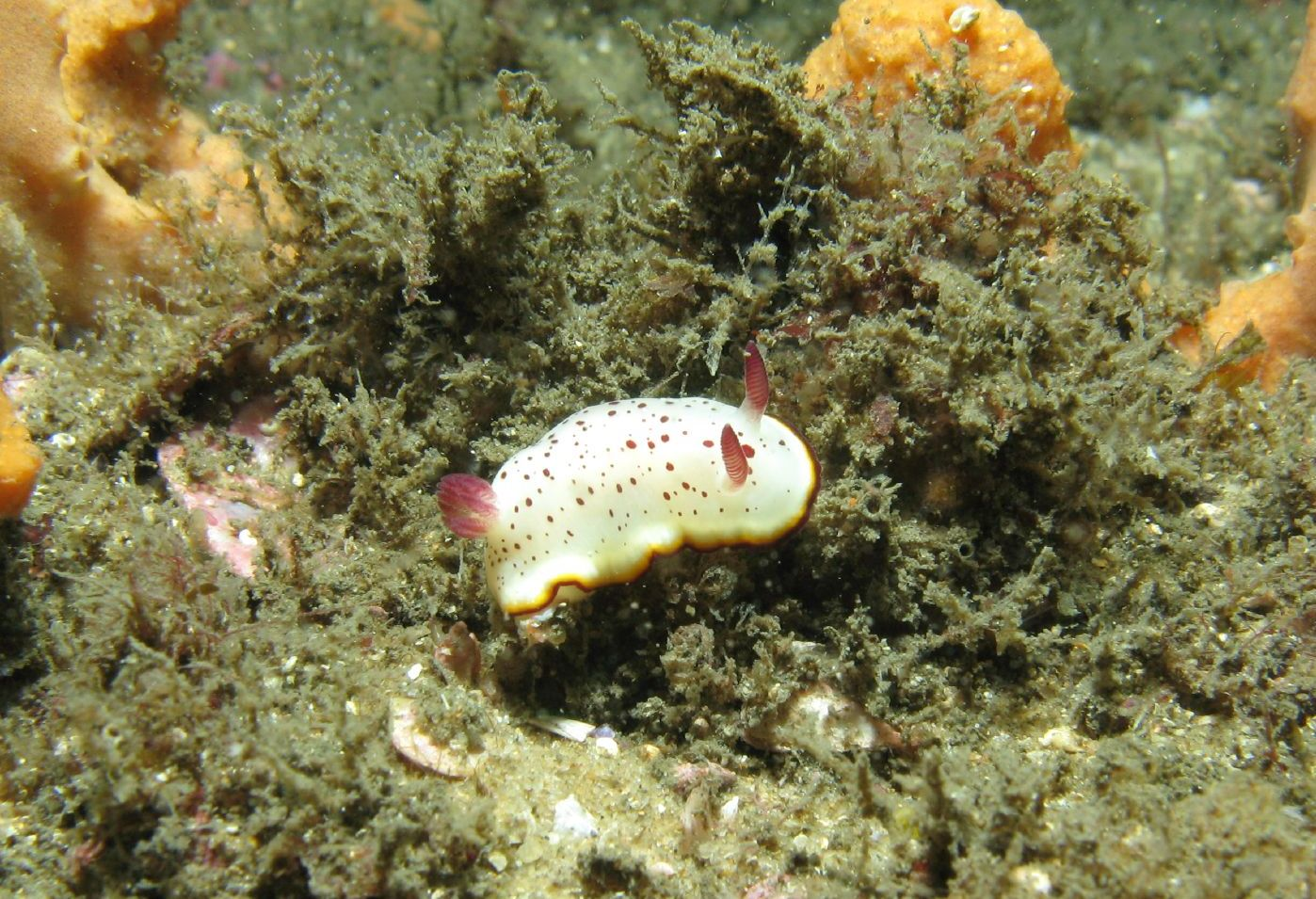
- Goniobranchus diaphne at La Perouse, Sydney, New South Wales, Australia

Scientific classification
- Kingdom: Animalia
- Phylum: Mollusca
- Class: Gastropoda
- Order: Nudibranchia
- Family: Chromodorididae
- Genus: Goniobranchus
- Species: G. daphne

Binomial name
- Goniobranchus daphne (Angas, 1864)

Synonyms
- Chromodoris daphne (Angas, 1864); Glossodoris daphne (Angas, 1864); Goniodoris daphne Angas, 1864 (basionym)

= Goniobranchus daphne =

Species of gastropod

Goniobranchus daphne is a species of colourful sea slug, a dorid nudibranch, a marine gastropod mollusc in the family Chromodorididae.

== Distribution ==
This species was described from Port Jackson, New South Wales, Australia. It is one of a group of similar red-spotted chromodorids from south-eastern Australia which form a mimicry ring.

== Description ==
Goniobranchus daphne is a chromodorid nudibranch which has a translucent white mantle with scattered red spots. The edge of the mantle is red grading into yellow on the inner side and there are numerous opaque white glands adjacent to this coloured band. The rhinophores are mostly red but translucent at the base. The gills have a deep pink outer rachis and white leaves. Compare with Goniobranchus splendidus, Goniobranchus hunterae and Goniobranchus tasmaniensis which all have similar coloration.
