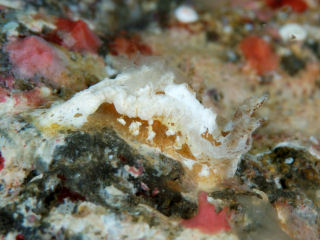
- Pelagella felis 8 m away, in the Izu Marine Park

Scientific classification
- Kingdom: Animalia
- Phylum: Mollusca
- Class: Gastropoda
- Order: Nudibranchia
- Family: Goniodorididae
- Subfamily: Goniodoridinae
- Genus: Pelagella
- Species: P. felis

Binomial name
- Pelagella felis (Baba, 1949)

Synonyms
- Goniodoris felis Baba, 1949

= Pelagella felis =

Species of gastropod

Pelagella felis is a species of sea slug, a dorid nudibranch, a marine gastropod mollusc in the family Goniodorididae.

== Distribution ==
This species was first described from Japan. It also occurs in Hong Kong and South Korea.

== Description ==
This goniodorid nudibranch is translucent pink in colour, with large areas of white surface pigment on the oral tentacles, along the pallial margin and back and sides of the body.

== Ecology ==
Pelagella felis probably feeds on bryozoans or colonial ascidians but the diet is apparently not yet determined.
