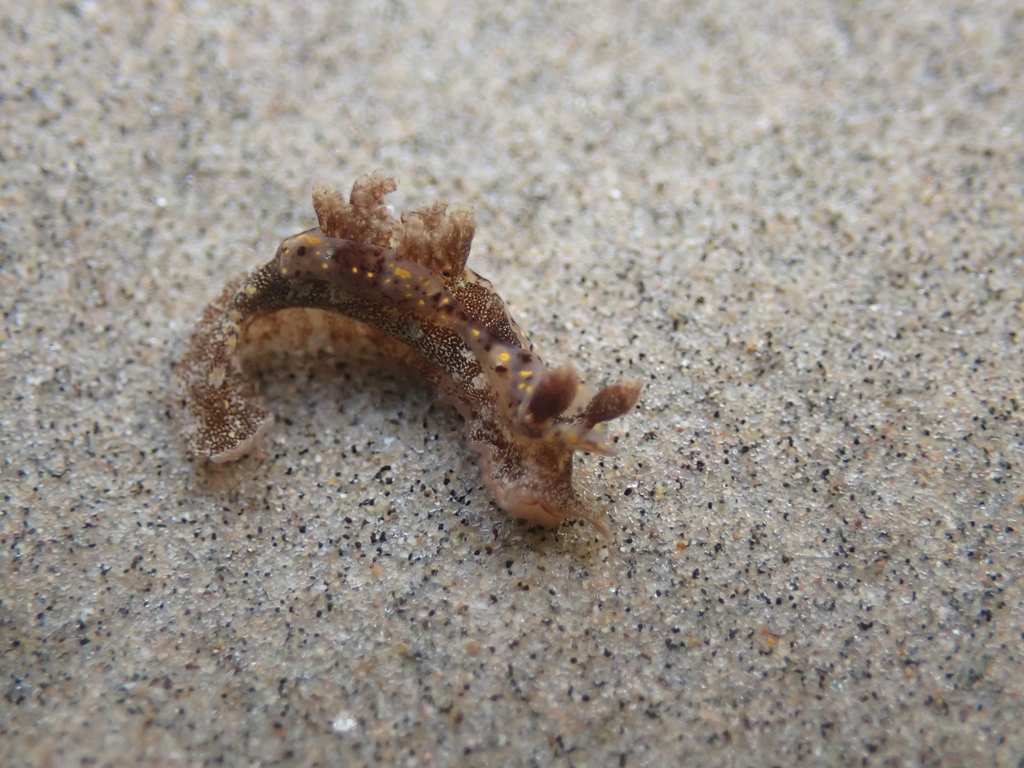

Scientific classification
- Kingdom: Animalia
- Phylum: Mollusca
- Class: Gastropoda
- Order: Nudibranchia
- Family: Goniodorididae
- Subfamily: Goniodoridinae
- Genus: Pelagella
- Species: P. modesta

Binomial name
- Pelagella modesta (Alder & A. Hancock, 1864)

Synonyms
- Goniodoris modesta Alder & Hancock, 1864

= Pelagella modesta =

Species of gastropod

Pelagella modesta is a species of sea slug, a dorid nudibranch, a marine gastropod mollusc in the family Goniodorididae.

== Distribution ==
This species was first described from India. It was amongst a collection of specimens given to Alder and Hancock for description by Walter Elliot. Elliot describes the collection localities as follows:

“Waltair is a suburb of the town of Vizagapatam, the capital of a province of the same name, one of the Northern Circars. The coast south of Vizagapatam is flat and sandy, with a heavy surf, which is unfavourable to the existence of naked Mollusks, but the whole of the coast of Vizagapatam is rocky, and sometimes precipitous, abounding in bays filled with rock and shingle, amongst which the delicate forms of the creatures you have been describing find shelter. Immediately to the north of Waltair is one of these bays, called Lawson's Bay, in which a large proportion of the specimens were found; but I employed men to search along a more extended line, both north and south of the bay. Most of the species were taken between tide-marks, and only one or two in deep water."

== Description ==
The original description reads:

Body oblong, with parallel sides, and tapering to a very slender tail of a chestnut brown colour. Cloak with a pale margin spotted with black and yellow, irregularly sinuated and turned up all round, forming two lobes before the dorsal tentacles, and expanded a good deal at the sides anteriorly, meeting in a point behind the branchiae, and thence forming a slight crest to the tail. Dorsal tentacles fusiform, largely laminated, and very slender below, brown like the body. Head very little extended beyond the cloak, produced into two clavate oral tentacles at the sides. Branchial plumes five, large, set rather widely apart found the anus; bi- or tri-pinnate, brown, the edges rather pale. Foot linear, tapering behind into a long slender tail. Length 1¼ inch.

== Ecology ==
Pelagella modesta probably feeds on bryozoans or colonial ascidians but the diet is apparently not yet determined.
