= Pelagella violacea =

Scientific classification
- Kingdom: Animalia
- Phylum: Mollusca
- Class: Gastropoda
- Order: Nudibranchia
- Family: Goniodorididae
- Subfamily: Goniodoridinae
- Genus: Pelagella
- Species: P. violacea

Binomial name
- Pelagella violacea (Risbec, 1928)

Synonyms
- Goniodoris violacea Risbec, 1928

Species of gastropod

Pelagella violacea is a species of sea slug, a dorid nudibranch, a marine gastropod mollusc in the family Goniodorididae.

== Distribution ==
This species was first described from New Caledonia. It has not been found elsewhere.

== Description ==
This goniodorid nudibranch is translucent violet in colour, with a dark violet edge along the pallial margin.

== Ecology ==
Pelagella violacea probably feeds on bryozoans or colonial ascidians but the diet is apparently not yet determined.
