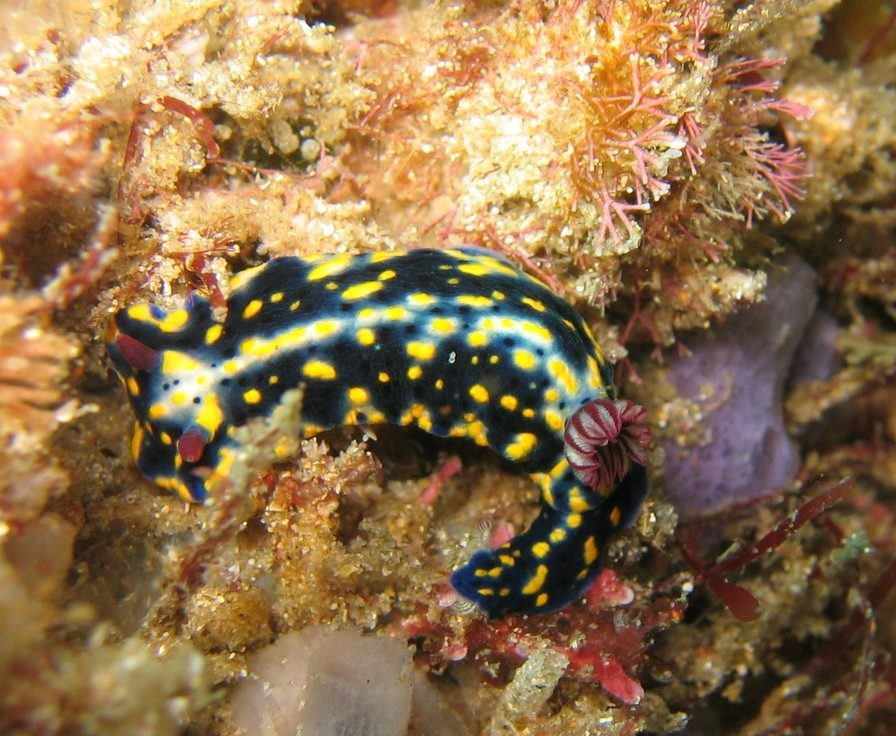

Scientific classification
- Kingdom: Animalia
- Phylum: Mollusca
- Class: Gastropoda
- Order: Nudibranchia
- Family: Chromodorididae
- Genus: Hypselodoris
- Species: H. obscura

Binomial name
- Hypselodoris obscura (Stimpson, 1855)

Synonyms
- Chromodoris crossei (Angas, 1864); Goniodoris crossei Angas, 1864; Goniodoris obscura Stimpson, 1855 (original combination)

= Hypselodoris obscura =

Species of gastropod

Hypselodoris obscura is a species of colourful sea slug or dorid nudibranch, a marine gastropod mollusk in the family Chromodorididae. It is the type species of the genus Hypselodoris.

This species eats sponges.

== Distribution ==
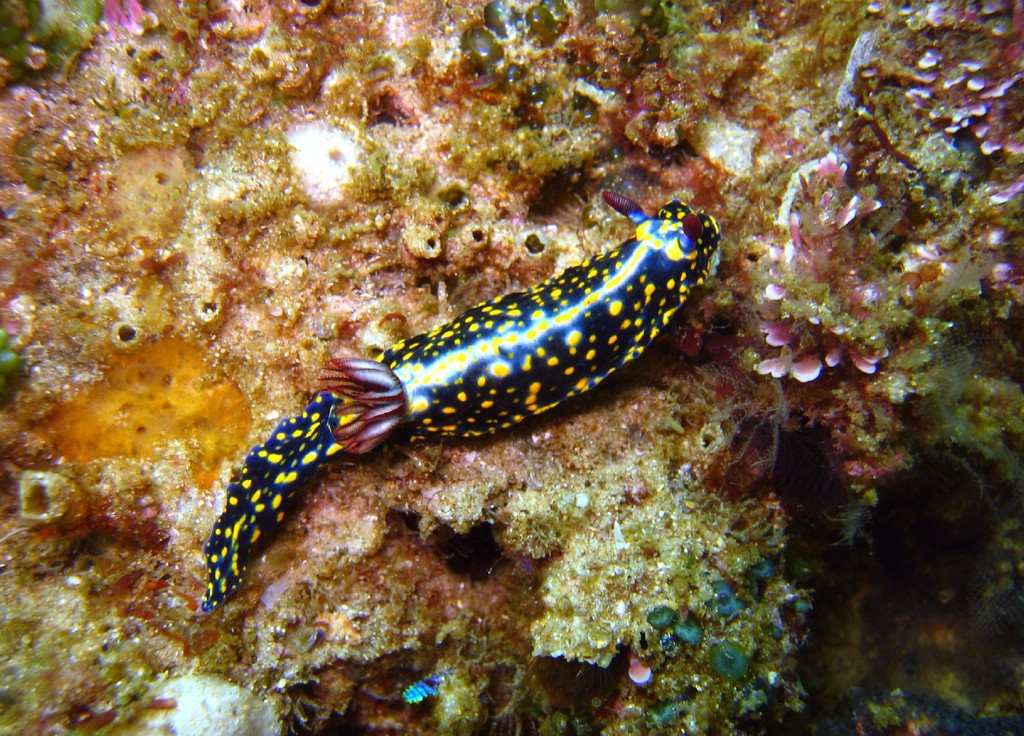

This nudibranch was described from Port Jackson, Australia. It is a warm temperate species only found in Southeastern Australia. It is related to the widespread tropical species Hypselodoris infucata and the similar Australian species Hypselodoris saintvincentius.

== Description ==
Hypselodoris obscura has a mottled appearance due to a grey or grey-blue background colour with yellow and black spots, which vary considerably in size between individuals. There is a paler stripe down the midline. The edge of the mantle is pale blue alternating with yellow. The gills and rhinophores are bright red.
