= Pelagella barroisi =

Scientific classification
- Kingdom: Animalia
- Phylum: Mollusca
- Class: Gastropoda
- Order: Nudibranchia
- Family: Goniodorididae
- Subfamily: Goniodoridinae
- Genus: Pelagella
- Species: P. barroisi

Binomial name
- Pelagella barroisi (Vayssière, 1901)

Synonyms
- Goniodoris barroisi Vayssière, 1901

Species of gastropod

Pelagella barroisi is a species of sea slug, a dorid nudibranch, a marine gastropod mollusc in the family Goniodorididae.

== Distribution ==
This species was first described from the Gulf of Marseille, France by A Vayssière in 1901. Harmless to humans it is found in sub tropical areas including the Mediterranean sea.
