= Pelagella aspersa =

Scientific classification
- Kingdom: Animalia
- Phylum: Mollusca
- Class: Gastropoda
- Order: Nudibranchia
- Family: Goniodorididae
- Subfamily: Goniodoridinae
- Genus: Pelagella
- Species: P. aspersa

Binomial name
- Pelagella aspersa (Alder & A. Hancock, 1864)

Synonyms
- Goniodoris aspersa Alder & Hancock, 1864

Species of gastropod

Pelagella aspersa is a species of sea slug or nudibranch, a marine gastropod mollusc in the family Goniodorididae.

== Distribution ==
This species was described from Waltair, Vizagapatam, Bay of Bengal, India.
