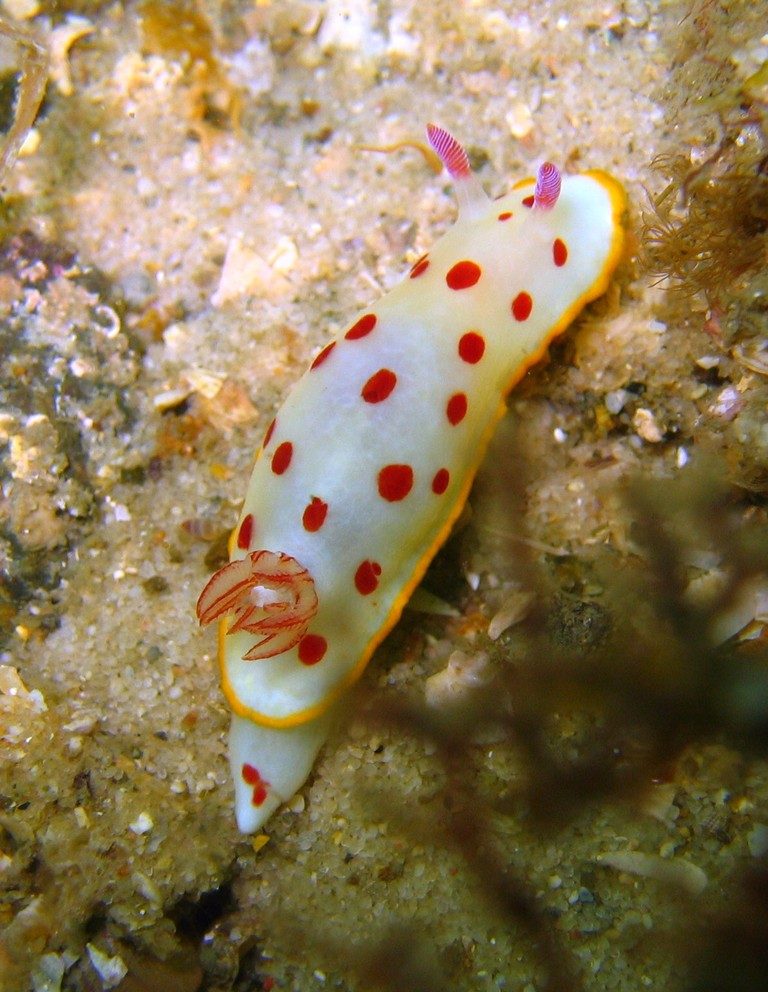

Scientific classification
- Kingdom: Animalia
- Phylum: Mollusca
- Class: Gastropoda
- Order: Nudibranchia
- Family: Chromodorididae
- Genus: Goniobranchus
- Species: G. splendidus

Binomial name
- Goniobranchus splendidus (Angas, 1864)

Synonyms
- Chromodoris splendidus (Angas, 1864); Glossodoris splendidus (Angas, 1864); Goniodoris splendidus Angas, 1864 (basionym)

= Goniobranchus splendidus =

Species of gastropod

Goniobranchus splendidus is a species of colourful sea slug, a dorid nudibranch, a marine gastropod mollusc in the family Chromodorididae. The specific epithet splendida means splendid in reference to the colouring, because this nudibranch has large red spots on a white background, a yellow line at the mantle edge, and magenta rhinophores.

== Distribution ==
This species was described from Port Jackson, New South Wales, Australia. It is one of a group of similar red-spotted chromodorids from south-eastern Australia which form a mimicry ring.

== Description ==
Goniobranchus splendidus is a chromodorid nudibranch which has an opaque white mantle with large, scattered red spots. In the northern part of its range these spots coalesce and may form a single large red patch in the middle of the back. The edge of the mantle is yellow. The rhinophore clubs are red with white edges to the lamellae. The gills have a two fine red lines on the outer rachis and white leaves. Compare with Goniobranchus daphne, Goniobranchus hunterae and Goniobranchus tasmaniensis which all have similar coloration.
