= Pelagella mercurialis =

Scientific classification
- Kingdom: Animalia
- Phylum: Mollusca
- Class: Gastropoda
- Order: Nudibranchia
- Family: Goniodorididae
- Subfamily: Goniodoridinae
- Genus: Pelagella
- Species: P. mercurialis

Binomial name
- Pelagella mercurialis (Macnae, 1958)

Synonyms
- Goniodoris mercurialis Macnae, 1958

Species of gastropod

Pelagella mercurialis is a species of sea slug, a dorid nudibranch, and a marine gastropod mollusc in the family Goniodorididae.

== Distribution ==
This species was first described from False Bay, South Africa. It is found on both sides of the Cape Peninsula.

== Description ==
This goniodorid nudibranch is translucent tan in colour, with large areas of white surface pigment on the oral tentacles and the back and sides of the body.

== Ecology ==
Pelagella mercurialis feeds on colonial ascidians.
