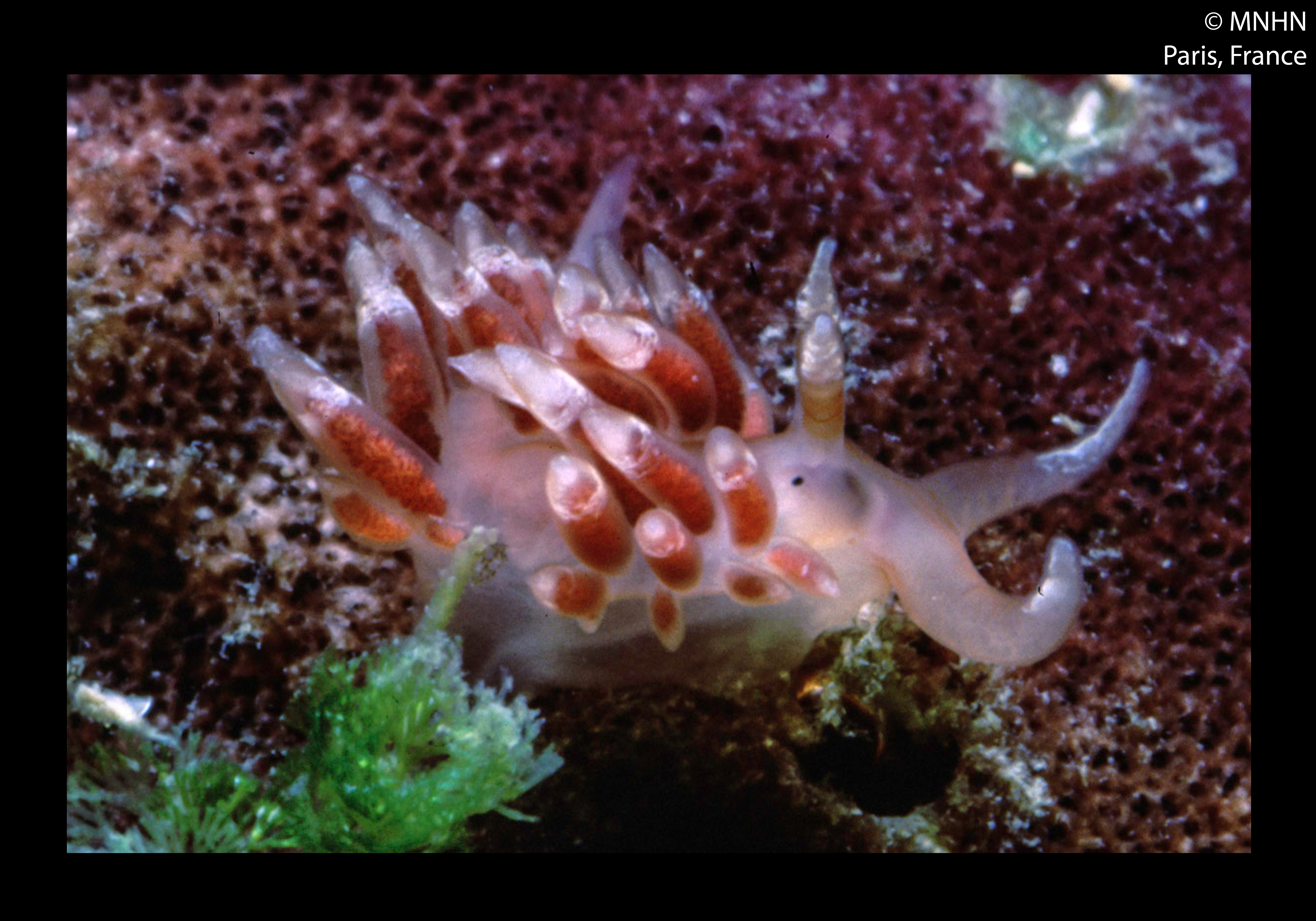
- Phidiana adiuncta

Scientific classification
- Kingdom: Animalia
- Phylum: Mollusca
- Class: Gastropoda
- Order: Nudibranchia
- Suborder: Aeolidacea
- Family: Facelinidae
- Genus: Phidiana; Gray, 1850

Type species
- Eolidia patagonica d'Orbigny, 1836

= Phidiana =

Genus of gastropods

Phidiana is a genus of sea slugs, aeolid nudibranchs, marine gastropod molluscs in the family Facelinidae.

== Species ==
Species within the genus Phidiana include:

- Phidiana adiuncta Ortea, Caballer & Moro, 2004
- Phidiana anulifera (Baba, 1949)
- Phidiana hiltoni (O'Donoghue, 1927)
- Phidiana lascrucensis Bertsch & Ferreira, 1974
- Phidiana lottini (Lesson, 1831)
- Phidiana lynceus Bergh, 1867
- Phidiana mariadelmarae Garcia F. & Troncoso, 1999
- Phidiana milleri Rudman, 1980
- Phidiana mimica Padula, Wirtz & Schrödl, 2017
- Phidiana patagonica (d'Orbigny, 1836)
- Phidiana pegasus Willan, 1987
- Phidiana riosi Garcia & Troncoso, 2003
- Phidiana salaamica Rudman, 1980
- Phidiana semidecora (Pease, 1860)
- Phidiana unilineata (Alder & Hancock, 1864)
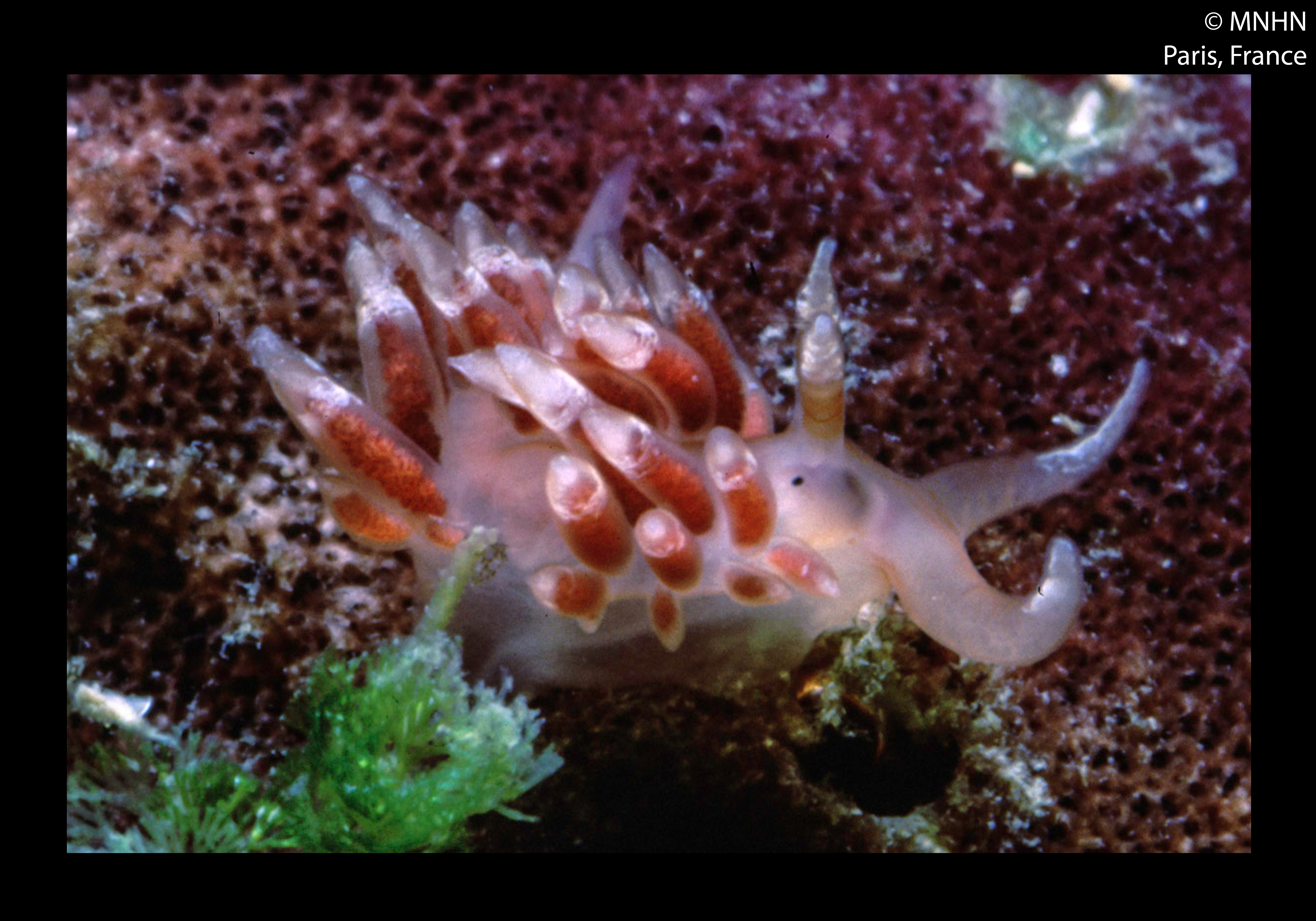
P. adiuncta

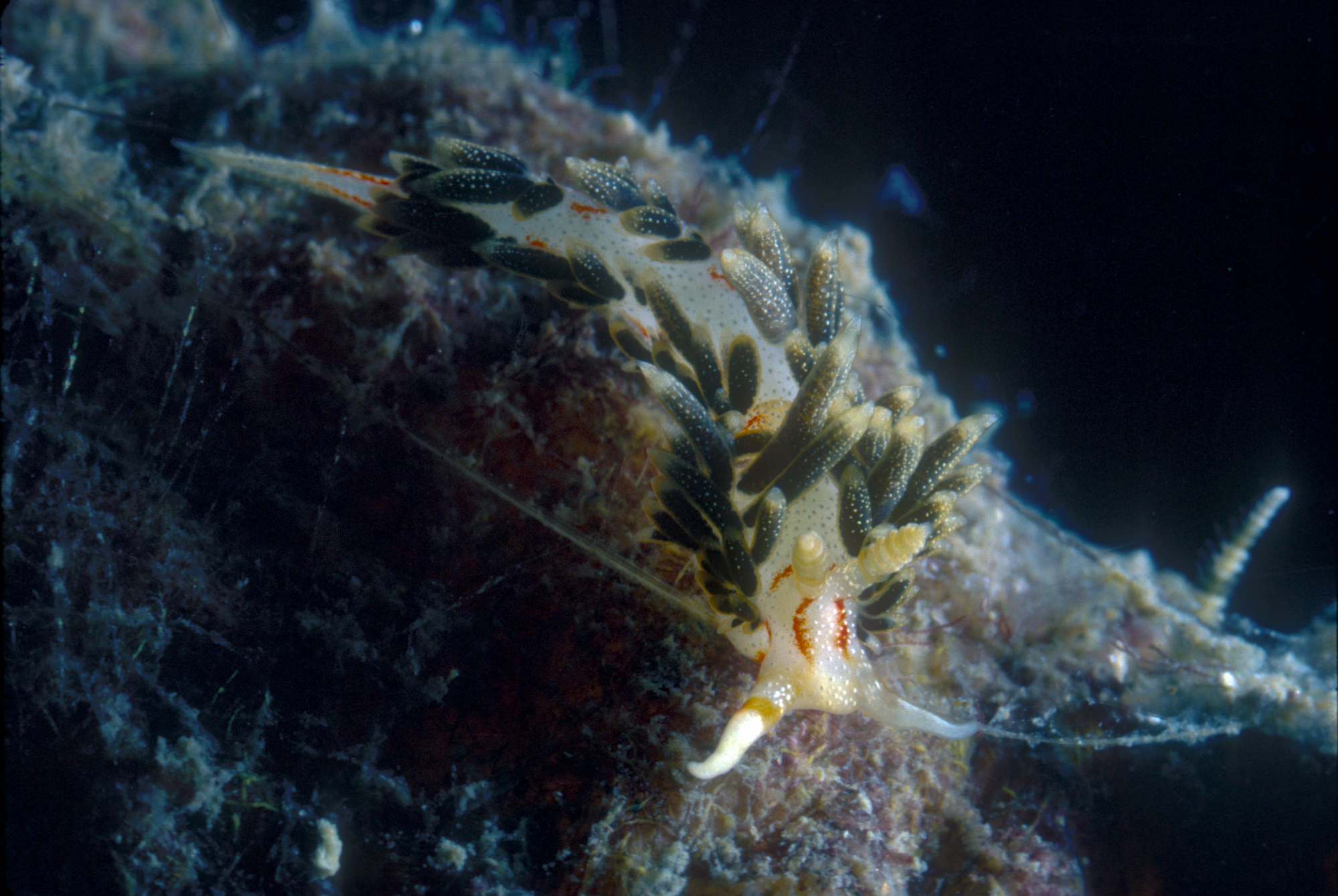
P. anulifera

P. hiltoni

P. lascrucensis

P. lottini

P. lynceus

P. milleri

P. semidecora

P. unilineata

Species brought into synonymy

- Phidiana attenuata Couthouy, 1852: synonym of Phidiana lottini (Lesson, 1831)
- Phidiana bourraili [sic]: synonym of Phidiana bourailli (Risbec, 1928): synonym of Facelina bourailli (Risbec, 1928)
- Phidiana brevicauda Engel, 1925: synonym of Phidiana lynceus Bergh, 1867
- Phidiana crassicornis (Eschscholtz, 1831): synonym of Hermissenda crassicornis (Eschscholtz, 1831)
- Phidiana exigua Bergh, 1898: synonym of Phidiana lottini (Lesson, 1831)
- Phidiana indica (Bergh, 1896: synonym of Caloria indica (Bergh, 1896
- Phidiana longicirrha Eliot, 1906: synonym of Pruvotfolia longicirrha (Eliot, 1906)
- Phidiana militaris (Alder & Hancock, 1864): synonym of Caloria militaris (Alder & Hancock, 1864)
- Phidiana nigra MacFarland, 1966: synonym of Phidiana hiltoni (O'Donoghue, 1927)
- Phidiana pugnax Lance, 1961: synonym of Phidiana hiltoni (O'Donoghue, 1927)
- Phidiana selencae Bergh, 1879: synonym of Phidiana lynceus Bergh, 1867
