= Facelina =

- Facelina auriculata

Scientific classification
- Kingdom: Animalia
- Phylum: Mollusca
- Class: Gastropoda
- Order: Nudibranchia
- Suborder: Aeolidacea
- Family: Facelinidae
- Genus: Facelina; Alder & Hancock, 1855

Synonyms
- Acanthopsole Trinchese, 1874; Cuthona (Hervia) Bergh, 1871; Facelinella Baba, 1949; Hervia Bergh, 1871; Montagua Fleming, 1822

Genus of gastropods

Facelina is a genus of sea slug, an aeolid nudibranch in the family Facelinidae.

== Species ==
Species within the genus Facelina include:

- Facelina annulata Macnae, 1954
- Facelina annulicornis (Chamisso & Eysenhardt, 1821)
- Facelina auriculata (Müller, 1776) - type species
- Facelina bilineata Hirano & Ito, 1998
- Facelina bostoniensis (Couthouy, 1838)
- Facelina bourailli (Risbec, 1928)
- Facelina carmelae Moro & Ortea, 2015
- Facelina coenda Er. Marcus, 1958
- Facelina dubia Pruvot-Fol, 1948
- Facelina fragilis (Risbec, 1928)
- Facelina fusca Schmekel 1966
- Facelina goslingii A. E. Verrill, 1901
- Facelina hartleyi Burn, 1962
- Facelina kaoruae (Er. Marcus, 1957)
- Facelina lineata Eliot, 1905
- Facelina lugubris (Bergh, 1882)
- Facelina newcombi (Angas, 1864)
- Facelina olivacea Macnae, 1954
- Facelina quadrilineata (Baba, 1930)
- Facelina rubrovittata (Costa A., 1866)
- Facelina rutila Pruvot-Fol, 1951
- Facelina schwobi (Labbé, 1923)
- Facelina vicina (Bergh, 1882)
- Facelina zhejiangensis Lin & You, 1990

Species brought into synonymy

- Facelina agari Smallwood, 1910: synonym of Berghia agari (Smallwood, 1910)
- Facelina coronata (Forbes & Goodsir, 1839): synonym of Facelina auriculata (Müller, 1776) - type species of Facelina
- Facelina faurei Barnard, 1927: synonym of Pruvotfolia faurei (Barnard, 1927)
- Facelina gabinierei Vincente, 1975: synonym of Paraflabellina gabinierei (Vicente, 1975) or Flabellina gabinierei (Vicente, 1975)
- Facelina hiltoni O'Donoghue, 1927: synonym of Phidiana hiltoni (O'Donoghue, 1927)
- Facelina marioni Vayssière, 1888: synonym of Facelinopsis marioni (Vayssière, 1888)
- Facelina plumosa (Fleming, 1828): synonym of Facelina auriculata (Müller, 1776)
- Facelina quatrefagesi Vayssière, 1888: synonym of Caloria quatrefagesi (Vayssière, 1888)
- Facelina rhodopos Yonow, 2000: synonym of Pruvotfolia rhodopos (Yonow, 2000)
- Facelina sargassicola Bergh, 1861: synonym of Spurilla sargassicola (Bergh, 1871)
- Facelina stearnsi Cockerell, 1901: synonym of Austraeolis stearnsi (Cockerell, 1901)
- Facelina variegata d'Oliveira, 1895: synonym of Berghia verrucicornis (A. Costa, 1867)
