= Facelina schwobi =

Scientific classification
- Kingdom: Animalia
- Phylum: Mollusca
- Class: Gastropoda
- Order: Nudibranchia
- Suborder: Aeolidacea
- Family: Facelinidae
- Genus: Facelina
- Species: F. schwobi

Binomial name
- Facelina schwobi (Labbé, 1923)

Species of gastropod

Facelina schwobi is a species of sea slug, an aeolid nudibranch, a marine gastropod mollusc in the family Facelinidae.

== Distribution ==
This species was described from Le Croisic on the Atlantic coast of France. Only reported once since the original description.

== Description ==
Facelina schwobi is described as having the digestive gland in the cerata a brown colour, similar to Facelina bostoniensis (Acanthopsole drummondi) but with bright ruby rings at the base and top. This is similar to the coloration of the digestive gland in Facelina auriculata.
