= Dondice =

- A live individual of Dondice occidentalis

Scientific classification
- Kingdom: Animalia
- Phylum: Mollusca
- Class: Gastropoda
- Order: Nudibranchia
- Suborder: Aeolidacea
- Family: Myrrhinidae
- Genus: Dondice; Marcus, 1958

Genus of gastropods

Dondice is a genus of sea slugs, aeolid nudibranchs, marine gastropod mollusks in the family Myrrhinidae.

== Species ==
Species within the genus Dondice include:

- Dondice arianeae García-Méndez, Padula & Valdés, 2022
- Dondice caboensis García-Méndez, Padula & Valdés, 2022
- Dondice freddiemercuryi García-Méndez, Padula & Valdés, 2022
- Dondice galaxiana Millen & Hermosillo, 2012
- Dondice juansanchezi García-Méndez, Padula & Valdés, 2022
- Dondice jupiteriensis García-Méndez, Padula & Valdés, 2022
- Dondice occidentalis Engel, 1925
- Dondice parguerensis Brandon & Cutress, 1985
- Dondice trainitoi Furfaro & Mariottini, 2020

Synonyms

- Dondice banyulensis Portmann & Sandmeier, 1960: synonym of Nemesignis banyulensis (Portmann & Sandmeier, 1960)
- Dondice nicolae Vicente, 1967: synonym of Nemesignis banyulensis (Portmann & Sandmeier, 1960)
- Dondice sebastiani (Er. Marcus, 1957): synonym of Nanuca sebastiani Er. Marcus, 1957
Dondice arianeae

Dondice freddiemercuryi

Dondice jupiteriensis

Dondice juansanchezi

Dondice occidentalis

Dondice trainitoi
