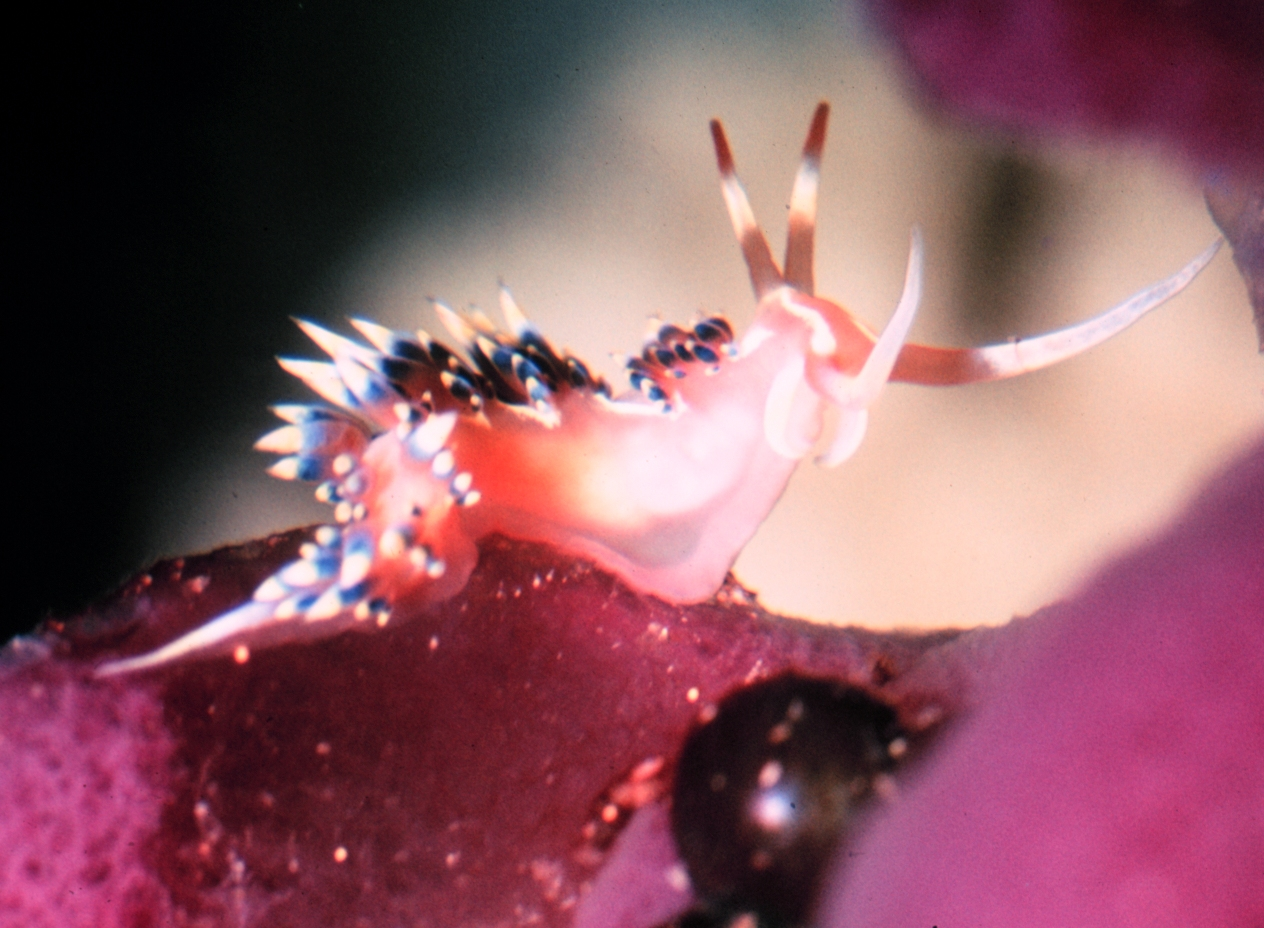
- Caloria indica

Scientific classification
- Kingdom: Animalia
- Phylum: Mollusca
- Class: Gastropoda
- Order: Nudibranchia
- Suborder: Aeolidacea
- Family: Facelinidae
- Genus: Caloria; Trinchese, 1888

Type species
- Caloria maculata Trinchese, 1888

= Caloria =

Genus of gastropods

Caloria is a genus of colorful sea slugs, aeolid nudibranchs. They are marine gastropod molluscs in the family Facelinidae.

== Species ==
Species within Caloria include:

- Caloria elegans (Alder & Hancock, 1845)
- Caloria guenanti (Risbec, 1928)
- Caloria indica (Bergh, 1896)
- Caloria quatrefagesi (Vayssière, 1888)
- Caloria militaris (Alder & Hancock, 1864)
- Caloria rosea (Bergh, 1888)
- Caloria sp. 1 black-dot nudibranch
- Caloria sp. 2 yellow-tipped nudibranch

Nomen dubium:

- Caloria australis Risbec, 1937

Species who have been brought into synonymy:

- Caloria maculata Trinchese, 1888: synonym ofCaloria elegans (Alder & Hancock, 1845)
- Caloria occidentalis H. Engel, 1925: synonym of Dondice occidentalis (H. Engel, 1925)
