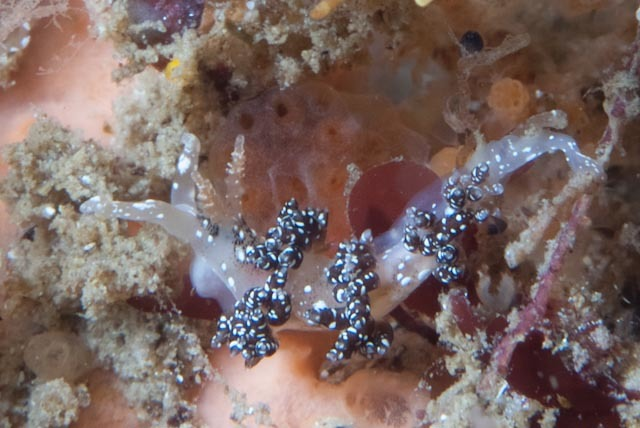

Scientific classification
- Kingdom: Animalia
- Phylum: Mollusca
- Class: Gastropoda
- Order: Nudibranchia
- Suborder: Aeolidacea
- Family: Facelinidae
- Genus: Amanda
- Species: A. armata

Binomial name
- Amanda armata Macnae, 1954

= Amanda armata =

Night sky nudibranch

Species of gastropod

Amanda armata, the night sky nudibranch, is a species of sea slug, specifically an aeolid nudibranch. It is a marine gastropod mollusc in the family Facelinidae.

== Distribution ==
This species is endemic to South Africa, having only been found around the coast on both sides of the Cape Peninsula, intertidally to about 15 m.

== Description ==
The night sky nudibranch grows to between 10 and 20 mm in total length. It is a slender, pale-bodied nudibranch with groups of brown cerata having large white spots running down the length of the body. Its rhinophores are annulate, and there is a pair of elongated oral tentacles with white blotches.

== Ecology ==
The food and egg mass of this nudibranch are unknown.
