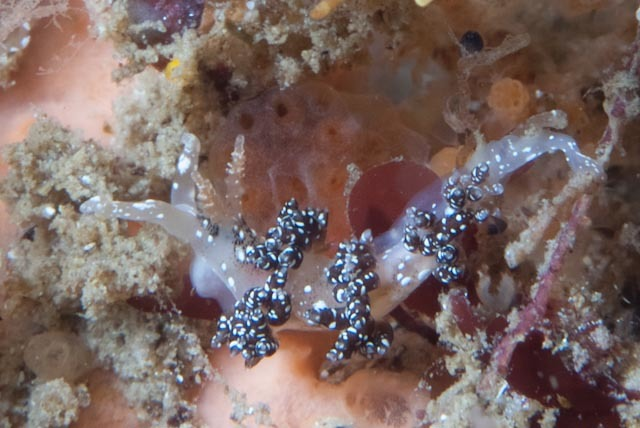
- Amanda armata

Scientific classification
- Kingdom: Animalia
- Phylum: Mollusca
- Class: Gastropoda
- Order: Nudibranchia
- Suborder: Aeolidacea
- Family: Facelinidae
- Genus: Amanda; Macnae, 1954

= Amanda (gastropod) =

Genus of gastropods

Amanda is a genus of sea slugs, specifically of aeolid nudibranchs. They are marine gastropod molluscs in the family Facelinidae.

== Species ==
Species in this genus include:

- Amanda armata Macnae, 1954
