= Alice Pruvot-Fol =

French malacologist

- Born: Alice Marianne Fol; 4 August 1873; Vandœuvres, Canton of Geneva, Switzerland
- Died: 28 March 1972 (aged 98); Paris
- Known for: Describing many new species
- Spouse: Georges Pruvôt
- Father: Hermann Fol
- Scientific career
- Fields: Malacology
- Author abbrev. (zoology): Pruvot-Fol

Alice Pruvot-Fol (4 August 1873 – 28 March 1972) was a French opisthobranch malacologist, especially the Nudibranchia.

She was the author of many new species, mostly described on the basis of preserved animals. She described a new species (Nembrotha rutilans, Pruvot-Fol, 1931) on the basis of a painted illustration in a book by William Saville-Kent (1893) entitled The Great Barrier Reef of Australia. She continued working and naming new species until late in her life. Even in 1962, when she was 89 years old, she named Phyllidia pulitzeri.

== Species ==
Some of the species described by her:

- Aldisa banyulensis Pruvot-Fol, 1951
- Aplysiopsis formosa Pruvot-Fol
- Atagema gibba Pruvot-Fol
- Atagema rugosa Pruvot-Fol, 1951
- Chelidonura africana Pruvot-Fol
- Chromodoris kuniei Pruvot-Fol, 1930
- Cumanotus cuenoti Pruvot-Fol, 1948
- Doriopsilla rarispinosa Pruvot-Fol, 1951
- Elysia babai Pruvot-Fol, 1945
- Elysia mercieri Pruvot-Fol, 1930
- Facelina dubia Pruvot-Fol, 1949
- Glossodoris hikuerensis (Pruvot-Fol, 1954)
- Goniodoridella savignyi Pruvot-Fol, 1933
- Hermaea paucicirra Pruvot-Fol, 1953
- Hypselodoris dollfusi (Pruvot-Fol, 1933
- Hypselodoris fontandraui Pruvot-Fol, 1951.
- Laginiopsis trilobata Pruvot-Fol, 1922
- Marianina rosea (Pruvot-Fol, 1930)
- Nembrotha rutilans (Pruvot-Fol, 1931) is a synonym for Nembrotha purpureolineata O'Donoghue, 1924
- Phyllidia bataviae Pruvot-Fol, 1957
- Phyllidia pulitzeri Pruvot-Fol, 1962
- Phyllidiopsis krempfi Pruvot-Fol, 1957
- Trapania Pruvot-Fol, 1931
- Thecacera darwini, Pruvot-Fol, 1950
- Thordisa filix Pruvot-Fol, 1951

=== Named in her honor ===
Several genera and species were named in her honor:

- Aegires pruvotfolae Fahey & Gosliner, 2004
- Elysia pruvotfolae Ernst Marcus, 1957
- Hallaxa apefae Marcus & Marcus, (using just the initials APF)
- Pruvotaplysia Engel, 1936
- Pruvotfolia Tardy, 1970
- Pruvotfolia pselliotes
- Pruvotfolia longicirrha n.comb.

== Selected works ==
- Pruvot, A., 1922. Sur un type nouveau et remarquable de gymnosomes (Laginiopsis n.g.). -- Compt. Rend. hebdom. Séanc. Acad. Sci, 174: 696–698.
- Pruvot-Fol, A., 1924. Étude de quelques gymnosomes méditerranéens des pêches de l'Orvet en 1921 et 1922. -- Arch. Zool. Exp. Gén., 62(6): 345–400, 32 figs, pls 15–16.
- Pruvot-Fol, A., 1925. Contributions à l'étude du genre Janthina Bolten. -- C.R. hebd. Séances Acad. Sci., 181: ....
- Pruvot-Fol, A., 1926. Mollusques ptéropodes gymnosomes provenant des campagnes du *Prince Albert 1 de Monaco. -- Résultats des Campagnes Scientifiques accomplies sur son yacht par Albert I, Prince souverain de Monaco, publiés sous sa direction avec le concours de M. Jules Richard, Docteur ès-sciences, chargé des travaux zoologiques à bord, 70: 1-60, 3 tabs, 102 figs. ISBN 2-7260-0083-5
- Pruvot-Fol, A., 1930. Sur l'identité réelle et la valeur systématique de Micrella dubia Bgh.. -- Bull. Soc. zool. France, 55: 210–213.
- Pruvot-Fol, A., 1932. Note sur quelques gymnosomes de provenances diverses et diagnose d'un genre nouveau. -- Arch. Zool. expér. gén., 74 (vol. jub.): 507–529, 18 figs, pl. 3.
- Pruvot-Fol, A., 1934. Les opisthobranches de Quoy & Gaimard. Appendum 2. Les gymnosomes de Quoy & Gaimard. -- Arch. Mus. Nat. Hist. nat., (6)11: 81.
- Pruvot-Fol, A., 1934. Note malacologique. A propos du tubercule médian du pied des gymnosomes. -- Bull. Soc. zool. France, 59(4): 291–293.
- Pruvot-Fol, A., 1934. Faune et flore de la Méditerranée. Gastropoda-Opisthobranchia-Gymnosomata. -- Comm. Intern. Expl. Sc. Mer Méditerr., .....
- Pruvot-Fol, A., 1936. Morphologie du pied des mollusques. Ses homologies. -- Verh. schweiz. Naturf. Gesellsch., 117: 327–328.
- Pruvot-Fol, A., 1938. Sur les apparences trompeuses de quelques échantillons de gymnosomes à l'état conservé. -- Journal de Conchyliologie, 82(3): 256–258, figs A-B, pl. 4.
- Pruvot-Fol, A., 1942. Les gymnosomes. -- Dana Rep., 4(20): 1-54, 77 figs.
- Pruvot-Fol A. (1951). "Étude des nudibranches de la Méditerranée". Archives de zoologie expérimentale et générale 88(1): 73.
- Pruvot-Fol A. (1954). "Mollusques Opisthobranches". Faune de France, P. Lechevalier Paris 58: 1–460.
- Pruvot-Fol, A., 1954. Mollusques opisthobranches. Paris, Lechevalier: 1–457, 173 figs, 1 pl.
- Pruvot-Fol, A., 1960. Les organes génitaux des opisthobranches. -- Arch. Zool. expér. gén., 99(2): 135–223, 33 figs.
- Pruvot-Fol, A., 1963. Les ventouses chez les mollusques gastéropodes et plus spécialement chez les gymnosomes. -- Journal de Conchyliologie, 103(1): 3-20, 11 figs.

== See also ==
Category:Taxa named by Alice Pruvot-Fol
