= Facelina annulata =

Scientific classification
- Kingdom: Animalia
- Phylum: Mollusca
- Class: Gastropoda
- Order: Nudibranchia
- Suborder: Aeolidacea
- Family: Facelinidae
- Genus: Facelina
- Species: F. annulata

Binomial name
- Facelina annulata Macnae, 1954

Species of gastropod

Facelina annulata is a species of sea slug, an aeolid nudibranch, a marine gastropod mollusc in the family Facelinidae.

== Distribution ==
This species was described from a specimen found on the shore one mile SW of the mouth of the Kowie River, Port Alfred, Eastern Cape, South Africa.
