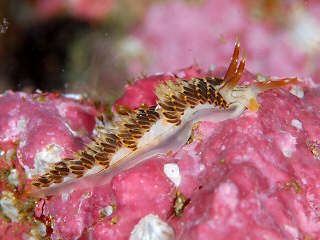

Scientific classification
- Kingdom: Animalia
- Phylum: Mollusca
- Class: Gastropoda
- Order: Nudibranchia
- Suborder: Aeolidacea
- Family: Facelinidae
- Genus: Facelina
- Species: F. quadrilineata

Binomial name
- Facelina quadrilineata (Baba, 1930)

Synonyms
- Hervia quadrilineata Baba, 1930

= Facelina quadrilineata =

Species of gastropod

Facelina quadrilineata is a species of sea slug, an aeolid nudibranch, a marine gastropod mollusc in the family Facelinidae.

== Distribution ==
This species has been reported from Japan where it is a common species.

== Description ==
This species has a pattern of four lines on the head. Facelina bilineata has been confused with this species in the past.
