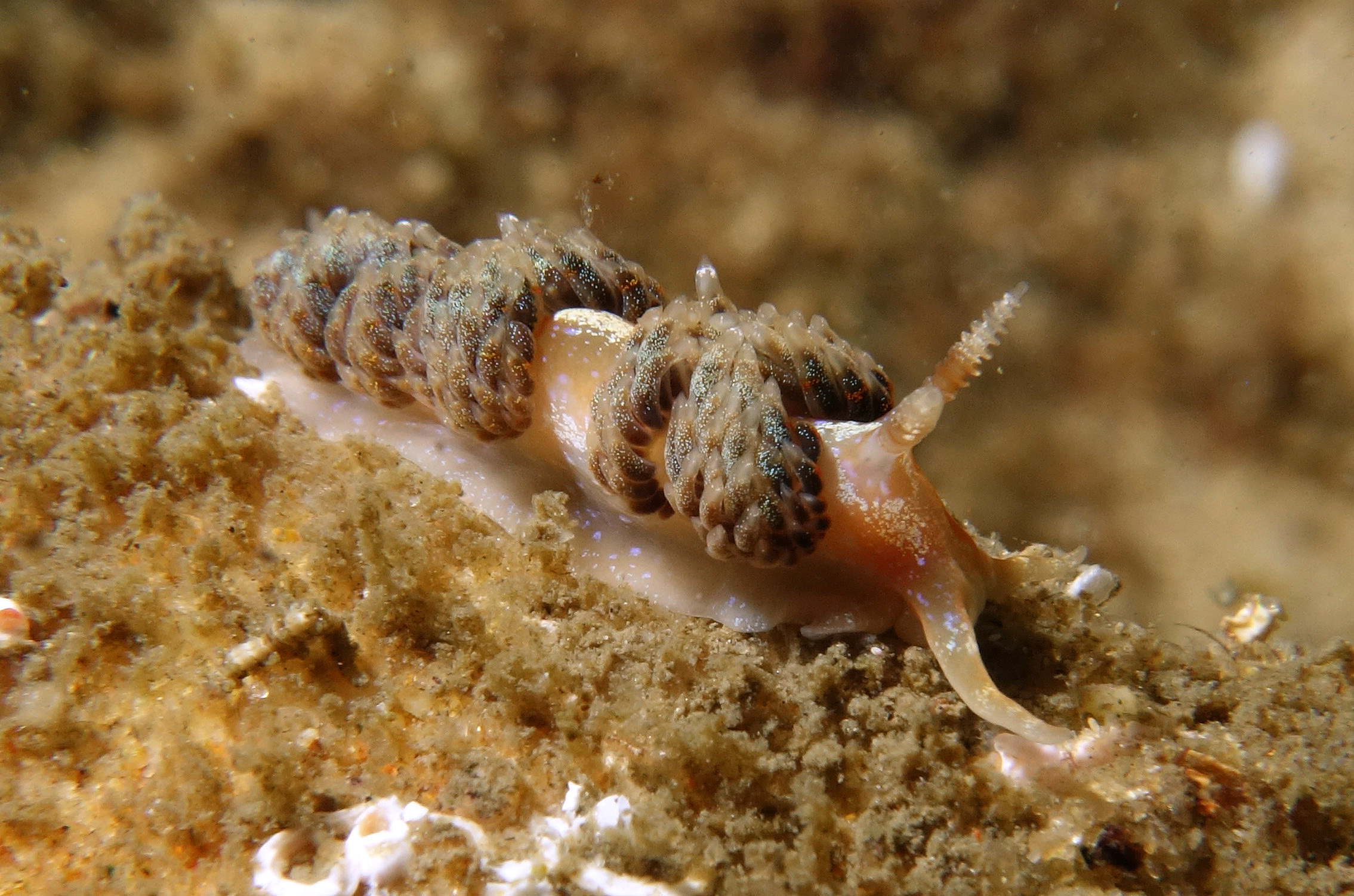
- Austraeolis ornata

Scientific classification
- Kingdom: Animalia
- Phylum: Mollusca
- Class: Gastropoda
- Order: Nudibranchia
- Suborder: Aeolidacea
- Family: Facelinidae
- Genus: Austraeolis; Burn 1962

Type species
- Flabellina ornata Angas, 1864

= Austraeolis =

Genus of gastropods

Austraeolis is a genus of sea slugs, aeolid nudibranchs, shell-less marine gastropod molluscs in the taxonomic family Facelinidae.

== Species ==
Species within this genus include:

- Austraeolis benthicola Burn, 1966
- Austraeolis catina Ev. Marcus & Er. Marcus, 1967
- Austraeolis ornata (Angas, 1864)
- Austraeolis stearnsi (Cockerell, 1901)

Species brought into synonymy

- Austraeolis fucia Burn, 1962: synonym of Facelina hartleyi Burn, 1962
- Austraeolis westralis Burn, 1966: synonym of Austraeolis ornata (Angas, 1864)
