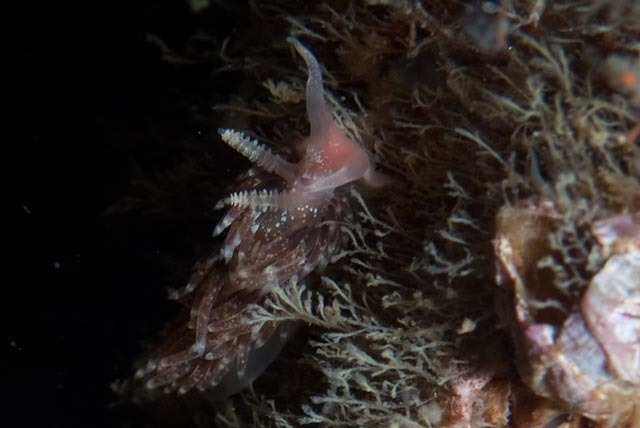

Scientific classification
- Kingdom: Animalia
- Phylum: Mollusca
- Class: Gastropoda
- Order: Nudibranchia
- Suborder: Aeolidacea
- Family: Facelinidae
- Genus: Facelina
- Species: F. olivacea

Binomial name
- Facelina olivacea Macnae, 1954

= Facelina olivacea =

Species of gastropod

Facelina olivacea is a species of sea slug, an aeolid nudibranch, a marine gastropod mollusc in the family Facelinidae.

== Distribution ==
This species was described from Table Bay Harbour and Saldanha, Western Cape, South Africa. It is endemic to the Cape Province of South Africa. It has also been found at Knysna and Jeffrey's Bay, Eastern Cape on the Indian Ocean coast.
