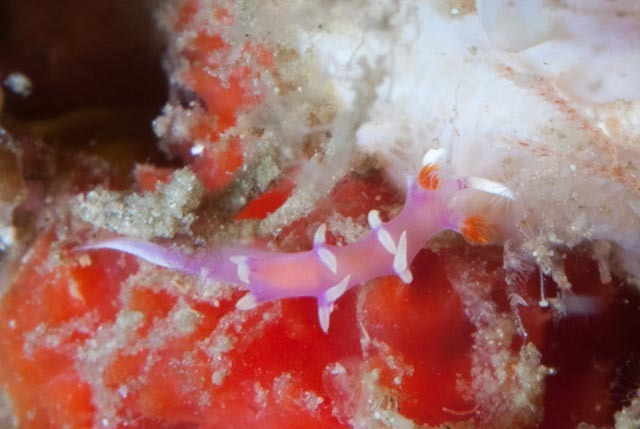

Scientific classification
- Kingdom: Animalia
- Phylum: Mollusca
- Class: Gastropoda
- Order: Nudibranchia
- Suborder: Tritoniacea
- Family: Tritoniidae
- Genus: Marianina; Pruvot-Fol, 1931

Species
- See text

Synonyms
- Mariana Pruvot-Fol, 1930

= Marianina =

Genus of molluscs

Marianina is a genus of sea slugs, nudibranchs, shell-less marine gastropod molluscs in the family Tritoniidae.

== Species ==
Two species are recognised in the genus Marianina:

- Marianina khaleesi (Silva, de Azevedo et Matthews-Cascon, 2014)
- Marianina rosea (Pruvot-Fol, 1930)
