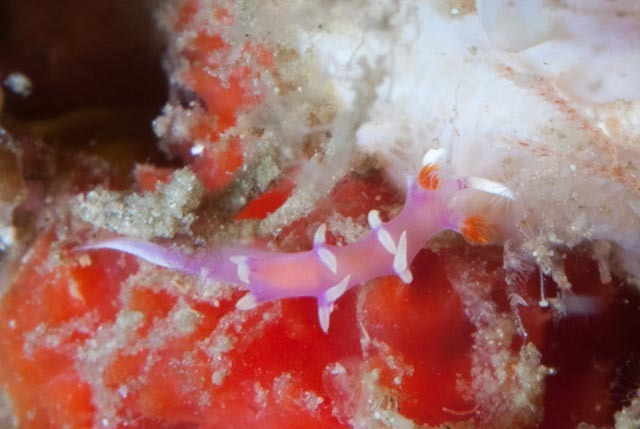

Scientific classification
- Kingdom: Animalia
- Phylum: Mollusca
- Class: Gastropoda
- Order: Nudibranchia
- Suborder: Tritoniacea
- Family: Tritoniidae
- Genus: Marianina
- Species: M. rosea

Binomial name
- Marianina rosea (Pruvot-Fol, 1930)

Synonyms
- Mariana rosea Pruvot-Fol, 1930; Aranucus bifidus Odhner, 1936

= Marianina rosea =

Species of gastropod

Marianina rosea is a species of sea slug, a dendronotid nudibranch, a marine gastropod mollusc in the family Tritoniidae.

== Distribution ==
Marianina rosea was discovered at Ile de Pins, New Caledonia and first described in 1930. It is found throughout the Tropical Indo-Pacific from the Marianas Islands to South Africa.
