= Caloria rosea =

Scientific classification
- Kingdom: Animalia
- Phylum: Mollusca
- Class: Gastropoda
- Order: Nudibranchia
- Suborder: Aeolidacea
- Family: Facelinidae
- Genus: Caloria
- Species: C. rosea

Binomial name
- Caloria rosea (Bergh, 1888)

Synonyms
- Hervia rosea Bergh, 1888

Species of gastropod

Caloria rosea is a species of sea slug, an aeolid nudibranch, a marine gastropod mollusc in the family Facelinidae.

== Distribution ==
This species was described from Ambon Island, Indonesia.

== Description ==
The length of the living animal was 5.5 cm. The basic color of the body quite bright rose red; on the body sides two whitish spots, as well as on the upper side of the head one and in the area of the pericardium another whitish spot, all very fine greyish dotted and contrasting by their opacity against the otherwise completely transparent body; the papillae of the back were brown, only the tip blue.
