= Pruvotfolia =

- Pruvotfolia pselliotes in France

Scientific classification
- Kingdom: Animalia
- Phylum: Mollusca
- Class: Gastropoda
- Order: Nudibranchia
- Suborder: Aeolidacea
- Family: Facelinidae
- Genus: Pruvotfolia; J. Tardy, 1970

Type species
- Acanthopsole pselliotes Labbé, 1923

Synonyms
- Rolandia Pruvot-Fol, 1951

Genus of gastropods

Pruvotfolia is a genus of colorful sea slugs, aeolid nudibranchs. They are marine gastropod molluscs in the family Facelinidae.

== Taxonomic history ==
Pruvotfolia was established in 1970 with the purpose of giving Pruvotfolia pselliotes distinction from where it was previously placed in Facelina. Jean Tardy states that Labbé, the authority on the species, did not have the knowledge at hand in 1923 to recognize the species necessitated a genus separate from Facelina. In addition to the type species, Tardy recognized Pruvotfolia faurei and Pruvotfolia dollfusae (later made synonym to Pruvotfolia longicirrha) as belonging to his new genus.

For clarity: though Tardy refers to Labbé's work under Facelina, Labbé actually originally described P. pselliotes under Acanthopsole. While it is true the genus had since been made synonymous with Facelina, this is not how citation of original descriptions are handled. In fact, many texts and records, including but not limited to Bill Rudman's the Sea Slug Forum and the very notable Bouchet et al. 2017 revision of gastropod taxonomy, cite Facelina pselliotes as its original name. Meanwhile, not only does the World Register of Marine Species maintain that Acanthopsole held the original description, it does not even list Facelina pseillotes under synonyms of the species. It is unclear why any of this is.

== Description ==
Tardy described Pruvotfolia as resembling Facelinids, but having more numerous cerata with inconsistent lengths along the body. Additionally, the cerata have a tendency of curling in on themselves in a spiral. Rhinophores are lamellated, foot corners are tentaculiforme, and the oral tentacles long and robust.

== Species ==
Species currently within Pruvotfolia include:

- Pruvotfolia faurei (Barnard, 1927)
- Pruvotfolia longicirrha (Eliot, 1906)
- Pruvotfolia pselliotes (Labbé, 1923)
- Pruvotfolia rhodopos (Yonow, 2000)
- Pruvotfolia rochebruni Ortea, Moro & Caballer, 2002
