= Phidiana lottini =

Scientific classification
- Kingdom: Animalia
- Phylum: Mollusca
- Class: Gastropoda
- Order: Nudibranchia
- Suborder: Aeolidacea
- Family: Facelinidae
- Genus: Phidiana
- Species: P. lottini

Binomial name
- Phidiana lottini (Lesson, 1831)

Synonyms
- Eolidia lottini Lesson, 1831 (original combination); Phidiana inca d'Orbigny, 1837; Phidiana attenuata Couthouy, 1852; Cratena cavanca Bergh, 1898; Phidiana exigua Bergh, 1898

Species of gastropod

Phidiana lottini is a species of sea slug, a nudibranch, a marine, gastropod mollusc in the family Facelinidae.

== Distribution ==
This species was described from Port St Vincent, Talcahuano, Chile, 36.732°S 73.136°W. It has been reported from Callao, Peru, 12.079°S 77.176°W and Los Hornos, 29°38′S 71°20′W south to Bahía de Coliumo, 36°32′S 72°57′W and Gulf of Ancud, 41.812°S 73.806°W.
