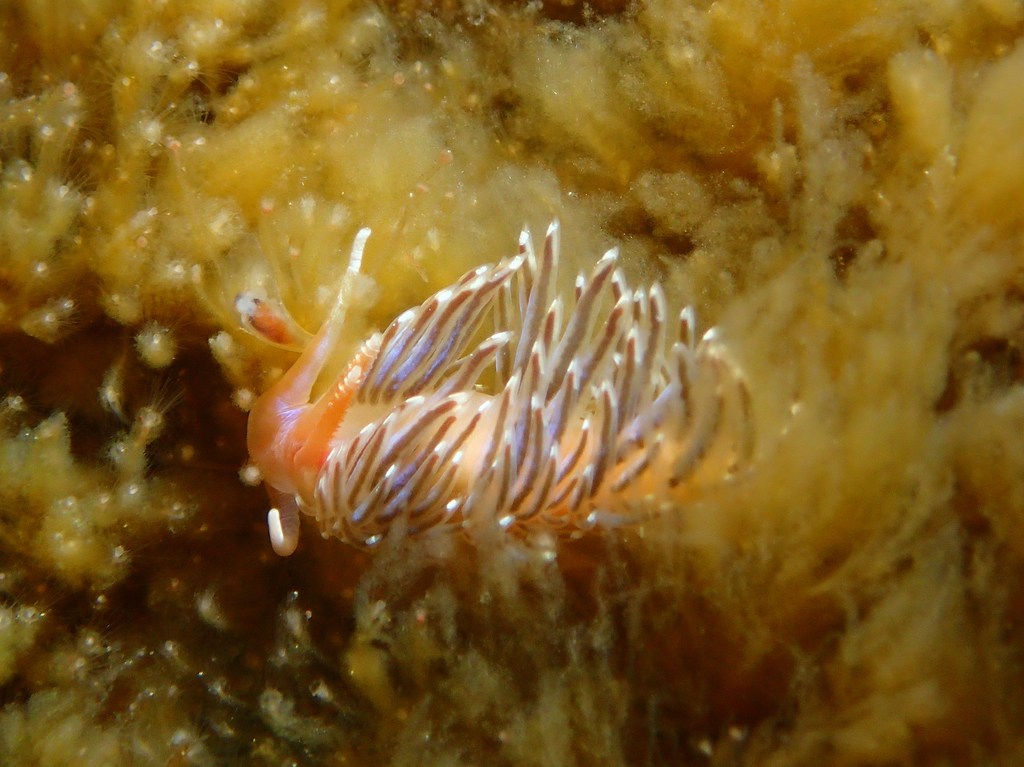

Scientific classification
- Kingdom: Animalia
- Phylum: Mollusca
- Class: Gastropoda
- Order: Nudibranchia
- Suborder: Aeolidacea
- Family: Facelinidae
- Genus: Facelina
- Species: F. vicina

Binomial name
- Facelina vicina (Bergh, 1882)

Synonyms
- Acanthopsole vicina Bergh, 1882

= Facelina vicina =

Species of gastropod

Facelina vicina is a species of sea slug, an aeolid nudibranch, a marine gastropod mollusc in the family Facelinidae.

== Distribution ==
This species was described from Trieste, Adriatic Sea.
