= Facelina lugubris =

Scientific classification
- Kingdom: Animalia
- Phylum: Mollusca
- Class: Gastropoda
- Order: Nudibranchia
- Suborder: Aeolidacea
- Family: Facelinidae
- Genus: Facelina
- Species: F. lugubris

Binomial name
- Facelina lugubris (Bergh, 1882)

Synonyms
- Acanthopsole lugubris Bergh, 1882

Species of gastropod

Facelina lugubris is a species of sea slug, an aeolid nudibranch, a marine gastropod mollusc in the family Facelinidae.

== Distribution ==
The type locality for this species is Trieste in the Adriatic Sea.
