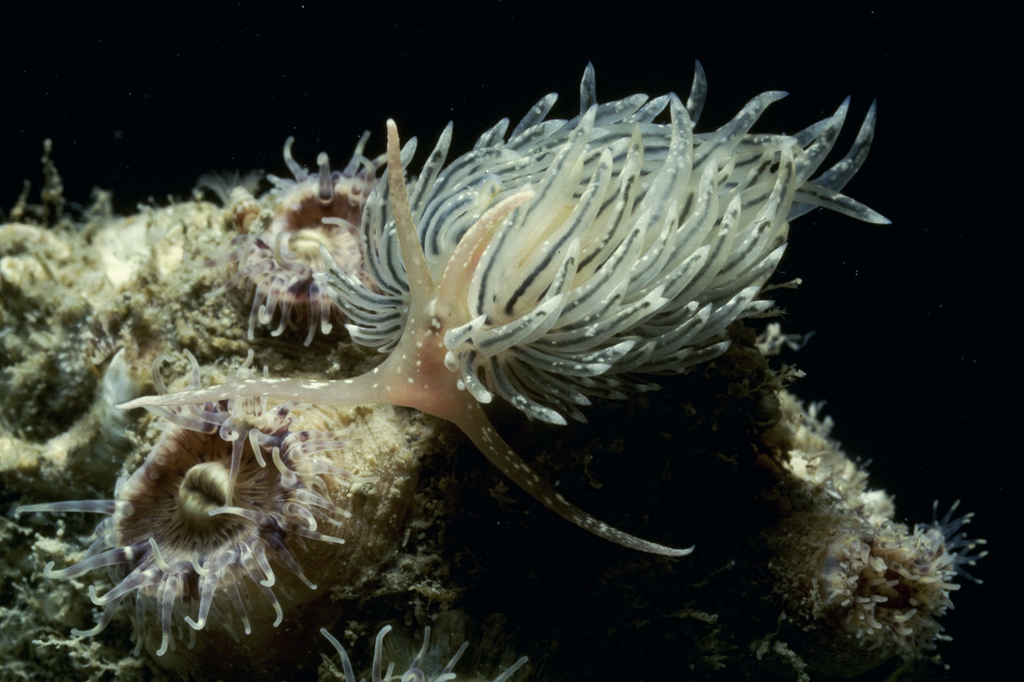

Scientific classification
- Kingdom: Animalia
- Phylum: Mollusca
- Class: Gastropoda
- Order: Nudibranchia
- Suborder: Aeolidacea
- Family: Facelinidae
- Genus: Facelina
- Species: F. dubia

Binomial name
- Facelina dubia Pruvot-Fol, 1948

= Facelina dubia =

Species of gastropod

Facelina dubia is a species of sea slug, an aeolid nudibranch, a marine gastropod mollusc in the family Facelinidae.

== Distribution ==
This species has been reported from County Cork, Ireland south to the Mediterranean Sea.
