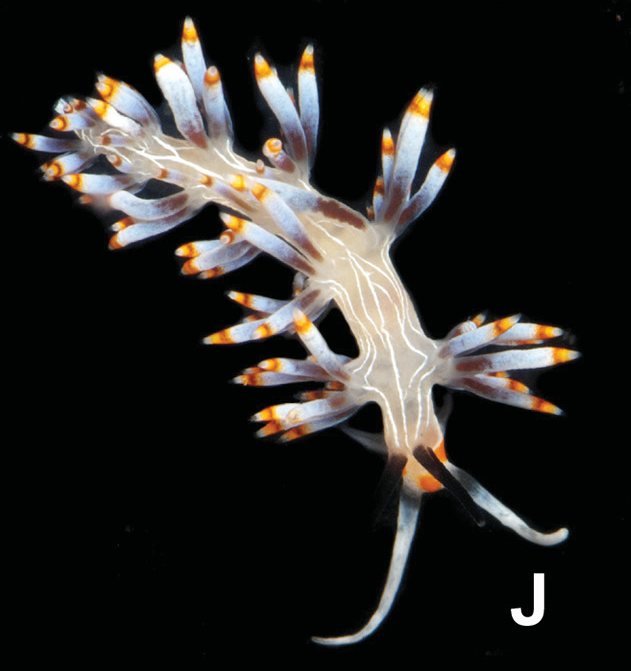

Scientific classification
- Kingdom: Animalia
- Phylum: Mollusca
- Class: Gastropoda
- Order: Nudibranchia
- Suborder: Aeolidacea
- Family: Facelinidae
- Genus: Facelina
- Species: F. lineata

Binomial name
- Facelina lineata Eliot, 1905

= Facelina lineata =

Species of gastropod

Facelina lineata is a species of sea slug, an aeolid nudibranch, a marine gastropod mollusc in the family Facelinidae.

== Distribution ==
This species has been reported from Tanzania and India.
