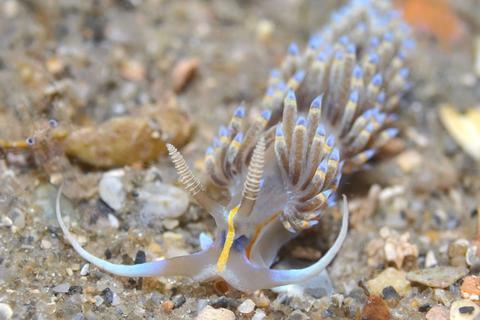
- A live individual of Dondice occidentalis

Scientific classification
- Domain: Eukaryota
- Kingdom: Animalia
- Phylum: Mollusca
- Class: Gastropoda
- Order: Nudibranchia
- Suborder: Cladobranchia
- Family: Myrrhinidae
- Genus: Dondice
- Species: D. occidentalis

Binomial name
- Dondice occidentalis Engel, 1925

= Dondice occidentalis =

Species of gastropod

Dondice occidentalis is a species of sea slug, an aeolid nudibranch, a marine gastropod mollusc in the family Myrrhinidae.

== Taxonomy ==
According to Gonzalez et al. (2013), Dondice occidentalis and Dondice parguerensis probably represent an example of incipient sympatric speciation. Molecular analyses support partially the differentiation of these species, but were inconclusive, being based only on two genes which are less variable than the COI barcoding gene normally used to distinguish closely related species. Further research is needed in order to resolve this, but COI sequences on GenBank suggest that there could be three species within this species complex.

== Distribution ==
Distribution of Dondice occidentalis includes Florida, Mexico, Belize, Costa Rica, Colombia, Venezuela, Curaçao, Bonaire, Venezuela, Bermudas, Bahamas, Cayman Islands, Jamaica, Turks and Caicos, Grenada, Sint Maarten, Martinique, Trinidad, Brazil and Panama.

== Description ==
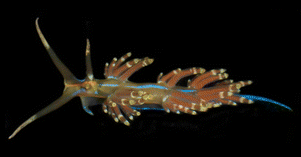
Dorsal view of Dondice occidentalis.

The body is elongate, tapering toward the posterior end. Rhinophores are annulate and long. Oral tentacles are longer than the rhinophores. Cerata are arranged in clusters along two rows on the dorsum. Background color is translucent gray with a yellow or orange median line of variable width, running from the head to the anterior end, between the rhinophores. There is sometimes present a white or blue broken line down the dorsal mid-line from behind the rhinophores to the posterior end of the body. Opaque white spots are sometimes present on the dorsum. Oral tentacles are translucent or light blue at the base, becoming white towards the tips. Cerata are translucent gray, often with large blue or white bands covering the upper two-thirds of each ceras. The maximum recorded body length is 50 mm.

== Habitat ==
Recorded at depths from the surface to 26 metres. This species was found on hydroids in Panama feeding on hydroids of the genus Eudendrium and apparently the bryozoan Amathia. It easily sheds the cerata when it is disturbed.
