= Marianina khaleesi =

Scientific classification
- Kingdom: Animalia
- Phylum: Mollusca
- Class: Gastropoda
- Order: Nudibranchia
- Suborder: Tritoniacea
- Family: Tritoniidae
- Genus: Marianina
- Species: M. khaleesi

Binomial name
- Marianina khaleesi (Silva, Azevedo & Matthews-Cascon, 2014)

Synonyms
- Tritonia khaleesi Silva, Azevedo & Matthews-Cascon, 2014

Species of gastropod

Marianina khaleesi is a species of sea slugs, a dendronotid nudibranch, a marine gastropod mollusc in the family Tritoniidae.

== Etymology ==
The specific name khaleesi is named after the title "Khaleesi" used by the fictional character Daenerys Targaryen in the fantasy novel series A Song of Ice and Fire. The discoverers chose the name because the silver-colored band on the back of the slug reminded them of the pale blond hair of the character as played by Emilia Clarke in the television adaptation Game of Thrones.

== Distribution ==
Marianina khaleesi was discovered off north-east Brazil in the South Atlantic Ocean and first described in 2013.

== Description ==
This species is up to 12 millimetres (0.47 in) long, with a slender white body, whose notum features a broad white band between the eyes and the tail. It is the only known Tritoniid with a unicuspid rachidian tooth in adult form.
