= Facelina carmelae =

Scientific classification
- Kingdom: Animalia
- Phylum: Mollusca
- Class: Gastropoda
- Order: Nudibranchia
- Suborder: Aeolidacea
- Family: Facelinidae
- Genus: Facelina
- Species: F. carmelae

Binomial name
- Facelina carmelae Moro & Ortea, 2015

Species of gastropod

Facelina carmelae is a species of sea slug, an aeolid nudibranch, a marine gastropod mollusc in the family Facelinidae.

== Distribution ==
This species has been reported from Cape Verde.
