= Facelina goslingii =

Scientific classification
- Kingdom: Animalia
- Phylum: Mollusca
- Class: Gastropoda
- Order: Nudibranchia
- Suborder: Aeolidacea
- Family: Facelinidae
- Genus: Facelina
- Species: F. goslingii

Binomial name
- Facelina goslingii A. E. Verrill, 1901

Species of gastropod

Facelina goslingii is a species of sea slug, an aeolid nudibranch, a marine gastropod mollusc in the family Facelinidae.

== Distribution ==
This species was described from Bermuda.
