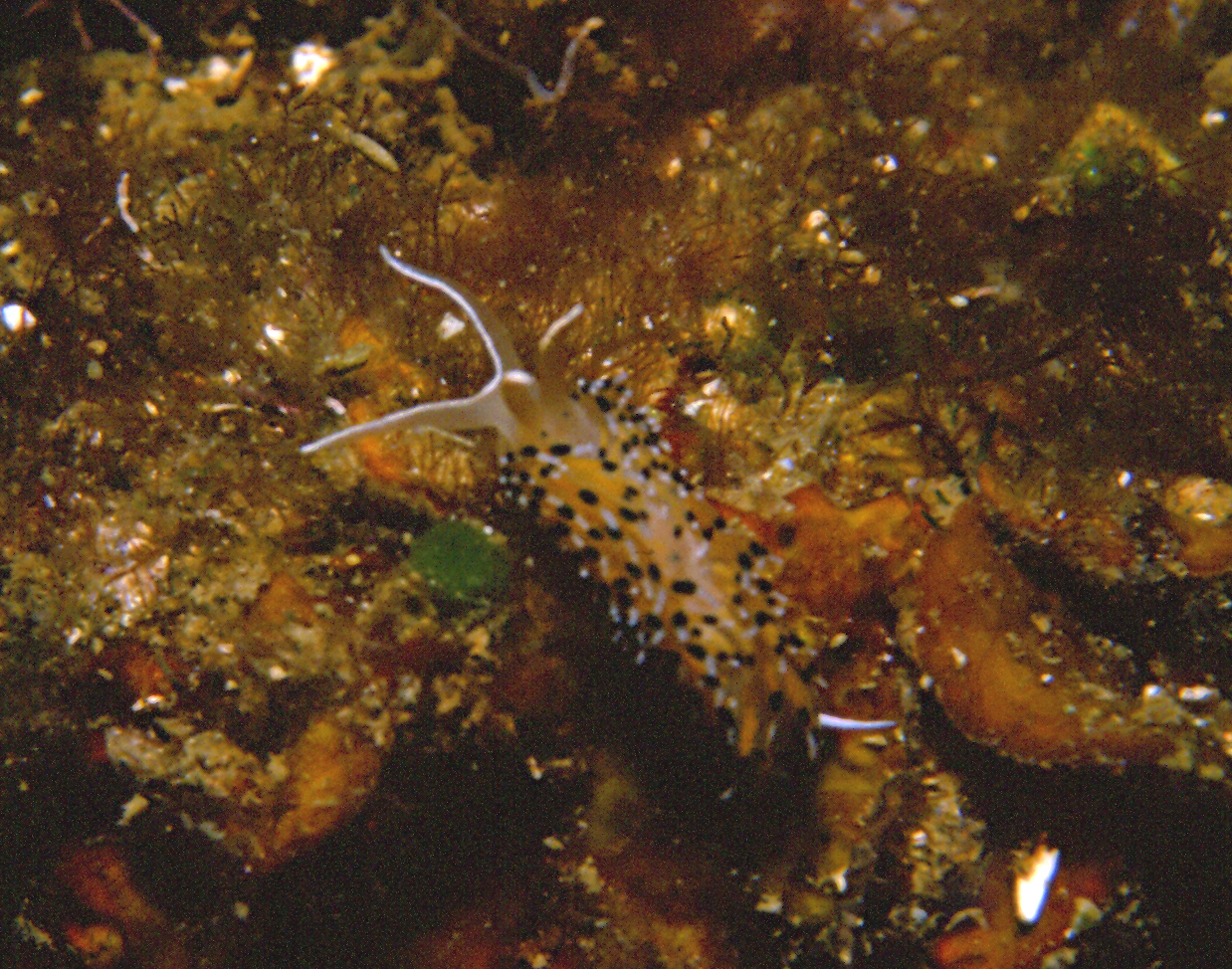

Scientific classification
- Kingdom: Animalia
- Phylum: Mollusca
- Class: Gastropoda
- Order: Nudibranchia
- Suborder: Aeolidacea
- Family: Facelinidae
- Genus: Caloria
- Species: C. elegans

Binomial name
- Caloria elegans (Alder & Hancock, 1845)

Synonyms
- Caloria maculata Trinchese, 1888 (type species); Eolis elegans Alder & Hancock, 1845 (basionym)

= Caloria elegans =

Species of gastropod

Caloria elegans is a species of colorful sea slug, an aeolid nudibranch, a marine gastropod mollusc in the family Facelinidae.

== Taxonomy ==
Facelina quatrefagesi was considered as a synonym of Caloria elegans, but it is morphologically very similar and different valid species.

== Description ==
The size of the body varies between 20 mm and 35 mm.

(Original description) The body is slender and subpellucid, with a yellowish-white tint. The oral tentacles are long and tapering, and an opaque white line runs down each one and continues across the front of the head. The dorsal tentacles are not more than half as long as the oral ones; they are stout, erect, tapering toward the tip, and wrinkled, with a pale fawn or buff coloration.

The branchiae are numerous, slender, and nearly linear, and they are arranged in about seven dense clusters on each side. The first cluster is large and comes very close to the dorsal tentacles, while the remaining clusters diminish gradually and extend almost to the tail. They are deep rosy flesh-colored, and each is marked above and below by a dark patch of purplish brown, almost black, with a ring of white above the apex. The foot is slender and extends into longish angles at the sides.

== Distribution ==
This marine species occurs in European waters from the British Isles to the Mediterranean Sea; also off the Canary Islands, the Azores, and Madeira.
