= Yellow-tipped nudibranch =

Scientific classification
- Kingdom: Animalia
- Phylum: Mollusca
- Class: Gastropoda
- Order: Nudibranchia
- Suborder: Aeolidacea
- Family: Facelinidae
- Genus: Caloria
- Species: C. sp. 2

Binomial name
- Caloria sp. 2

Species of gastropod

The yellow-tipped nudibranch, Caloria sp. 2, as designated by Gosliner, 1987, is a species of sea slug, specifically an aeolid nudibranch, a marine gastropod mollusc in the family Facelinidae.

== Distribution ==
This species is endemic to the South African coast and is found only on the Atlantic coast of the Cape Peninsula in 10–30 m of water. As at November 2009, it remained undescribed by science.

== Description ==
The yellow-tipped nudibranch grows to 30 mm in total length. It is a slender pale-bodied aeolid with numerous lavender cerata with yellow tips. Its head bears perfoliate orange rhinophores and a pair of oral tentacles which have an orange band in their midsection.

== Ecology ==
This aeolid feeds on hydroids. In common with other aeolid nudibranchs, the cerata of black-dot nudibranch aid in respiration but also contain extensions of the digestive system. The nudibranch eats the hydroid and passes its nematocysts unharmed through its digestive system to the tips of its cerata. Here the nematocysts mature and are then used by the nudibranch for its own defence. It is probable that the bright colours of the black-dot nudibranch serve to advertise to predators that it is toxic.
