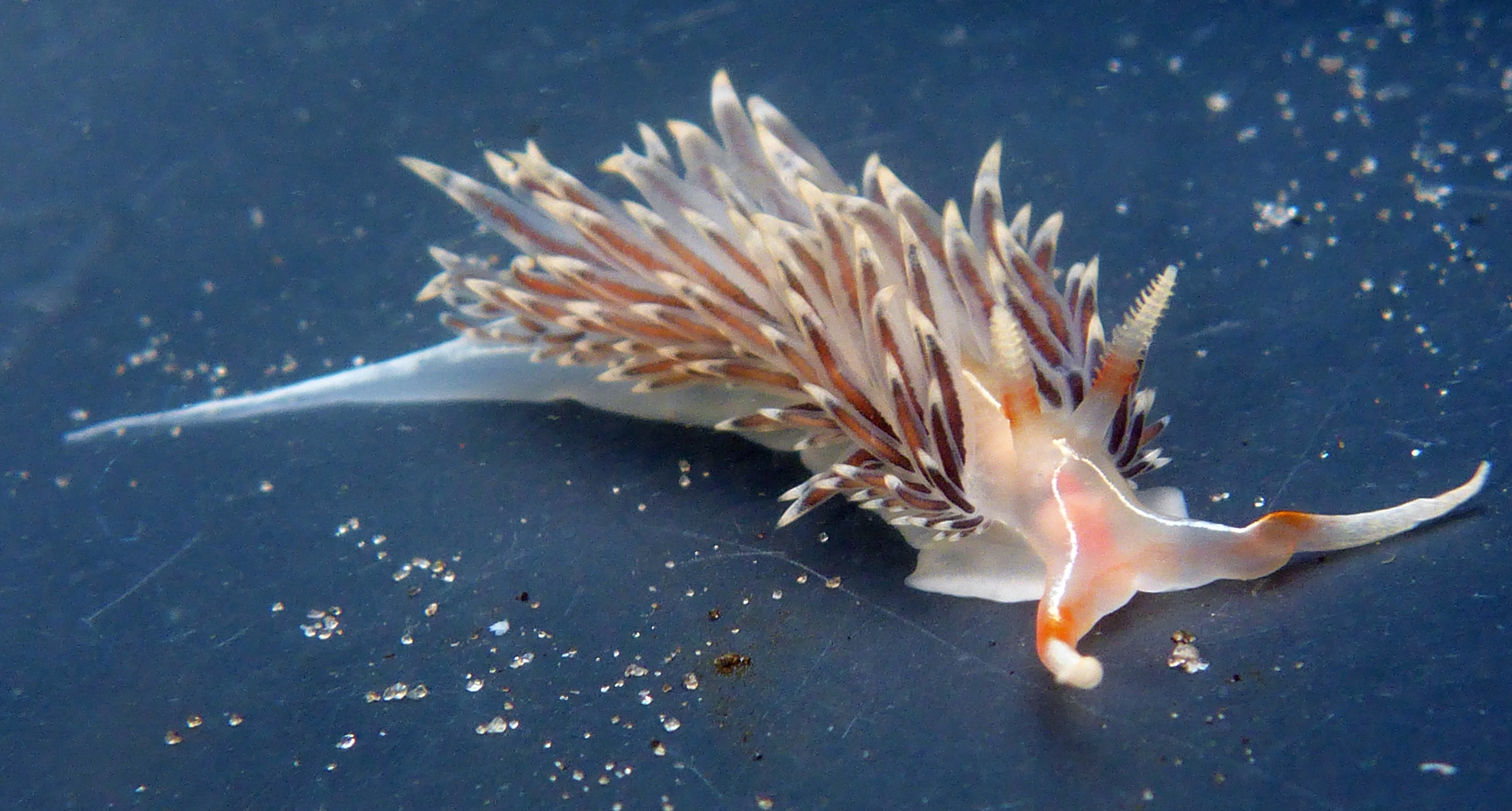
- Phidiana lynceus from Port Canaveral, Florida
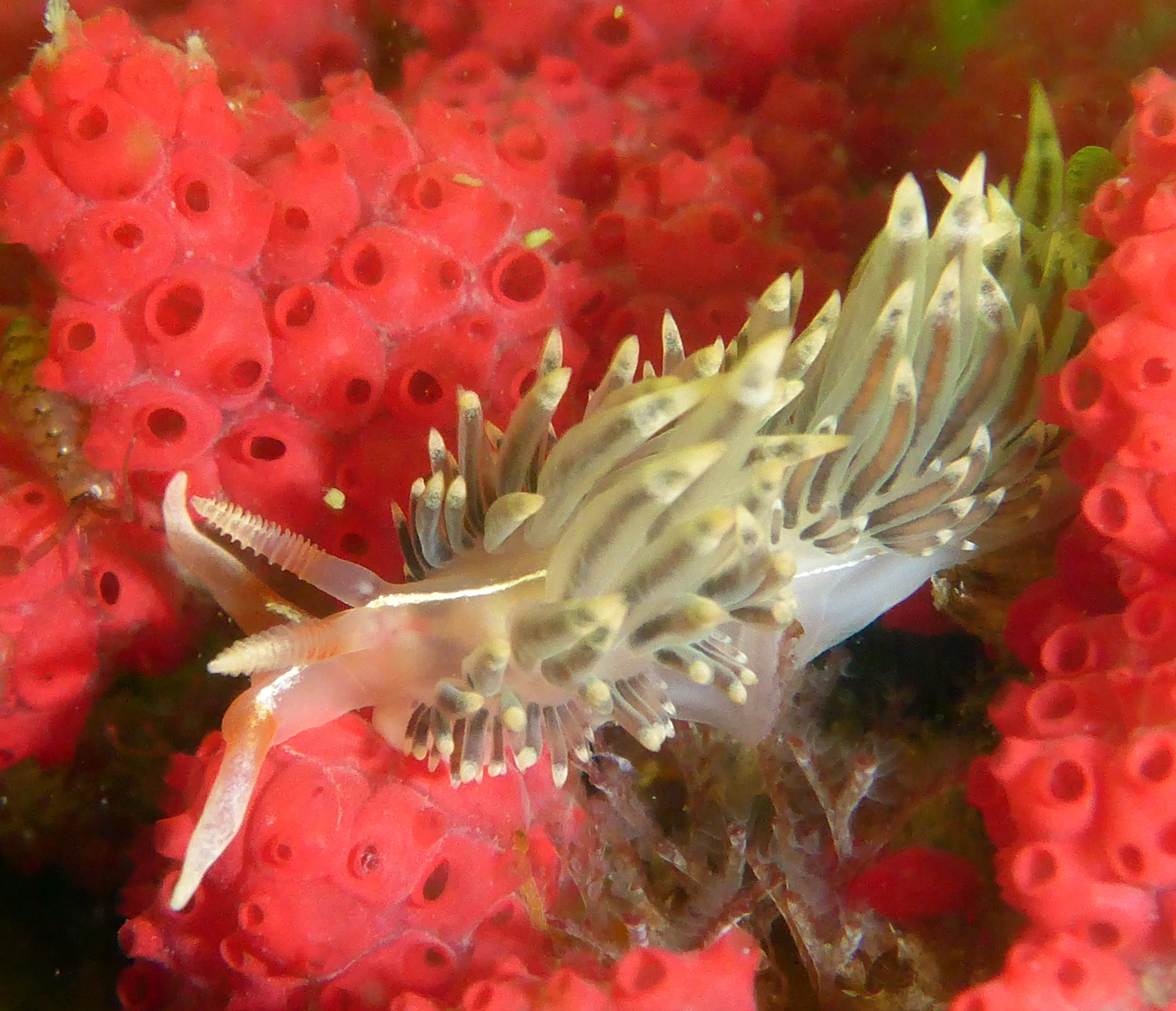
- Phidiana lynceus from Port Canaveral, Florida on tunicates

Scientific classification
- Kingdom: Animalia
- Phylum: Mollusca
- Class: Gastropoda
- Order: Nudibranchia
- Suborder: Aeolidacea
- Family: Facelinidae
- Genus: Phidiana
- Species: P. lynceus

Binomial name
- Phidiana lynceus Bergh, 1867

Synonyms
- Phidiana brevicauda Engel, 1925; Phidiana selencae Bergh, 1879

= Phidiana lynceus =

Species of gastropod

Phidiana lynceus is a species of sea slug in the genus Phidiana, an aeolidina nudibranch, a marine gastropod mollusc in the family Facelinidae.

== Distribution ==
The slug is found in the Caribbean and occasionally in Ghana and on the Pacific coast of Panama. It is also recorded off the Canary Islands.
