= Black-dot nudibranch =

Scientific classification
- Kingdom: Animalia
- Phylum: Mollusca
- Class: Gastropoda
- Order: Nudibranchia
- Suborder: Aeolidacea
- Family: Facelinidae
- Genus: Caloria
- Species: C. sp. 1

Binomial name
- Caloria sp. 1

Species of gastropod

The black-dot nudibranch, Caloria sp. 1, as designated by Gosliner, 1987, is a species of sea slug, specifically an aeolid nudibranch. They are marine gastropod molluscs in the family Facelinidae.

== Distribution ==
This species is endemic to the South African coast and is found only from the Atlantic coast of the Cape Peninsula to the eastern side of False Bay in 5–15 m of water. As at November 2009, it remained undescribed by science.

== Description ==
The black-dot nudibranch grows to 20 mm in total length. It is a slender-bodied aeolid with a red head bearing perfoliate rhinophores and a pair of pale-tipped oral tentacles. It has brick-red cerata with white tips which have a black spot just below the white tip.

== Ecology ==
This aeolid feeds on hydroids. In common with other aeolid nudibranchs, the cerata of black-dot nudibranch aid in respiration but also contain extensions of the digestive system. The nudibranch eats the hydroid and passes its nematocysts unharmed through its digestive system to the tips of its cerata. Here the nematocysts mature and are then used by the nudibranch for its own defence. It is probable that the bright colours of the black-dot nudibranch serve to advertise to predators that it is toxic.

The black-dot nudibranch is hermaphrodite. The egg mass is highly convoluted and cream to yellowish.
