= Pruvotfolia rochebruni =

Scientific classification
- Kingdom: Animalia
- Phylum: Mollusca
- Class: Gastropoda
- Order: Nudibranchia
- Suborder: Aeolidacea
- Family: Facelinidae
- Genus: Pruvotfolia
- Species: P. rochebruni

Binomial name
- Pruvotfolia rochebruni Ortea, Moro & Caballer, 2002

Species of gastropod

Pruvotfolia rochebruni is a species of sea slug, an aeolid nudibranch, a marine gastropod mollusc in the family Facelinidae.

== Distribution ==
This species was described from the Cape Verde Islands.
