= Facelina annulicornis =

Scientific classification
- Kingdom: Animalia
- Phylum: Mollusca
- Class: Gastropoda
- Order: Nudibranchia
- Suborder: Aeolidacea
- Family: Facelinidae
- Genus: Facelina
- Species: F. annulicornis

Binomial name
- Facelina annulicornis (Chamisso & Eysenhardt, 1821)

Synonyms
- Eolidia annulicornis Chamisso & Eysenhardt, 1821; Eolidia punctata Alder & Hancock, 1845

Species of gastropod

Facelina annulicornis is a species of sea slugs, an aeolid nudibranch, a marine gastropod mollusc in the family Facelinidae.

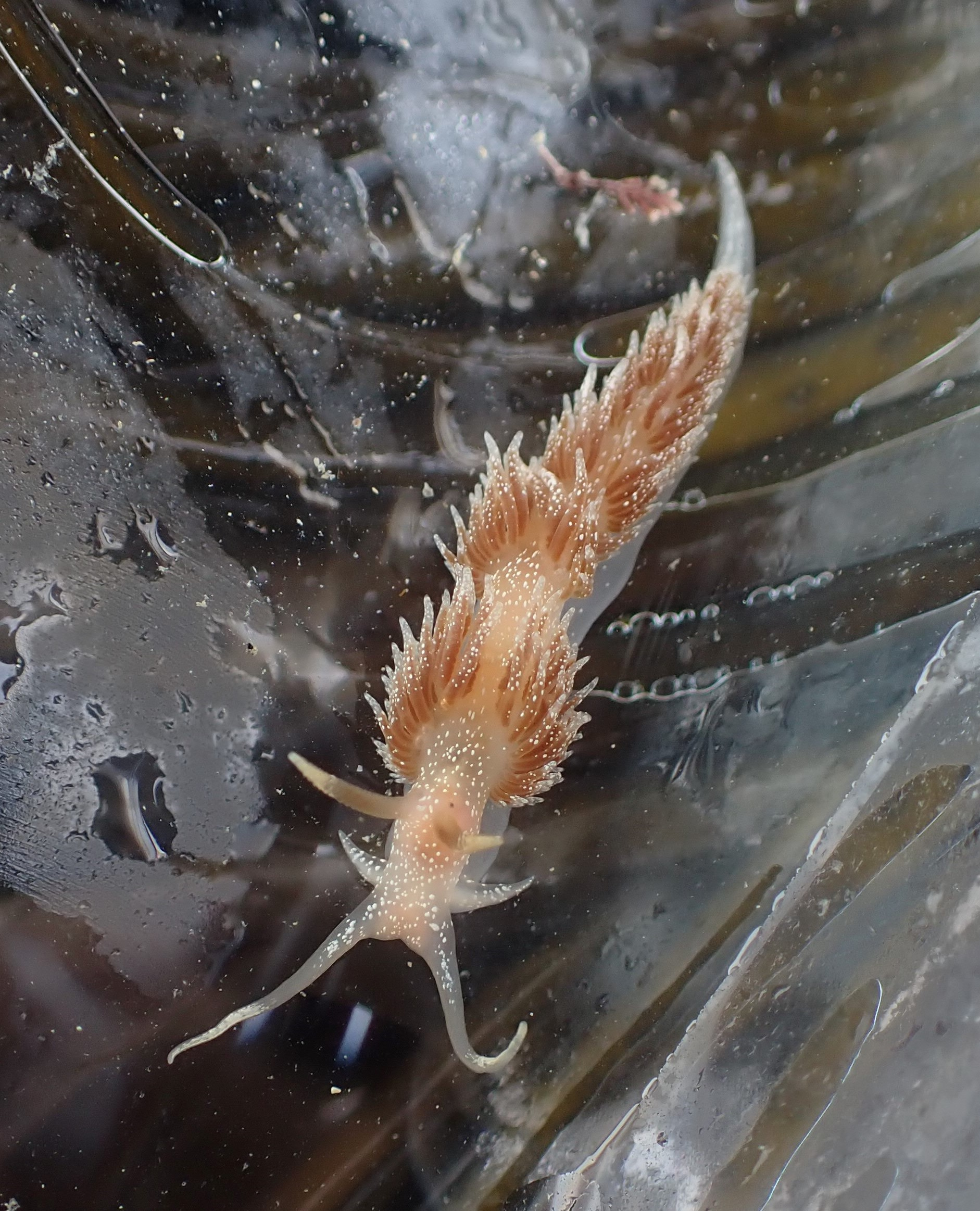
Facelina annulicornis, Brittany, France.

== Distribution ==
This species has been reported from County Donegal, Ireland south to Portugal and the Mediterranean Sea.

== Ecology ==
Facelina annulicornis is a predator of the hydroid Halecium halecium and probably other hydroids and possibly other aeolid nudibranchs.
