= Caloria guenanti =

Scientific classification
- Kingdom: Animalia
- Phylum: Mollusca
- Class: Gastropoda
- Order: Nudibranchia
- Suborder: Aeolidacea
- Family: Facelinidae
- Genus: Caloria
- Species: C. guenanti

Binomial name
- Caloria guenanti (Risbec, 1928)

Synonyms
- Aeolidia guenanti Risbec, 1928

Species of gastropod

Caloria guenanti is a species of sea slug, an aeolid nudibranch, a marine gastropod mollusc in the family Facelinidae.

== Distribution ==
This species was described from New Caledonia.
