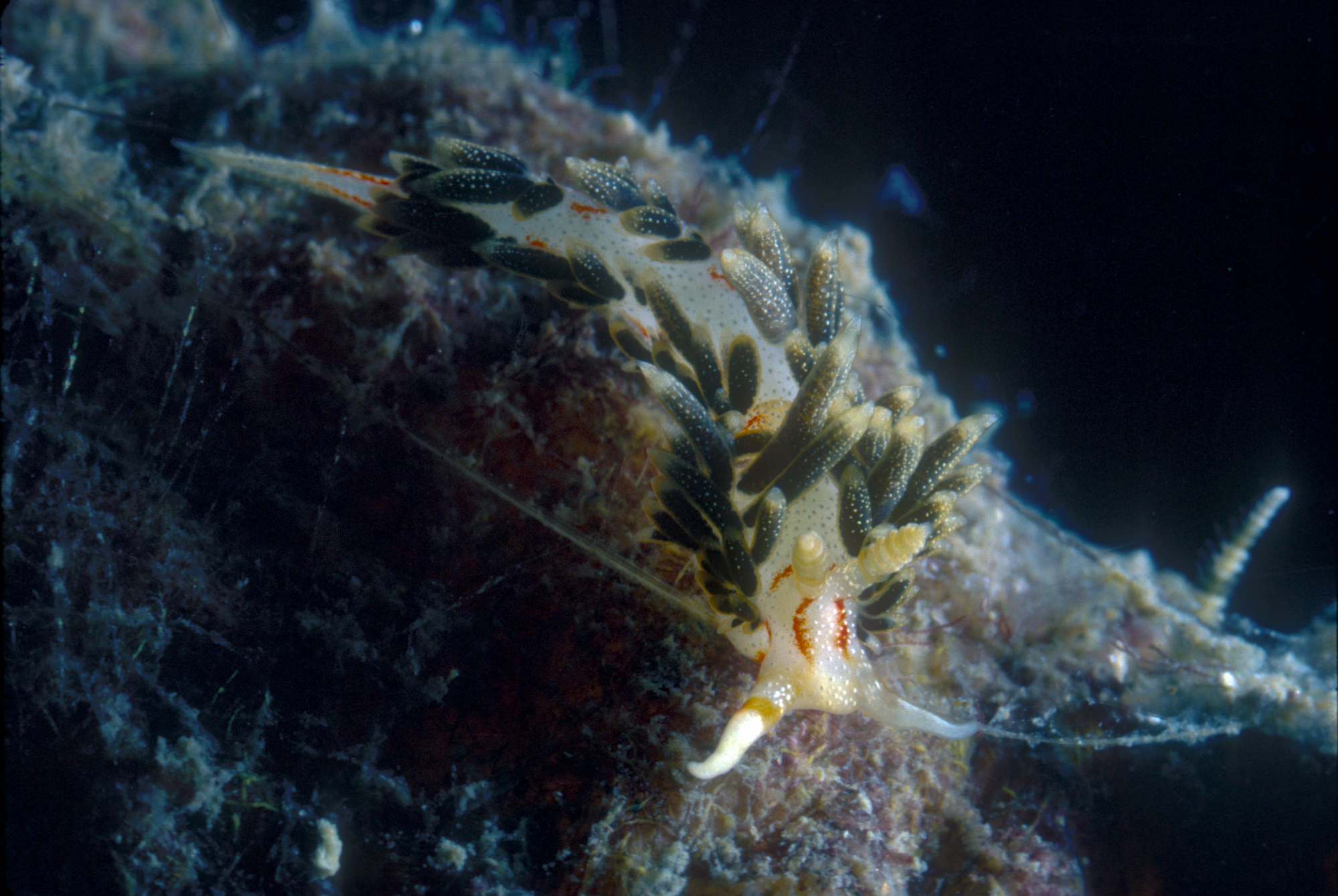
- Mirs Bay, Hong Kong, China

Scientific classification
- Kingdom: Animalia
- Phylum: Mollusca
- Class: Gastropoda
- Order: Nudibranchia
- Suborder: Aeolidacea
- Family: Facelinidae
- Genus: Phidiana
- Species: P. anulifera

Binomial name
- Phidiana anulifera (Baba, 1949)

= Phidiana anulifera =

Species of gastropod

Phidiana anulifera is a species of sea slug, a nudibranch, a marine, gastropod mollusc in the family Facelinidae.

== Distribution ==
This species was described from Sagami Bay, Japan. It is also known from Hong Kong.
