= Dondice galaxiana =

Scientific classification
- Kingdom: Animalia
- Phylum: Mollusca
- Class: Gastropoda
- Order: Nudibranchia
- Suborder: Aeolidacea
- Family: Myrrhinidae
- Genus: Dondice
- Species: D. galaxiana

Binomial name
- Dondice galaxiana Millen & Hermosillo, 2012

Species of gastropod

Dondice galaxiana is a species of colourful sea slug, an aeolid nudibranch, a marine gastropod mollusc in the family Myrrhinidae.

== Distribution ==
This species was described from Puerto Vallarta, Noche Iguana, Bahía de Banderas, on the Pacific Ocean coast of Mexico. Additional specimens from Clipperton Island and Costa Rica were included in the original description.
