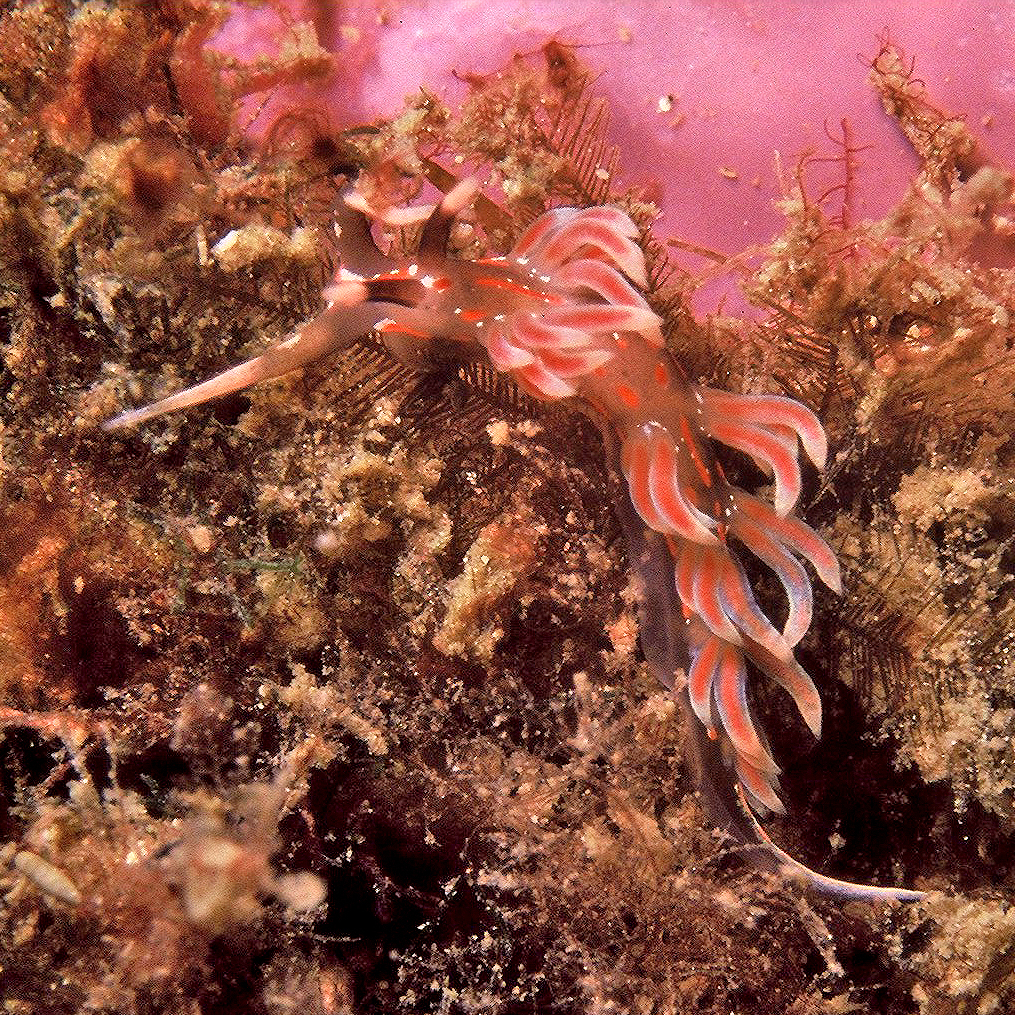

Scientific classification
- Domain: Eukaryota
- Kingdom: Animalia
- Phylum: Mollusca
- Class: Gastropoda
- Order: Nudibranchia
- Suborder: Cladobranchia
- Family: Facelinidae
- Genus: Facelina
- Species: F. rubrovittata

Binomial name
- Facelina rubrovittata (A. Costa, 1866)

= Facelina rubrovittata =

Species of gastropod

Facelina rubrovittata is a species of sea slug, an aeolid nudibranch in the family Facelinidae.

== Distribution ==
This species occurs in the Mediterranean Sea.
