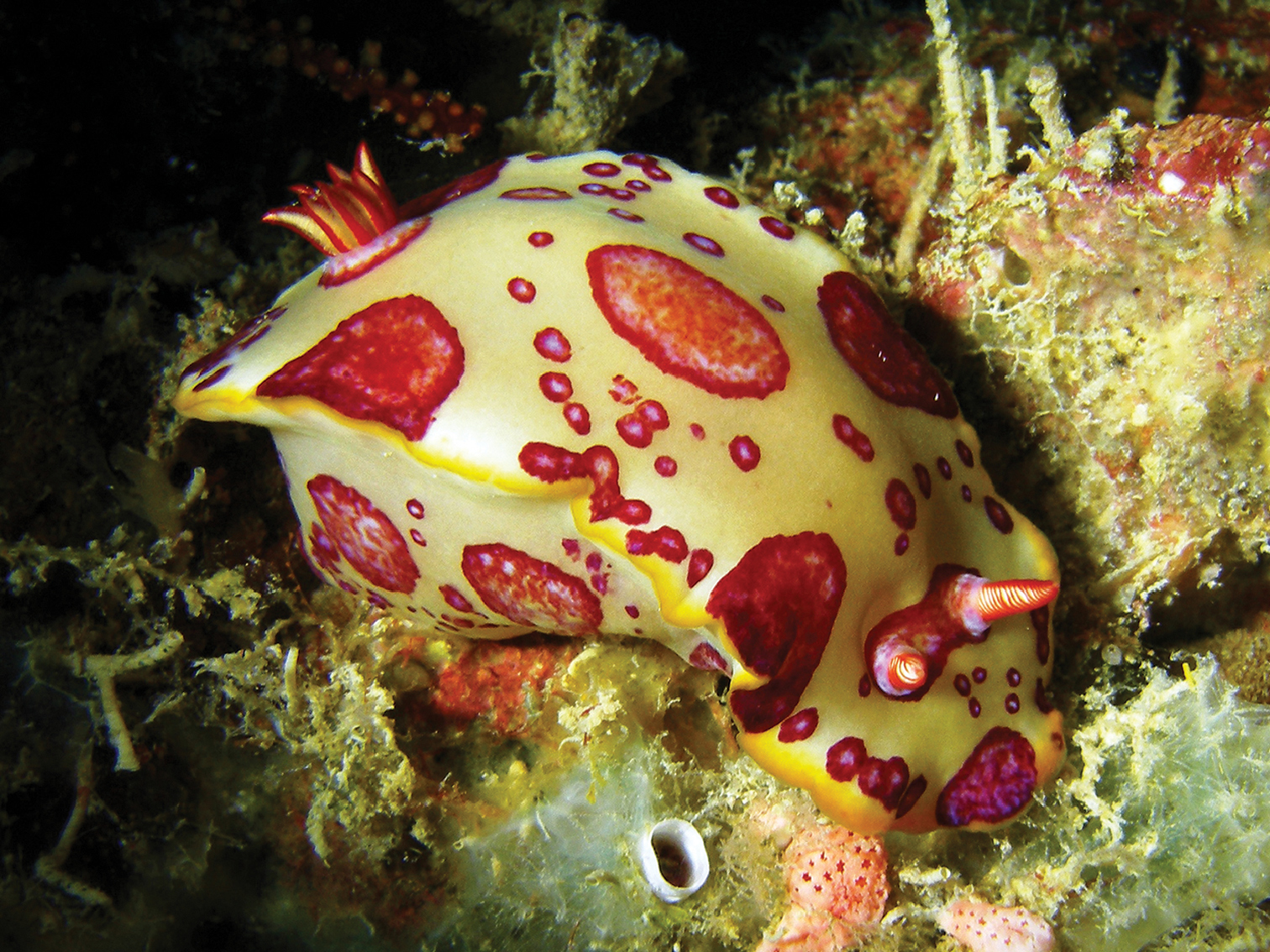
- Hypselodoris dollfusi

Scientific classification
- Kingdom: Animalia
- Phylum: Mollusca
- Class: Gastropoda
- Order: Nudibranchia
- Family: Chromodorididae
- Genus: Hypselodoris
- Species: H. dollfusi

Binomial name
- Hypselodoris dollfusi (Pruvot-Fol, 1933)

Synonyms
- Glossodoris dollfusi Pruvot-Fol, 1933

= Hypselodoris dollfusi =

Species of gastropod

Hypselodoris dollfusi is a species of colourful sea slug or dorid nudibranch, a marine gastropod mollusc in the family Chromodorididae. After being described initially in 1933 by Pruvot-Fol, this species was not seen again until its rediscovery in 2000 in the Sea of Khorfakkan, United Arab Emirates.

== Distribution ==
This nudibranch is found in the Gulf of Suez, the Gulf of Aqaba and the Northern Indian Ocean.

== Description ==
Hypselodoris dollfusi has a white body and a yellow edged mantle. There are very prominent red-ringed purple spots on its dorsum. The gills and rhinophores are white, lined with red. There are slight colour variations among individuals in this species. This nudibranch can reach a total length of at least 50 mm.
