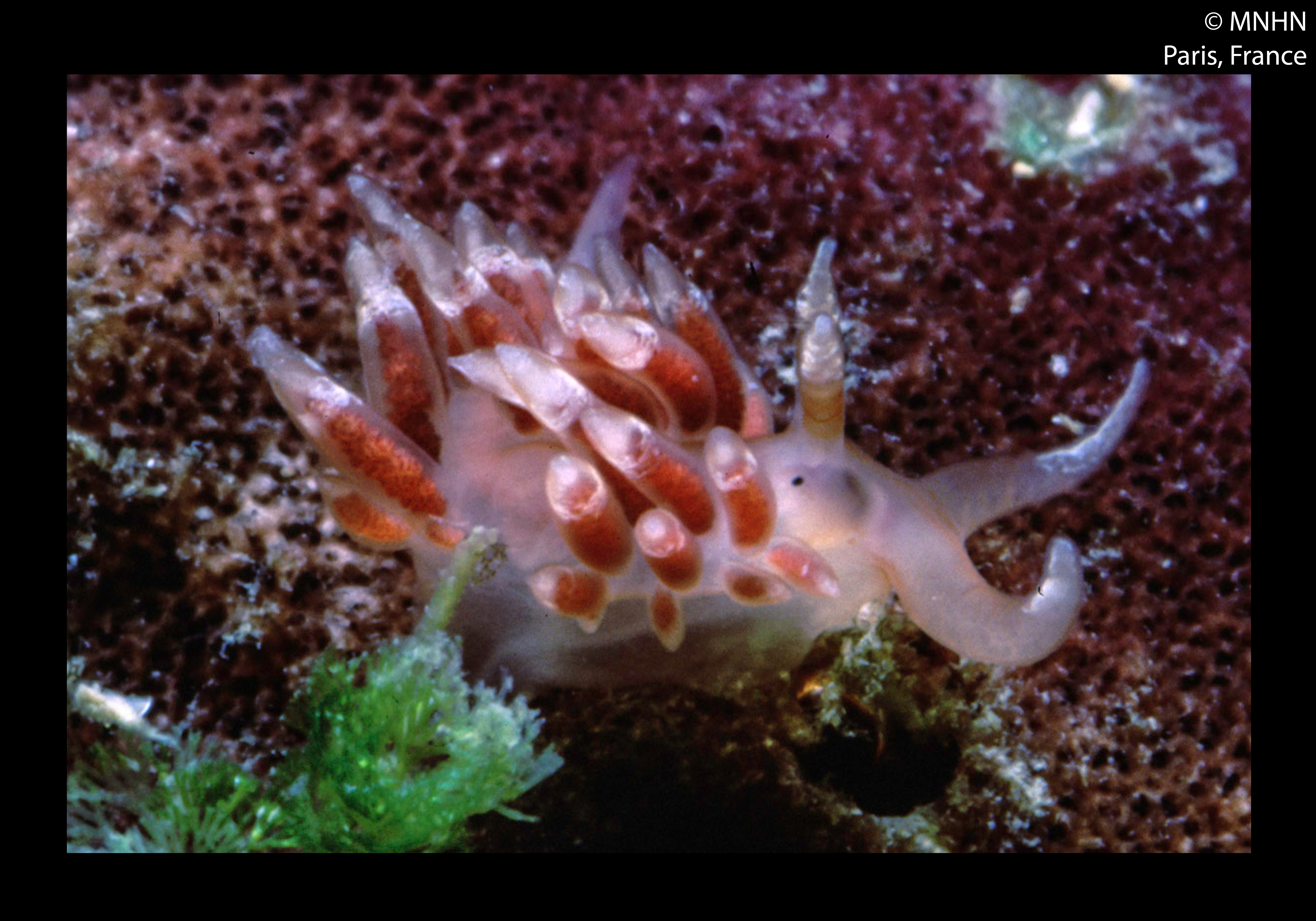
- Phidiana adiuncta (holotype at MNHN, Paris)

Scientific classification
- Kingdom: Animalia
- Phylum: Mollusca
- Class: Gastropoda
- Order: Nudibranchia
- Suborder: Aeolidacea
- Family: Facelinidae
- Genus: Phidiana
- Species: P. adiuncta

Binomial name
- Phidiana adiuncta Ortea, Caballer & Moro, 2004

= Phidiana adiuncta =

Species of gastropod

Phidiana adiuncta is a species of sea slug, a nudibranch, in the family Facelinidae.

== Description ==
The length of this marine species is 13 mm (0.5 in).

== Distribution ==
This species was described from Punta Mona, on the Caribbean Sea coast of Costa Rica.
