= Phidiana lascrucensis =

Scientific classification
- Kingdom: Animalia
- Phylum: Mollusca
- Class: Gastropoda
- Order: Nudibranchia
- Suborder: Aeolidacea
- Family: Facelinidae
- Genus: Phidiana
- Species: P. lascrucensis

Binomial name
- Phidiana lascrucensis Bertsch & Ferreira, 1974

Species of gastropod

Phidiana lascrucensis is a species of sea slug, a nudibranch, a marine, gastropod mollusc in the family Facelinidae.

== Distribution ==
This species was described from Bahia Las Cruces, Baja California del Sur, Mexico, 24°13′N 110°05′W. It has been reported from the central Gulf of California (Bahia Bacochibampo, Sonora, Mexico) south to the Golfo de Nicoya, Costa Rica.
