= Pruvotfolia pselliotes =

Scientific classification
- Kingdom: Animalia
- Phylum: Mollusca
- Class: Gastropoda
- Order: Nudibranchia
- Suborder: Aeolidacea
- Family: Facelinidae
- Genus: Pruvotfolia
- Species: P. pselliotes

Binomial name
- Pruvotfolia pselliotes (Labbé, 1923)

Synonyms
- Acanthopsole pselliotes Labbé, 1923 (basionym); Rolandia hispanica Pruvot-Fol, 1951

Species of gastropod

Pruvotfolia pselliotes is a species of sea slug, an aeolid nudibranch, a marine gastropod mollusc in the family Facelinidae.

== Distribution ==
This species was described from Le Croisic, Atlantic coast of France. It has been reported from Spain, Malta, Senegal and Turkey.
