= Nanuca sebastiani =

Scientific classification
- Kingdom: Animalia
- Phylum: Mollusca
- Class: Gastropoda
- Order: Nudibranchia
- Suborder: Aeolidacea
- Family: Myrrhinidae
- Genus: Nanuca
- Species: N. sebastiani

Binomial name
- Nanuca sebastiani Marcus, Er., 1957

Species of gastropod

Nanuca sebastiani is a species of sea slug, specifically an aeolid nudibranch. It is a marine gastropod mollusc in the family Myrrhinidae.

== Distribution ==
The holotype of this species was found at Recife, State of Pernambuco, Brazil. It has been reported from Florida, Cuba and Brazil and Costa Rica as well as the Cape Verde Islands in the Eastern Atlantic Ocean.
