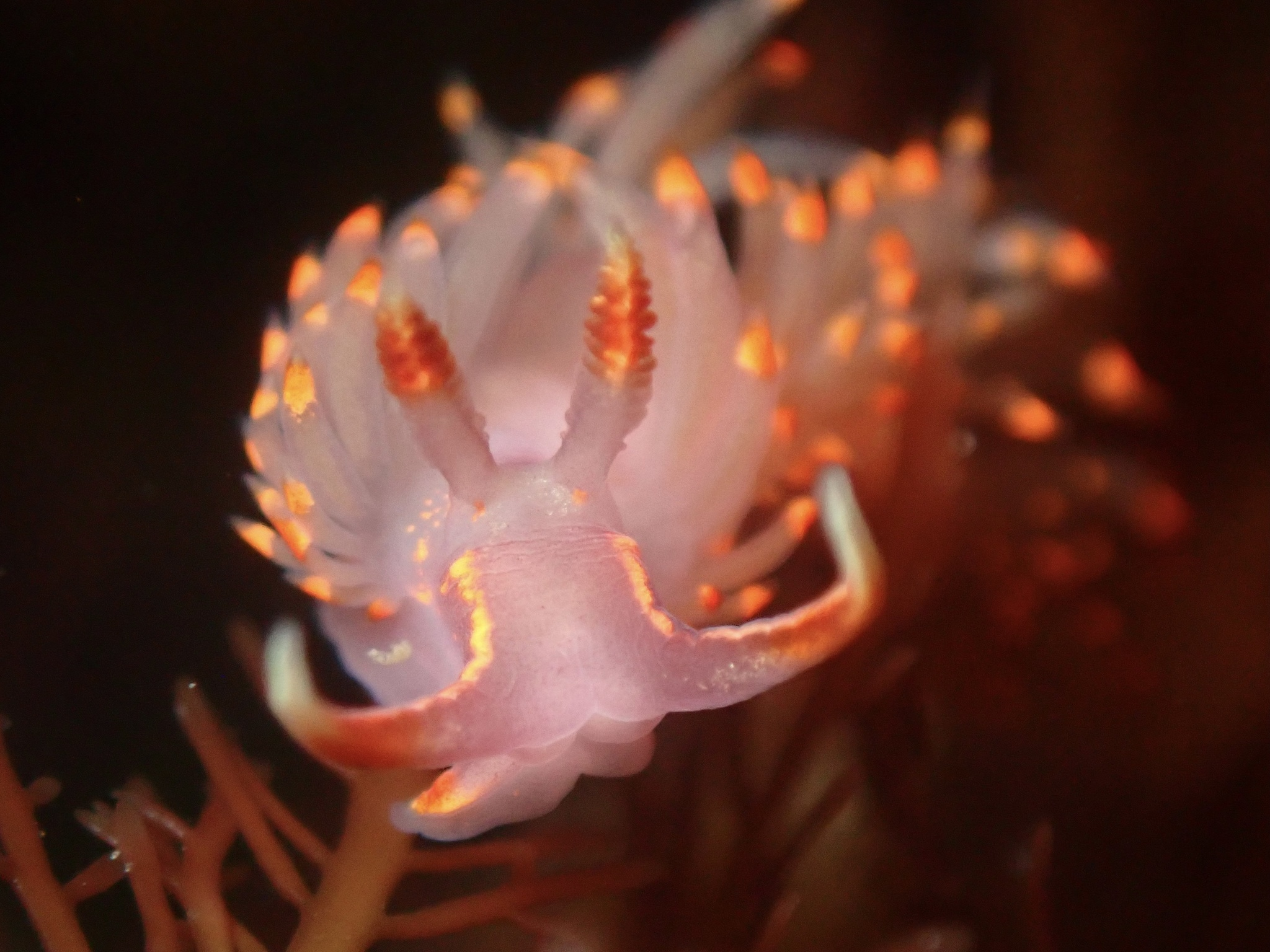

Scientific classification
- Kingdom: Animalia
- Phylum: Mollusca
- Class: Gastropoda
- Order: Nudibranchia
- Suborder: Aeolidacea
- Family: Facelinidae
- Genus: Austraeolis
- Species: A. stearnsi

Binomial name
- Austraeolis stearnsi (Cockerell, 1901)

Synonyms
- Facelina stearnsi Cockerell, 1901

= Austraeolis stearnsi =

Species of gastropod

Austraeolis stearnsi is a species of sea slug, an aeolid nudibranch, a marine gastropod mollusc in the family Facelinidae.

== Description ==
The length of the body attains 25 mm. The brilliant orange or yellowish colors are quite distinctive. It has long foot corners and oral tentacles. The radular teeth formula is 21-26 x 0.1.0, and the teeth are typically aeolid hydroid-eating shaped.

== Distribution ==
This species was described from California and Mexico.
