= Dondice parguerensis =

Scientific classification
- Domain: Eukaryota
- Kingdom: Animalia
- Phylum: Mollusca
- Class: Gastropoda
- Order: Nudibranchia
- Suborder: Cladobranchia
- Family: Myrrhinidae
- Genus: Dondice
- Species: D. parguerensis

Binomial name
- Dondice parguerensis Brandon & Cutress, 1985

Species of gastropod

Dondice parguerensis is a species of colourful sea slug, an aeolid nudibranch, a marine gastropod mollusc in the family Myrrhinidae.

== Distribution ==
This species was described from Puerto Rico. It has been reported from Belize.
