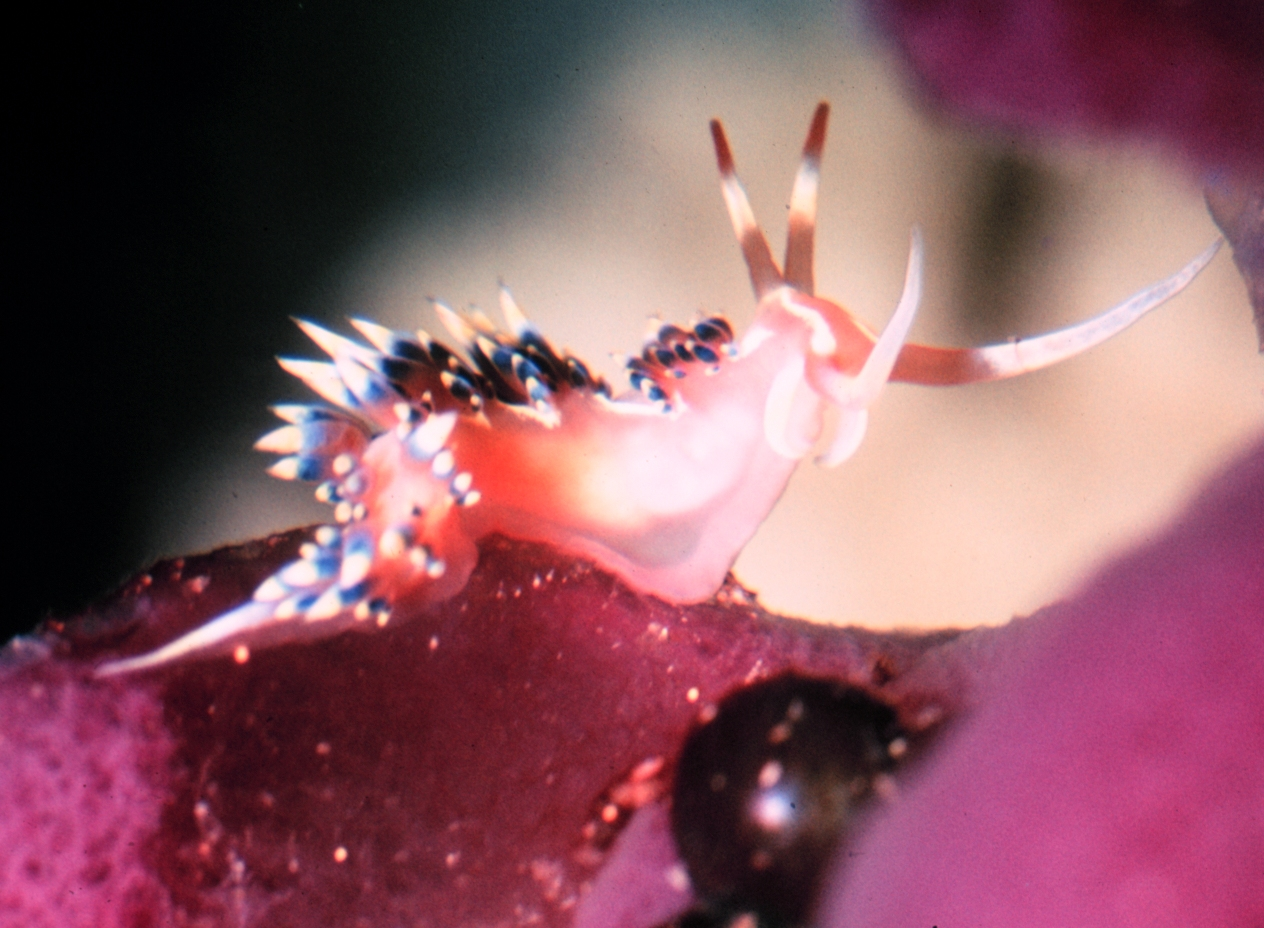

Scientific classification
- Kingdom: Animalia
- Phylum: Mollusca
- Class: Gastropoda
- Order: Nudibranchia
- Suborder: Aeolidacea
- Family: Facelinidae
- Genus: Caloria
- Species: C. indica

Binomial name
- Caloria indica (Bergh, 1896)

Synonyms
- Aeolidia dangeri Risbec, J., 1928; Learchis indica Bergh 1896; Phidiana indica (Bergh, 1896)

= Caloria indica =

Species of gastropod

Caloria indica is a species of sea slug, an aeolid nudibranch, a marine gastropod mollusc in the family Facelinidae.

== Description ==
The size of the body varies between 25 mm and 50 mm. Its body is covered in cerata, which it can detach to distract or harm a predator.

== Distribution ==
This species was described from Ambon Island, Indonesia. It occurs in the Indo-West Pacific from East Africa to Hawaii; also as an invasive species in the Israeli part of the Mediterranean Sea, first recorded in the late 1980s and then again in 2016.
