= Pruvotfolia rhodopos =

Scientific classification
- Kingdom: Animalia
- Phylum: Mollusca
- Class: Gastropoda
- Order: Nudibranchia
- Suborder: Aeolidacea
- Family: Facelinidae
- Genus: Pruvotfolia
- Species: P. rhodopos

Binomial name
- Pruvotfolia rhodopos (Yonow, 2000)

Synonyms
- Facelina rhodopos Yonow, 2000

Species of gastropod

Pruvotfolia rhodopos is a species of sea slug, an aeolid nudibranch, a marine gastropod mollusc in the family Facelinidae.

== Distribution ==
Originally described from the Red Sea. This species has been reported from Reunion Island, the Philippines, Marshall Islands, Malaysia and Japan.
