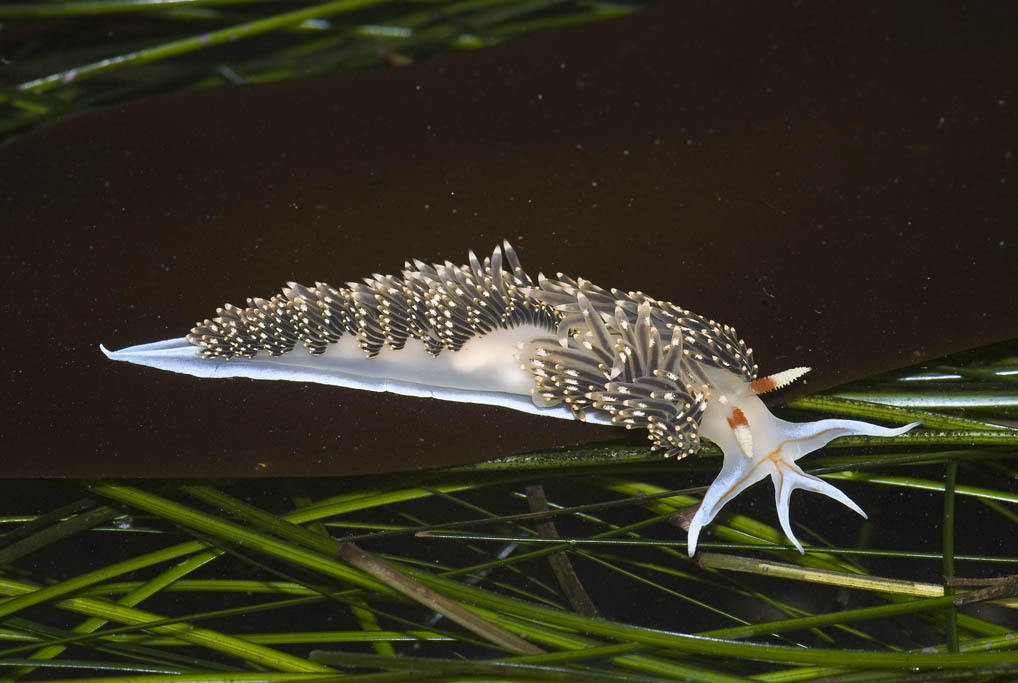

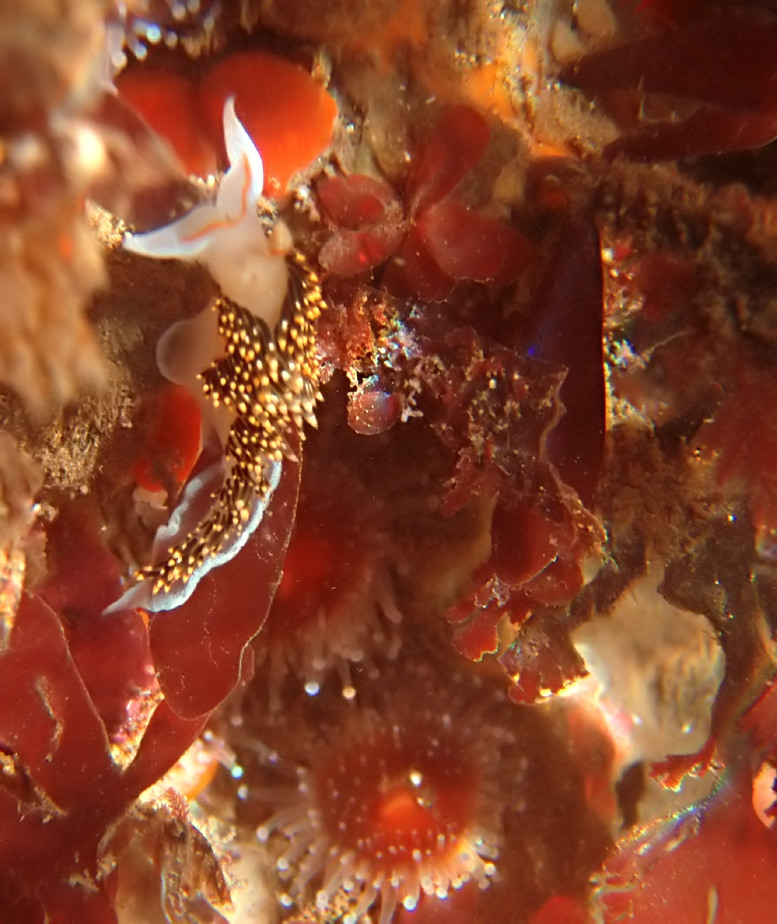
- Phidiana hiltoni in a Central California tide pool

Scientific classification
- Kingdom: Animalia
- Phylum: Mollusca
- Class: Gastropoda
- Order: Nudibranchia
- Suborder: Aeolidacea
- Family: Facelinidae
- Genus: Phidiana
- Species: P. hiltoni

Binomial name
- Phidiana hiltoni O'Donoghue, 1927

Synonyms
- Phidiana nigra MacFarland, 1966; Phidiana pugnax Lance, 1962

= Phidiana hiltoni =

Species of gastropod

Phidiana hiltoni is a species of sea slug, an aeolid nudibranch, a shell-less marine gastropod mollusc in the family Facelinidae.

== Distribution ==
This species has a rather limited range of distribution, being found from the central California coast to Baja California, Mexico, and it is also found in the Gulf of Mexico. Recently, its range has been extending north and is now found north of San Francisco Bay.

== Description ==
This nudibranch grows to 50 mm, or a little more than 2 inches in length. The reddish or brownish line across its head is almost always present, and is very characteristic of the species.

This species can be confused with Hermissenda crassicornis, which is superficially similar in appearance.

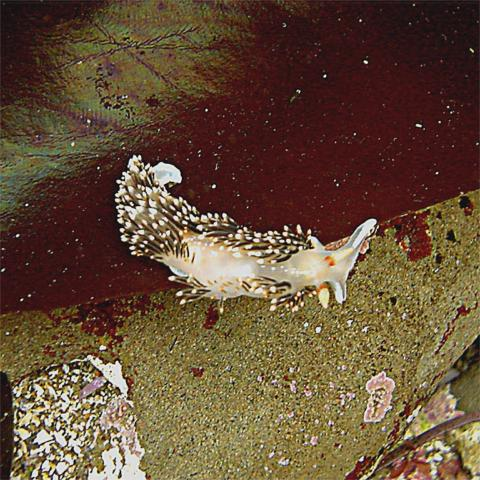
Phidiana hiltoni in a tide pool in California

== Life habits ==
This solid nudibranch species is considered to be rather aggressive, often biting and fighting with other nudibranchs, including members of its own species.
