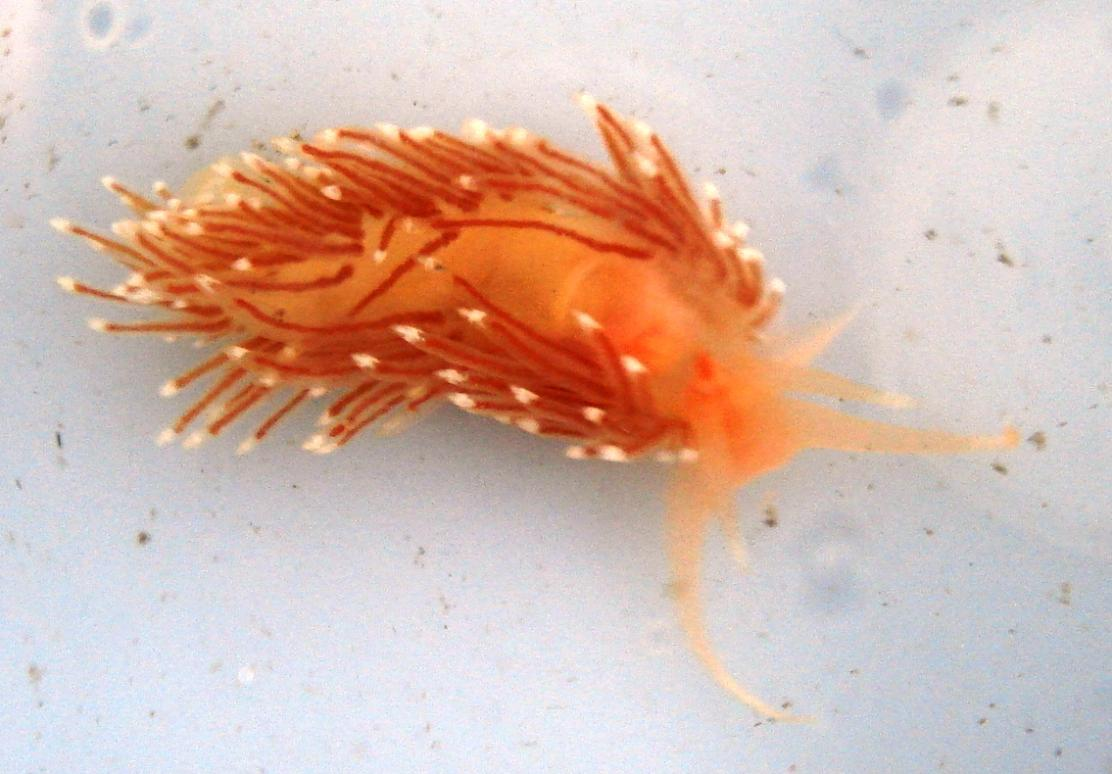

Scientific classification
- Kingdom: Animalia
- Phylum: Mollusca
- Class: Gastropoda
- Order: Nudibranchia
- Suborder: Aeolidacea
- Family: Facelinidae
- Genus: Facelina
- Species: F. bostoniensis

Binomial name
- Facelina bostoniensis (Couthouy, 1838)

Synonyms
- Coryphella bostoniensis Couthouy, 1838; Eolis bostoniensis Couthouy, 1838; Eolis curta Alder & Hancock, 1843; Eolis drummondi W. Thompson, 1844; Eolis tenuibranchialis Alder & Hancock, 1845

= Facelina bostoniensis =

Species of gastropod

Facelina bostoniensis is a species of sea slug, an aeolid nudibranch in the family Facelinidae.

== Distribution ==
This species was described from Massachusetts Bay. It is found on both sides of the North Atlantic ocean.

== Description ==
The body of Facelina bostoniensis is translucent white with a pink coloured hue around the mouth. The oesophagus, situated just behind the rhinophores, is clearly visible as a curved red tube. There are some patches of white pigment on the head, between the rhinophores and down the tail of the animal. Some individuals have blue iridescence in small areas around the head and rarely specimens with extensive blue colouration are found. The rhinophores are annulate, the oral tentacles are very long, both sets of tentacles are tipped with white pigment. Large individuals may grow to approximately 55 mm in length.

== Habitat ==
Commonly found in tidepools on the lower shore and amongst hydroids in fast-flowing water as well as in very sheltered muddy areas. Facelina bostoniensis feeds on a variety of hydroids and may attack and eat other aeolid nudibranchs.
