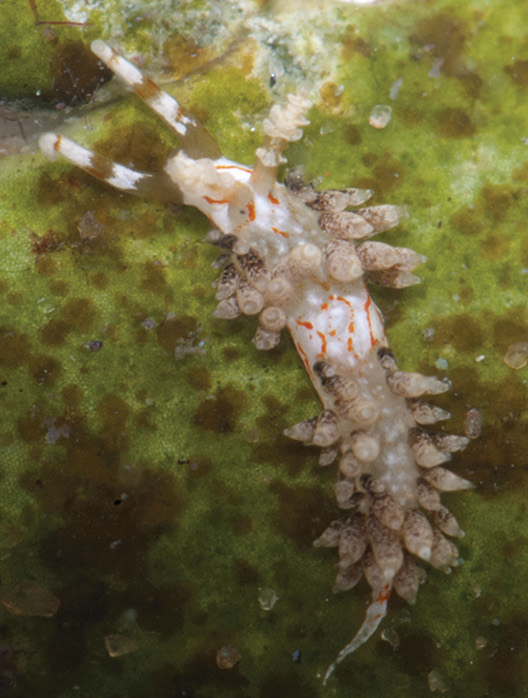

Scientific classification
- Kingdom: Animalia
- Phylum: Mollusca
- Class: Gastropoda
- Order: Nudibranchia
- Suborder: Aeolidacea
- Family: Facelinidae
- Genus: Facelina
- Species: F. bourailli

Binomial name
- Facelina bourailli (Risbec, 1928)

Synonyms
- Aeolidia bourailli Risbec, 1928; Phidiana bouraili [sic]; Phidiana bourailli (Risbec, 1928); Phidiana bourrailli [sic]

= Facelina bourailli =

Species of gastropod

Facelina bourailli is a species of sea slug, a nudibranch, a marine, gastropod mollusk in the family Facelinidae.

== Distribution ==
This species was described from New Caledonia. It has been reported from Tanzania, Australia, the Marshall Islands and the Mariana Islands.
