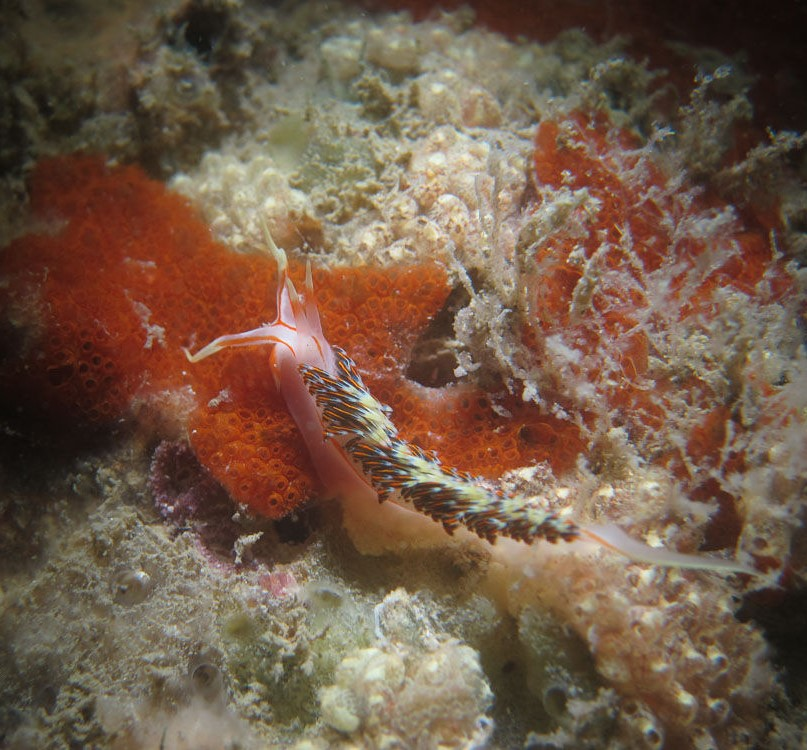
- Koh Phangan, Thailand

Scientific classification
- Kingdom: Animalia
- Phylum: Mollusca
- Class: Gastropoda
- Order: Nudibranchia
- Suborder: Aeolidacea
- Family: Facelinidae
- Genus: Caloria
- Species: C. militaris

Binomial name
- Caloria militaris (Alder & Hancock, 1864)

Synonyms
- Eolis militaris Alder & Hancock, 1864 (original combination); Phidiana militaris (Alder & Hancock, 1864)

= Caloria militaris =

Species of gastropod

Caloria militaris is a species of sea slug, an aeolid nudibranch, a marine gastropod mollusc in the family Facelinidae.

== Distribution ==
This species was described from India. It has been reported from Oman, New Zealand, Hong Kong, Thailand, Borneo and the Philippines. In 2016 three specimens of this species were observed eating hydroids on a sunken submarine in Haifa Bay off Israel, probably having reached the Mediterranean as a Lessepsian migrant through the Suez Canal from the Red Sea.
