= Facelina auriculata =

- A live individual of Facelina auriculata

Scientific classification
- Kingdom: Animalia
- Phylum: Mollusca
- Class: Gastropoda
- Order: Nudibranchia
- Suborder: Aeolidacea
- Family: Facelinidae
- Genus: Facelina
- Species: F. auriculata

Binomial name
- Facelina auriculata (Müller, 1776)

Synonyms
- Doris auriculata Müller, 1776(basionym); Doris longicornis Montagu, 1808; Eolidia coronata Forbes & Goodsir, 1839; Eolidia plumosa J. Fleming, 1828; Facelina auriculata coronata (Forbes & Goodsir, 1839); Facelina coronata (Forbes & Goodsir, 1839); Facelina plumosa (Fleming, 1828); Hervia modesta Bergh, 1871

Species of gastropod

Facelina auriculata, sometimes known by the common name Slim Aesop, is a species of sea slug, an aeolid nudibranch in the family Facelinidae.

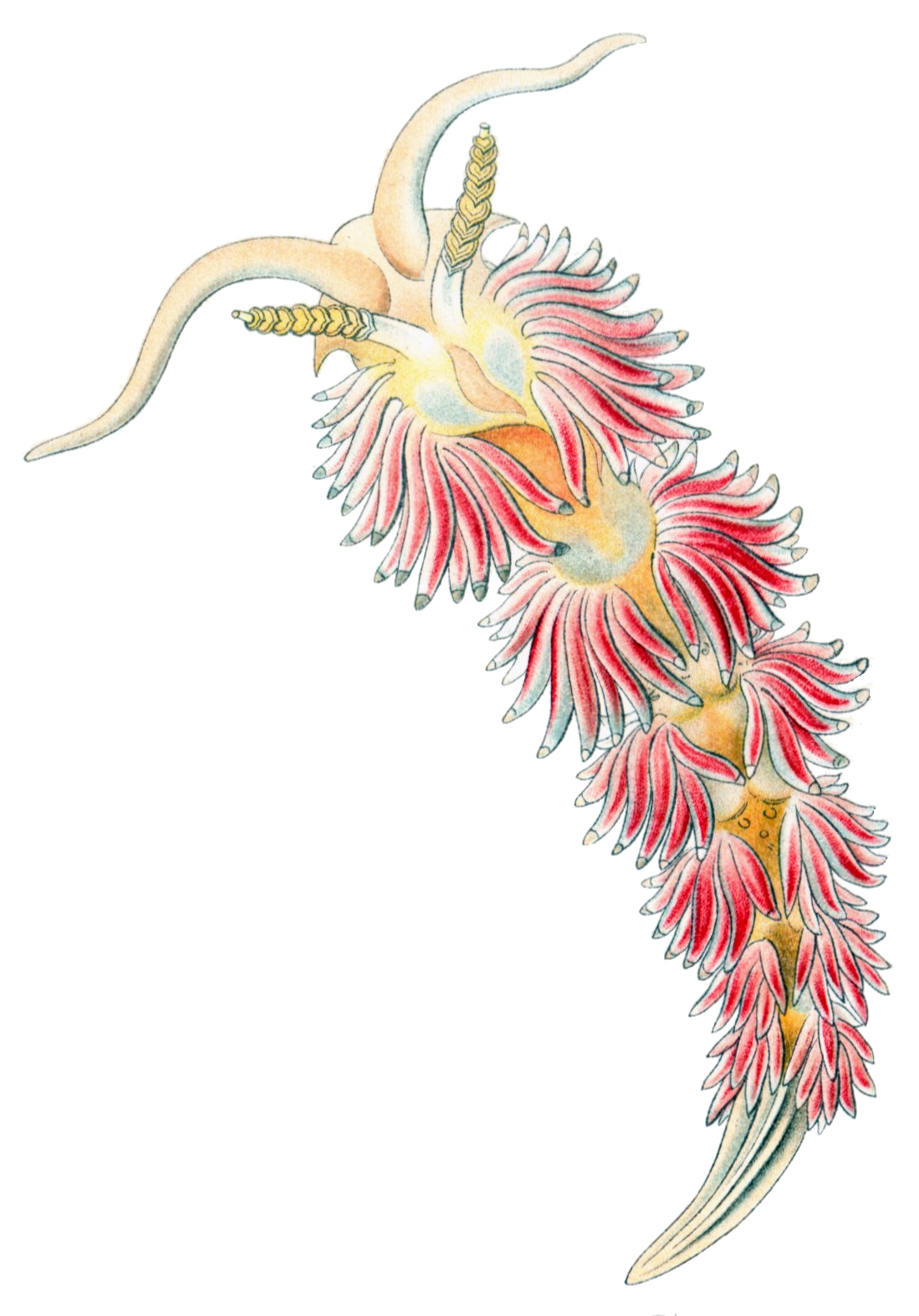
Drawing of Facelina auriculata from Kunstformen der Natur (1904)

Facelina coronata (Forbes & Goodsir, 1839) is a synonym of Facelina auriculata.

== Distribution ==
This species occurs in European waters.
