= Facelina hartleyi =

Scientific classification
- Kingdom: Animalia
- Phylum: Mollusca
- Class: Gastropoda
- Order: Nudibranchia
- Suborder: Aeolidacea
- Family: Facelinidae
- Genus: Facelina
- Species: F. hartleyi

Binomial name
- Facelina hartleyi Burn, 1962

Species of gastropod

Facelina hartleyi is a species of sea slug, an aeolid nudibranch, a marine gastropod mollusc in the family Facelinidae.

== Distribution ==
This species was described from Flinders, Victoria, Australia. It is endemic to southern Australia.
