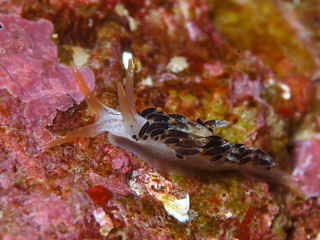

Scientific classification
- Kingdom: Animalia
- Phylum: Mollusca
- Class: Gastropoda
- Order: Nudibranchia
- Suborder: Aeolidacea
- Family: Facelinidae
- Genus: Facelina
- Species: F. bilineata

Binomial name
- Facelina bilineata Hirano & Ito, 1998

= Facelina bilineata =

Species of gastropod

Facelina bilineata is a species of sea slug, an aeolid nudibranch, a marine gastropod mollusc in the family Facelinidae.

== Distribution ==
This species has been reported from Japan.
