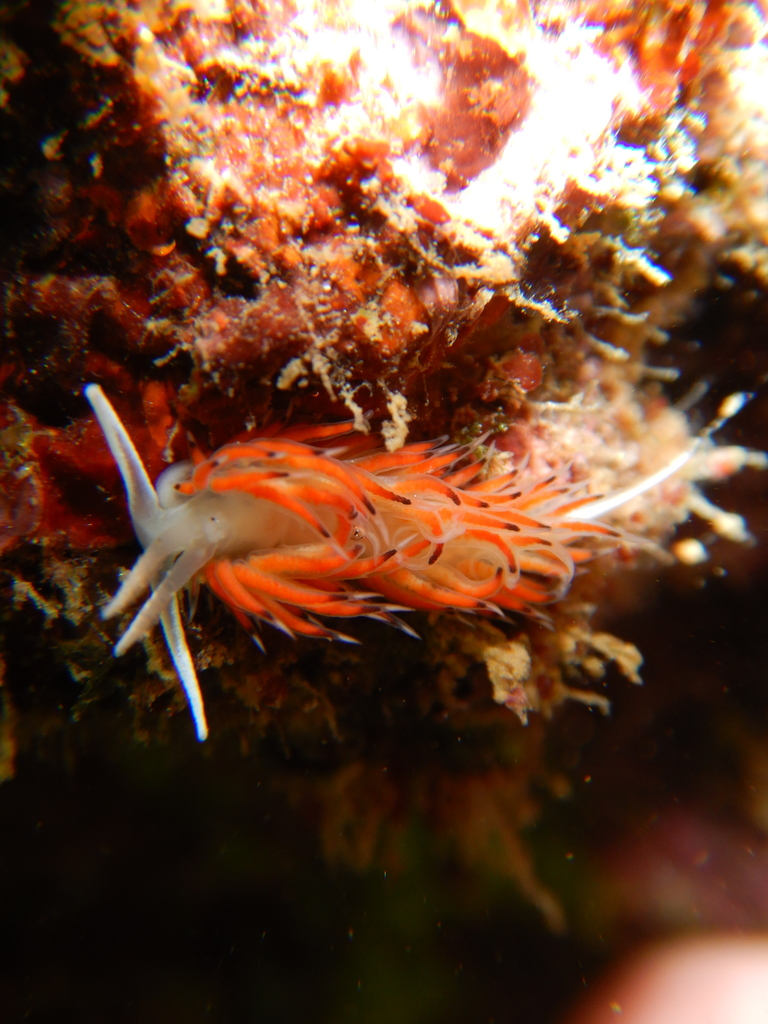

Scientific classification
- Kingdom: Animalia
- Phylum: Mollusca
- Class: Gastropoda
- Order: Nudibranchia
- Suborder: Aeolidacea
- Family: Facelinidae
- Genus: Caloria
- Species: C. quatrefagesi

Binomial name
- Caloria quatrefagesi (Vayssière, 1888)

Synonyms
- Acanthopsole quatrefagesi Vayssière, 1888

= Caloria quatrefagesi =

Species of gastropod

Caloria quatrefagesi is a species of sea slug, an aeolid nudibranch, a marine gastropod mollusc in the family Facelinidae.

== Taxonomy ==
Caloria elegans is morphologically very similar to Facelina quatrefagesi. Facelina quatrefagesi was considered as a synonym of Caloria elegans, but a combination of DNA evidence and morphological comparison resulted in them being recognised as separate valid species. The species was transferred to the genus Caloria in 2021.

== Distribution ==
This species was described from the Rade de Villefranche-sur-Mer, France.

== Description ==
The typical adult size of this species is 15 mm.
