= Pruvotfolia longicirrha =

Scientific classification
- Kingdom: Animalia
- Phylum: Mollusca
- Class: Gastropoda
- Order: Nudibranchia
- Suborder: Aeolidacea
- Family: Facelinidae
- Genus: Pruvotfolia
- Species: P. longicirrha

Binomial name
- Pruvotfolia longicirrha (Eliot, 1906)

Synonyms
- Phidiana longicirrha Eliot, 1906; Rolandia longicirrha (Eliot, 1906)

Species of gastropod

Pruvotfolia longicirrha is a species of sea slug, an aeolid nudibranch, and a marine gastropod mollusc in the family Facelinidae.

== Distribution ==
This species was described from the Cape Verde Islands.
