= William Macnae =

South African zoologist and malacologist

- Born: 1914; Scotland
- Died: 1975 (aged 60–61); South Africa
- Spouse: Marion Meason Macnae (née Walgate)
- Scientific career
- Fields: Zoology; Malacology
- Workplaces: Rhodes University; University of the Witwatersrand

William Macnae (1914–1975) was a South African zoologist and malacologist. He was a Scottish born-and-educated marine ecologist and moved to South Africa in 1948.

== Career ==
Macnae wrote the Crustacea section of the report entitled "Natural History of Canna and Sanday, Inner Hebrides: a report upon the Glasgow University Canna Expeditions, 1936 and 1937" published by the University of Glasgow in 1939 detailing the two visits by members of Glasgow University to Canna, Scotland, in June and July 1936 and 1937. In this report is the only British record of Chydorus gibbus (Lilljeborg), belonging to the sub-order Anomopoda.

In 1951 Macnae was appointed Lecturer in Zoology at Rhodes University in Grahamstown, South Africa under direction of Joseph Omer-Cooper and later Denis William (Jakes) Ewer. Under Omer-Cooper most research in the department of Zoology had been of an entomological nature, however Macnae was able to publish important descriptions of some South African opisthobranch gastropods. Macnae resigned in 1956 to move to the Zoology department of the University of the Witwatersrand.

The first comprehensive assessment of mangrove swamps in South Africa was conducted by Macnae in 1963. He personally conducted first hand observations of these mangrove ecosystems.

== Professional memberships ==
From 1950 Macnae was a member of the Malacological Society of London. The membership register from 1963 has the following entry:

- 1950 * Macnae, William, Ph.D., Dept. of Zoology, University of the Witwatersrand

== Personal life ==
Macnae married Marion Meason Walgate, who was lecturer in botany at the University of Cape Town and later an assistant at the Charles Moss Herbarium of the University of the Witwatersrand where William Macnae was a professor.

== Eponyms ==
Species named his honor include:

- Elysia macnaei Marcus, Ev., 1982 - a sacoglossan sea slug
- Symsagittifera macnaei (Marcus, Ev., 1957) - an acoel flatworm

The World Register of Marine Species (WoRMS) lists 24 marine species named by Macnae.

== Works ==
Papers and books published by MacNae include:

- Macnae, W. (1939). Crustacea. In: Bertram, D.S. (ed.). Natural History of Canna and Sanday, Inner Hebrides: a report upon the Glasgow University Canna Expeditions, 1936 and 1937. Proc. R. phys. Soc. Edinb. 23:65-66. (ii-1939)
- Macnae, W. (1950). An archiannelid from South Africa. Nature 166: 38.
- Macnae, W. (1953). On a small collection of amphipods from Tristan de Cunha. Proceedings of the Zoological Society of London, 122, 1025-1033.
- Macnae, W. (1954). On Some Eolidacean Nudibranchiate Mollusca from South Africa. Annals of the Natal Museum 13: 1-50
- Macnae, W. (1954). On four Sacoglossan Molluscs new to South Africa. Annals of the Natal Museum 13: 51-64, pl. III.
- Marcus, E.; Macnae, W. (1954). "Architomy in a Species of Convoluta". Nature. 173 (4394): 130. Bibcode:1954Natur.173..130M. doi:10.1038/173130a0. PMID 13132888.
- Macnae, W. (1955). On four species of the genus Aplysia common in South Africa. Annals of the Natal Museum 13 (2): 223-241.
- Macnae, W. (1956). Aspects of life on muddy shores in South Africa. South African Journal of Science 53: 40.
- Macnae, W. (1957). The ecology of the plants and animals in the intertidal region of the Zwartkops estuary near Port Elizabeth, South Africa, Part I. Journal of Ecology 45: 113-131.
- Macnae, W. (1957). The Families Polyceridae and Goniodorididae (Mollusca, Nudibranchiata) in Southern Africa. Transactions of the Royal Society of South Africa. 35(4): 341-372.
- Macnae, W. & M. Kalk (eds) (1958). A natural history of Inhaca Island, Mozambique. Witwatersrand Univ. Press, Johannesburg. I-iv, 163 pp.
- Macnae, W. (1962). The fauna and flora of the eastern coasts of southern Africa in relation to ocean currents. South African Journal of Science 58: 208-212.
- Macnae, W. (1962). "Tectibranch Molluscs from Southern Africa". Annals of the Natal Museum. 15 (16).
- Macnae, W. & M. Kalk (1962). The fauna and flora of sand flats at Inhaca Island, Moçambique. Journal of Animal Ecology 31: 93-128, 5 figs.
- Macnae, W. and Kalk, M. (1962). The ecology of the mangrove swamps at Inhaca Island, Mocambique. Journal of Ecology 50: 19-34.
- Macnae, W. (1963). Mangrove swamps in South Africa. Journal of Ecology 51: 1-25.
