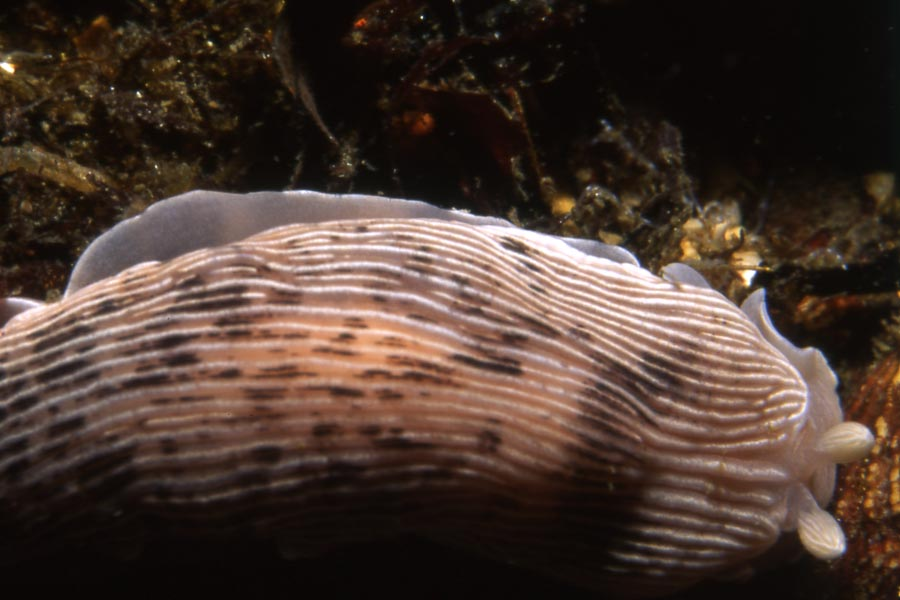
- Dermatobranchus sp. 4

Scientific classification
- Domain: Eukaryota
- Kingdom: Animalia
- Phylum: Mollusca
- Class: Gastropoda
- Order: Nudibranchia
- Suborder: Cladobranchia
- Family: Arminidae
- Genus: Dermatobranchus van Hasselt 1824

Type species
- Dermatobranchus striatus van Hasselt, 1824

Synonyms
- Dermatobranchopsis Baba, 1949; Dermatobranchus (Pleuroleura) Bergh, 1874; Pleuroleura Bergh, 1874

= Dermatobranchus =

Genus of gastropods

Dermatobranchus is a genus of sea slugs, or nudibranchs, marine gastropod molluscs in the family Arminidae.

== Biology ==
Dermatobranchus species feed on octocorals including sea fans and sea pens.

== Species ==
Species within the genus Dermatobranchus include:

- Dermatobranchus albineus Gosliner & Fahey, 2011
- Dermatobranchus albopunctulatus Baba, 1949
- Dermatobranchus albus (Eliot, 1904)
- Dermatobranchus arminus Gosliner & Fahey, 2011
- Dermatobranchus caeruleomaculatus Gosliner & Fahey, 2011
- Dermatobranchus caesitius Gosliner & Fahey, 2011
- Dermatobranchus cymatilis Gosliner & Fahey, 2011
- Dermatobranchus dendronephthyphagus Gosliner & Fahey, 2011
- Dermatobranchus diagonalis Gosliner & Fahey, 2011
- Dermatobranchus earlei Gosliner & Fahey, 2011
- Dermatobranchus fasciatus Gosliner & Fahey, 2011
- Dermatobranchus fortunatus (Bergh, 1888)
- Dermatobranchus funiculus Gosliner & Fahey, 2011
- Dermatobranchus glaber (Eliot, 1908)
- Dermatobranchus gonatophorus van Hasselt, 1824
- Dermatobranchus kalyptos Gosliner & Fahey, 2011
- Dermatobranchus kokonas Gosliner & Fahey, 2011
- Dermatobranchus leoni Gosliner & Fahey, 2011
- Dermatobranchus marginlatus Lin, 1981
- Dermatobranchus microphallus Gosliner & Fahey, 2011
- Dermatobranchus multidentatus Baba, 1949
- Dermatobranchus multistriatus Lin, 1981
- Dermatobranchus nigropunctatus Baba, 1949
- Dermatobranchus oculus Gosliner & Fahey, 2011
- Dermatobranchus ornatus (Bergh, 1874)
- Dermatobranchus otome Baba, 1992
- Dermatobranchus phyllodes Gosliner & Fahey, 2011
- Dermatobranchus piperoides Gosliner & Fahey, 2011
- Dermatobranchus primus Baba, 1976
- Dermatobranchus pustulosus van Hasselt, 1824
- Dermatobranchus rodmani Gosliner & Fahey, 2011
- Dermatobranchus sagamianus Baba, 1949
- Dermatobranchus semilunus Gosliner & Fahey, 2011
- Dermatobranchus semistriatus Baba, 1949
- Dermatobranchus sp. 1 white-ridged nudibranch
- Dermatobranchus sp. 4 brown ridged nudibranch
- Dermatobranchus striatellus Baba, 1949
- Dermatobranchus striatus van Hasselt, 1824
- Dermatobranchus substriatus Baba, 1949
- Dermatobranchus tongshanensis Lin, 1981
- Dermatobranchus tuberculatus Gosliner & Fahey, 2011

Species brought into synonymy

- Dermatobranchus (Pleuroleura) tongshanensis G.Y. Lin, 1981: synonym of Dermatobranchus tongshanensis G.Y. Lin, 1981
- Dermatobranchus pulcherrimus Miller & Willan, 1986: synonym of Dermatobranchus rubidus (Gould, 1852)
- Dermatobranchus rubidus (Gould, 1852); synonym of Armina rubida (A. Gould, 1852) (superseded combination)
- Dermatobranchus walteri (Krause, 1892): synonym of Doridoxa walteri (Krause, 1892)
