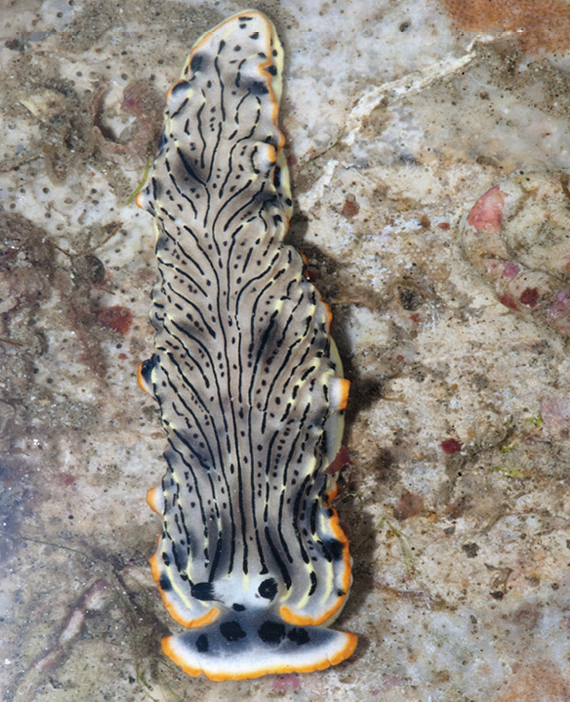
- Dermatobranchus gonatophorus

Scientific classification
- Domain: Eukaryota
- Kingdom: Animalia
- Phylum: Mollusca
- Class: Gastropoda
- Order: Nudibranchia
- Suborder: Cladobranchia
- Family: Arminidae
- Genus: Dermatobranchus
- Species: D. gonatophorus

Binomial name
- Dermatobranchus gonatophorus van Hasselt 1824

= Dermatobranchus gonatophorus =

Species of gastropod

Dermatobranchus gonatophorus is a species of sea slug, a nudibranch, a marine gastropod mollusc in the family Arminidae.

== Distribution ==
This species occurs in the Indo-Pacific region. It has been reported from South Africa, Thailand, Malaysia and Indonesia.
