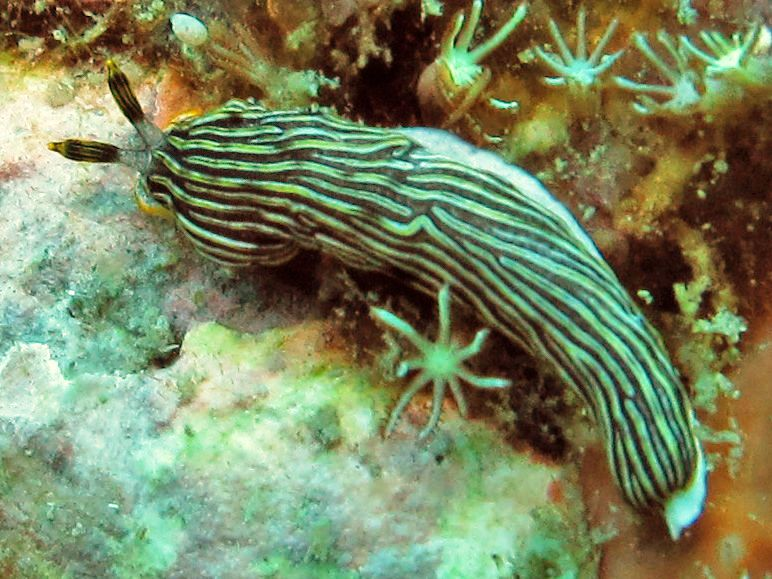

Scientific classification
- Domain: Eukaryota
- Kingdom: Animalia
- Phylum: Mollusca
- Class: Gastropoda
- Order: Nudibranchia
- Suborder: Cladobranchia
- Family: Arminidae
- Genus: Dermatobranchus
- Species: D. striatus

Binomial name
- Dermatobranchus striatus van Hasselt 1824

= Dermatobranchus striatus =

Species of gastropod

Dermatobranchus striatus is a species of sea slug, a nudibranch, a marine gastropod mollusc in the family Arminidae.

== Distribution ==
This species occurs in the Indo-Pacific region.
