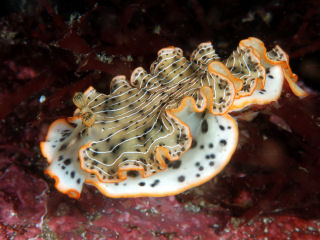

Scientific classification
- Kingdom: Animalia
- Phylum: Mollusca
- Class: Gastropoda
- Order: Nudibranchia
- Suborder: Cladobranchia
- Family: Arminidae
- Genus: Dermatobranchus
- Species: D. nigropunctatus

Binomial name
- Dermatobranchus nigropunctatus Baba, 1949

= Dermatobranchus nigropunctatus =

Species of gastropod

Dermatobranchus nigropunctatus is a species of sea slug, a nudibranch, a marine gastropod mollusc in the family Arminidae.

== Distribution ==
This species occurs in the Indo-Pacific region. It was described from Japan. It has been reported from Eastern Australia. but this record refers to Dermatobranchus dendronephthyphagus.
