= Dermatobranchus multidentatus =

Scientific classification
- Kingdom: Animalia
- Phylum: Mollusca
- Class: Gastropoda
- Order: Nudibranchia
- Suborder: Cladobranchia
- Family: Arminidae
- Genus: Dermatobranchus
- Species: D. multidentatus

Binomial name
- Dermatobranchus multidentatus Baba, 1949

Species of gastropod

Dermatobranchus multidentatus is a species of sea slug, a nudibranch, a marine gastropod mollusc in the family Arminidae. This species was described from Japan.
