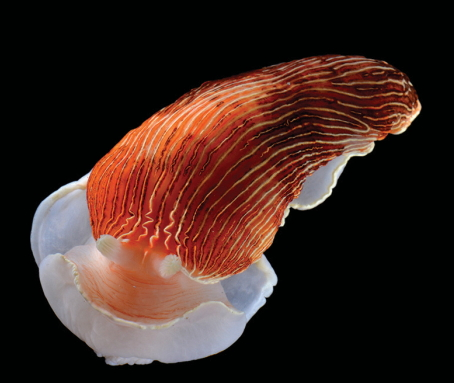

Scientific classification
- Kingdom: Animalia
- Phylum: Mollusca
- Class: Gastropoda
- Order: Nudibranchia
- Suborder: Cladobranchia
- Family: Arminidae
- Genus: Dermatobranchus
- Species: D. arminus

Binomial name
- Dermatobranchus arminus Gosliner & Fahey, 2011

= Dermatobranchus arminus =

Species of gastropod

Dermatobranchus arminus is a species of sea slug, a nudibranch, a marine gastropod mollusc in the family Arminidae.

== Description ==
Thie size of this marine species attains 20 mm.

This species is small-bodied, with opaque white ridges along the body marked by dark brown blotches. The body is pale with faint brown saddle-like markings. The rhinophores (chemosensory tentacles) are small, oval, and have longitudinal ridges.

Color: Pale-bodied, indistinctly brown saddled nudibranch with raised opaque white longitudinal ridges having dark blotches along them.

== Distribution ==
This species was described from Bakoven on the Atlantic Coast of Western Cape Province, South Africa, usually deeper than 20 m.
