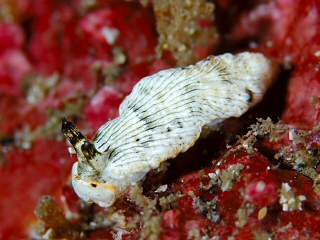

Scientific classification
- Kingdom: Animalia
- Phylum: Mollusca
- Class: Gastropoda
- Order: Nudibranchia
- Suborder: Cladobranchia
- Family: Arminidae
- Genus: Dermatobranchus
- Species: D. semistriatus

Binomial name
- Dermatobranchus semistriatus Baba, 1949

= Dermatobranchus semistriatus =

Species of gastropod

Dermatobranchus semistriatus is a species of sea slug, a nudibranch, a marine gastropod mollusc belonging to the family Arminidae.

== Distribution ==
This species occurs in the Indo-Pacific region.
