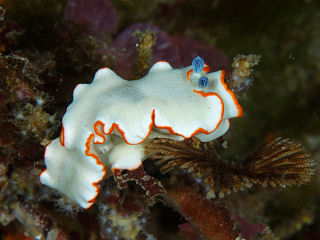

Scientific classification
- Kingdom: Animalia
- Phylum: Mollusca
- Class: Gastropoda
- Order: Nudibranchia
- Suborder: Cladobranchia
- Family: Arminidae
- Genus: Dermatobranchus
- Species: D. albopunctulatus

Binomial name
- Dermatobranchus albopunctulatus Baba, 1949

= Dermatobranchus albopunctulatus =

Species of gastropod

Dermatobranchus albopunctulatus is a species of sea slug, a nudibranch, a marine gastropod mollusc in the family Arminidae.

== Distribution ==
This species was described from Sagami Bay, Japan. It is endemic to Japan.
