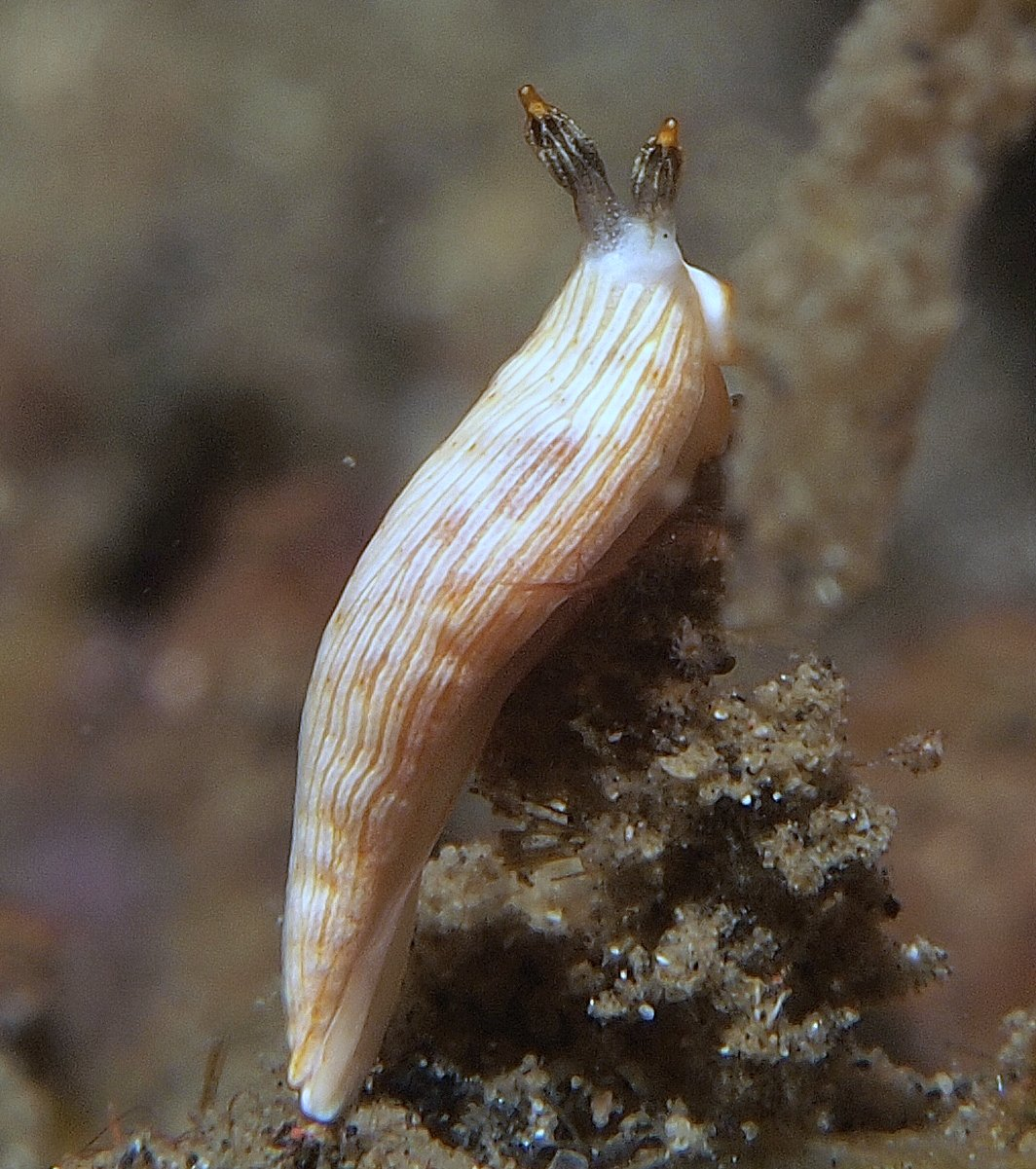

Scientific classification
- Kingdom: Animalia
- Phylum: Mollusca
- Class: Gastropoda
- Order: Nudibranchia
- Suborder: Cladobranchia
- Family: Arminidae
- Genus: Dermatobranchus
- Species: D. albus

Binomial name
- Dermatobranchus albus Eliot, 1904

Synonyms
- Pleuroleura alba

= Dermatobranchus albus =

Species of gastropod

Dermatobranchus albus is a species of sea slug, a nudibranch, a marine gastropod mollusc in the family Arminidae.

== Distribution ==
This species was described from the Indian Ocean coast of Africa. It has been reported from Indonesia and other locations in the Indo-Pacific region.
