= Dermatobranchus marginlatus =

Scientific classification
- Domain: Eukaryota
- Kingdom: Animalia
- Phylum: Mollusca
- Class: Gastropoda
- Order: Nudibranchia
- Suborder: Cladobranchia
- Family: Arminidae
- Genus: Dermatobranchus
- Species: D. marginlatus

Binomial name
- Dermatobranchus marginlatus Lin, 1981

Species of gastropod

Dermatobranchus marginlatus is a species of sea slug, a nudibranch, a marine gastropod mollusc in the family Arminidae.

== Distribution ==
This species occurs in the Indo-Pacific region.
