= Dermatobranchus cymatilis =

Scientific classification
- Kingdom: Animalia
- Phylum: Mollusca
- Class: Gastropoda
- Order: Nudibranchia
- Suborder: Arminacea
- Family: Arminidae
- Genus: Dermatobranchus
- Species: D. cymatilis

Binomial name
- Dermatobranchus cymatilis Gosliner & Fahey, 2011

Species of mollusc

Dermatobranchus cymatilis is a species of sea slug, a nudibranch, a marine gastropod mollusc in the family Arminidae.

== Distribution ==
This species was described from Okinawa, Japan. It has been reported from the Philippines.
