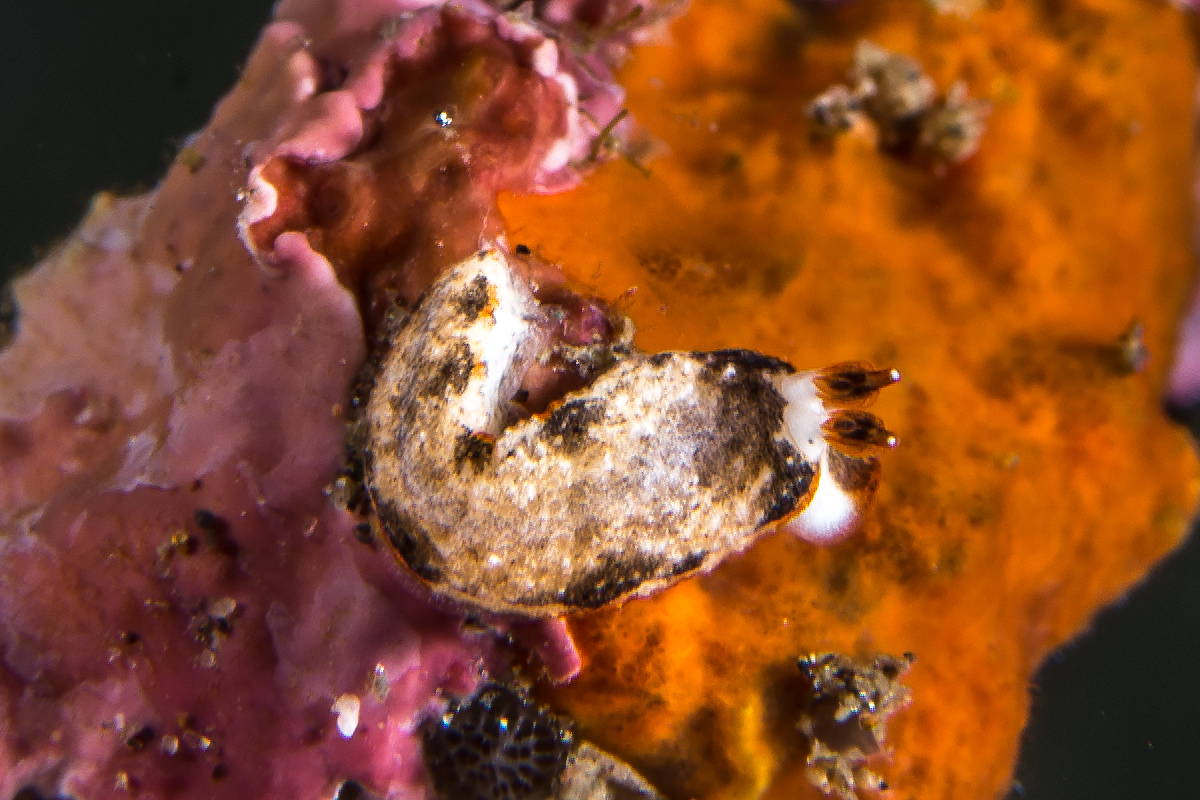
- The nudibranch Dermatobranchus fortunatus, Lipah Bay, Amed, Bali.

Scientific classification
- Kingdom: Animalia
- Phylum: Mollusca
- Class: Gastropoda
- Order: Nudibranchia
- Suborder: Cladobranchia
- Family: Arminidae
- Genus: Dermatobranchus
- Species: D. fortunatus

Binomial name
- Dermatobranchus fortunatus Bergh, 1888

= Dermatobranchus fortunatus =

Species of gastropod

Dermatobranchus fortunatus is a species of sea slug, a nudibranch, a marine gastropod mollusc in the family Arminidae.

== Distribution ==
This species occurs in the Indo-Pacific region. It was described from Java, Indonesia. It has been reported from the Great Barrier Reef, Australia, Okinawa, Japan, the Seychelles, Marshall Islands, Indonesia, Papua New Guinea, eastern Malaysia, and the Philippines.
