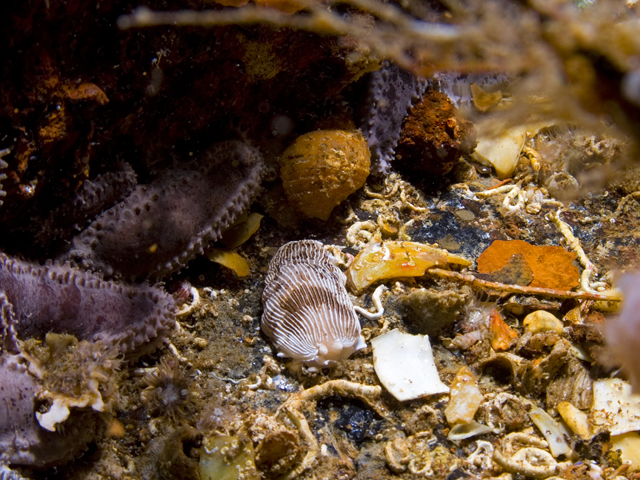

Scientific classification
- Kingdom: Animalia
- Phylum: Mollusca
- Class: Gastropoda
- Order: Nudibranchia
- Suborder: Cladobranchia
- Family: Arminidae
- Genus: Dermatobranchus
- Species: D. sp. 4

Binomial name
- Dermatobranchus sp. 4

= Brown ridged nudibranch =

Species of gastropod

The brown ridged nudibranch, Dermatobranchus sp. 4, as designated by Gosliner, 1987, is a species of nudibranch. It is a marine gastropod mollusc in the family Arminidae. As at November 2009, it remained undescribed by science.

== Distribution ==
This species has to date only been found off South Africa, on both coasts of the Cape Peninsula, in 10–30 m of water. It appears to be endemic.

== Description ==
The brown ridged nudibranch is a small nudibranch, reaching 25 mm in total length. It is pale-bodied with narrow white ridges running longitudinally down its body. Variable brown blotches run across its body with a distinct brown collar at the head area. Its pale rhinophores are oval with longitudinal ridges.
