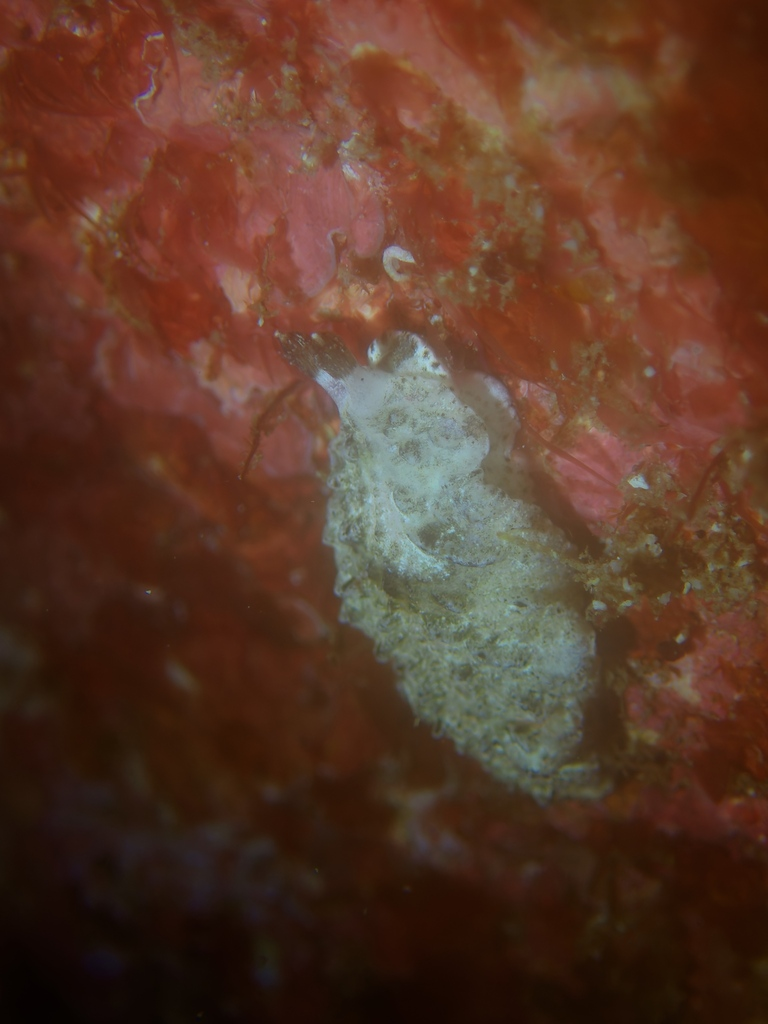

Scientific classification
- Kingdom: Animalia
- Phylum: Mollusca
- Class: Gastropoda
- Order: Nudibranchia
- Suborder: Cladobranchia
- Family: Arminidae
- Genus: Dermatobranchus
- Species: D. kalyptos

Binomial name
- Dermatobranchus kalyptos Gosliner & Fahey, 2011

= Dermatobranchus kalyptos =

Species of gastropod

Dermatobranchus kalyptos is a species of sea slug, a nudibranch, a marine gastropod mollusc in the family Arminidae.

== Distribution ==
This species occurs in the Indo-Pacific region.
