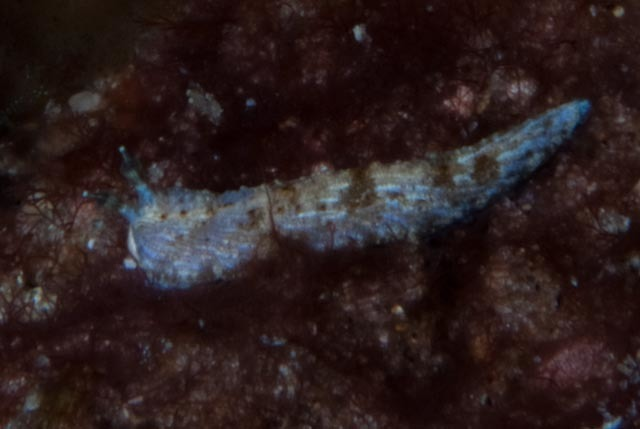

Scientific classification
- Kingdom: Animalia
- Phylum: Mollusca
- Class: Gastropoda
- Order: Nudibranchia
- Suborder: Cladobranchia
- Family: Arminidae
- Genus: Dermatobranchus
- Species: D. caesitius

Binomial name
- Dermatobranchus caesitius Gosliner & Fahey, 2011

= Dermatobranchus caesitius =

Species of gastropod

Dermatobranchus caesitius is a species of sea slug, a nudibranch, a marine gastropod mollusc in the family Arminidae.

== Distribution ==
This species was described from Umgazana on the Indian Ocean coast of South Africa, 31.695°S 29.424°E.
