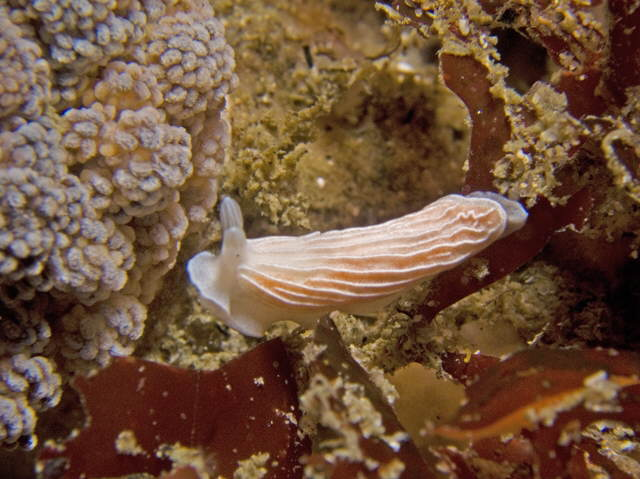
- Llandudno, South Africa

Scientific classification
- Domain: Eukaryota
- Kingdom: Animalia
- Phylum: Mollusca
- Class: Gastropoda
- Order: Nudibranchia
- Suborder: Cladobranchia
- Family: Arminidae
- Genus: Dermatobranchus
- Species: D. albineus

Binomial name
- Dermatobranchus albineus Gosliner & Fahey, 2011

= Dermatobranchus albineus =

Nudibranch in the family Arminidae

Dermatobranchus albineus, common name the white-ridged nudibranch, is a species of sea slug, a nudibranch, a marine gastropod mollusc in the family Arminidae.

== Description ==
This species is small in size (up to 20 mm), with opaque white ridges along the body. The rhinophores (chemosensory tentacles) are small, oval-shaped, and feature longitudinal ridges. This is a pale-bodied nudibranch featuring raised, opaque white longitudinal ridges.

== Distribution ==
This species was described from Hottentots Huisie (Oudekraal), Atlantic coast, Cape Peninsula, Cape Province, South Africa 33°59.2407′S 18°20.81224′E at 7 m depth. Multiple specimens from this locality and east as far as Algoa Bay, Port Elizabeth were included in the original description.
