= Dermatobranchus glaber =

Scientific classification
- Kingdom: Animalia
- Phylum: Mollusca
- Class: Gastropoda
- Order: Nudibranchia
- Suborder: Cladobranchia
- Family: Arminidae
- Genus: Dermatobranchus
- Species: D. glaber

Binomial name
- Dermatobranchus glaber Eliot, 1904

Synonyms
- Pleuroleura glabra

Species of gastropod

Dermatobranchus glaber is a species of sea slug, a nudibranch, a marine gastropod mollusc in the family Arminidae.

== Distribution ==
This species was described from the Red Sea, Africa.
