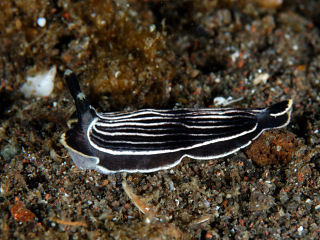

Scientific classification
- Kingdom: Animalia
- Phylum: Mollusca
- Class: Gastropoda
- Order: Nudibranchia
- Suborder: Cladobranchia
- Family: Arminidae
- Genus: Armina
- Species: A. magna

Binomial name
- Armina magna Baba, 1955

= Armina magna =

Species of gastropod

Armina magna is a species of sea slug, a nudibranch, a marine gastropod mollusk in the family Arminidae.
