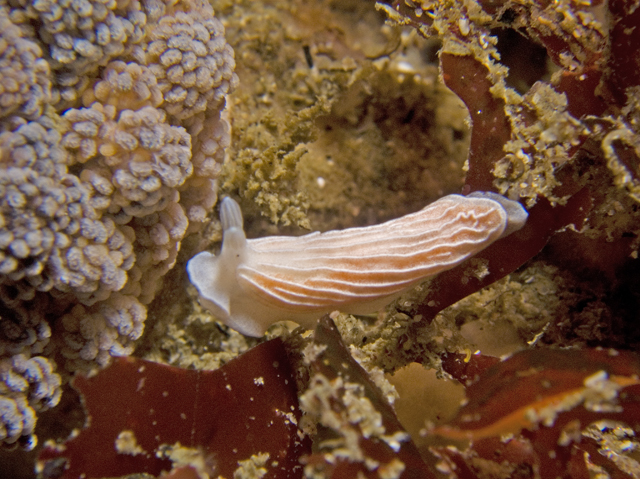

Scientific classification
- Kingdom: Animalia
- Phylum: Mollusca
- Class: Gastropoda
- Order: Nudibranchia
- Suborder: Cladobranchia
- Family: Arminidae
- Genus: Dermatobranchus
- Species: D. sp. 1

Binomial name
- Dermatobranchus sp. 1

= White-ridged nudibranch =

Species of gastropod

The white-ridged nudibranch, Dermatobranchus sp. 1, as designated by Gosliner, 1987, is a species of nudibranch. It is a marine gastropod mollusc in the family Arminidae. As at November 2009, it remained undescribed by science.

== Distribution ==
This species has to date only been found off South Africa, from the Atlantic coast of the Cape Peninsula to Port Elizabeth, in 10–15 m of water. It appears to be endemic.

== Description ==
The white-ridged nudibranch is a small nudibranch, reaching 20 mm in total length. It is pale-bodied with opaque white ridges running down the length of the body. Its rhinophores are set close together on its head and are oval with longitudinal ridges.

== Ecology ==
The white-ridged nudibranch feeds on soft corals.
