= Lobiger sagamiensis =

Scientific classification
- Kingdom: Animalia
- Phylum: Mollusca
- Class: Gastropoda
- Family: Oxynoidae
- Genus: Lobiger
- Species: L. sagamiensis

Binomial name
- Lobiger sagamiensis Baba, 1952

Species of gastropod

Lobiger sagamiensis is a species of small sea snail, a marine gastropod mollusk in the family Oxynoidae.

The type locality for this species is Sagami Bay, Japan.
