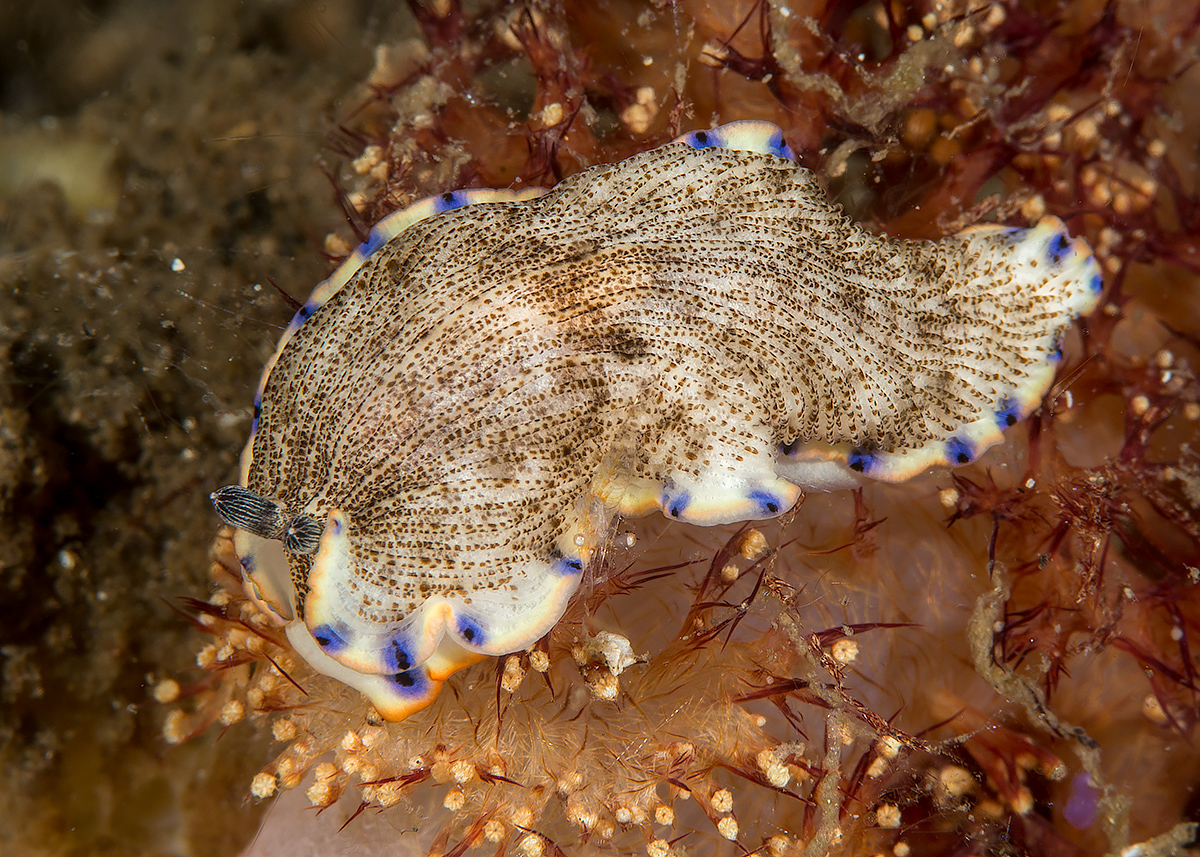
- Dermatobranchus caeruleomaculatus in Bima, Sumbawa, Indonesia.

Scientific classification
- Kingdom: Animalia
- Phylum: Mollusca
- Class: Gastropoda
- Order: Nudibranchia
- Suborder: Arminacea
- Family: Arminidae
- Genus: Dermatobranchus
- Species: D. caeruleomaculatus

Binomial name
- Dermatobranchus caeruleomaculatus Gosliner & Fahey, 2011

= Dermatobranchus caeruleomaculatus =

Species of gastropod

Dermatobranchus caeruleomaculatus is a species of nudibranch in the family Arminidae.

== Distribution ==
This species occurs in the Indo-Pacific region. It was described from Waterfall Bay, south side Tioman Island, east Malaysia. It is also known from Indonesia, the Philippines and Papua New Guinea.
