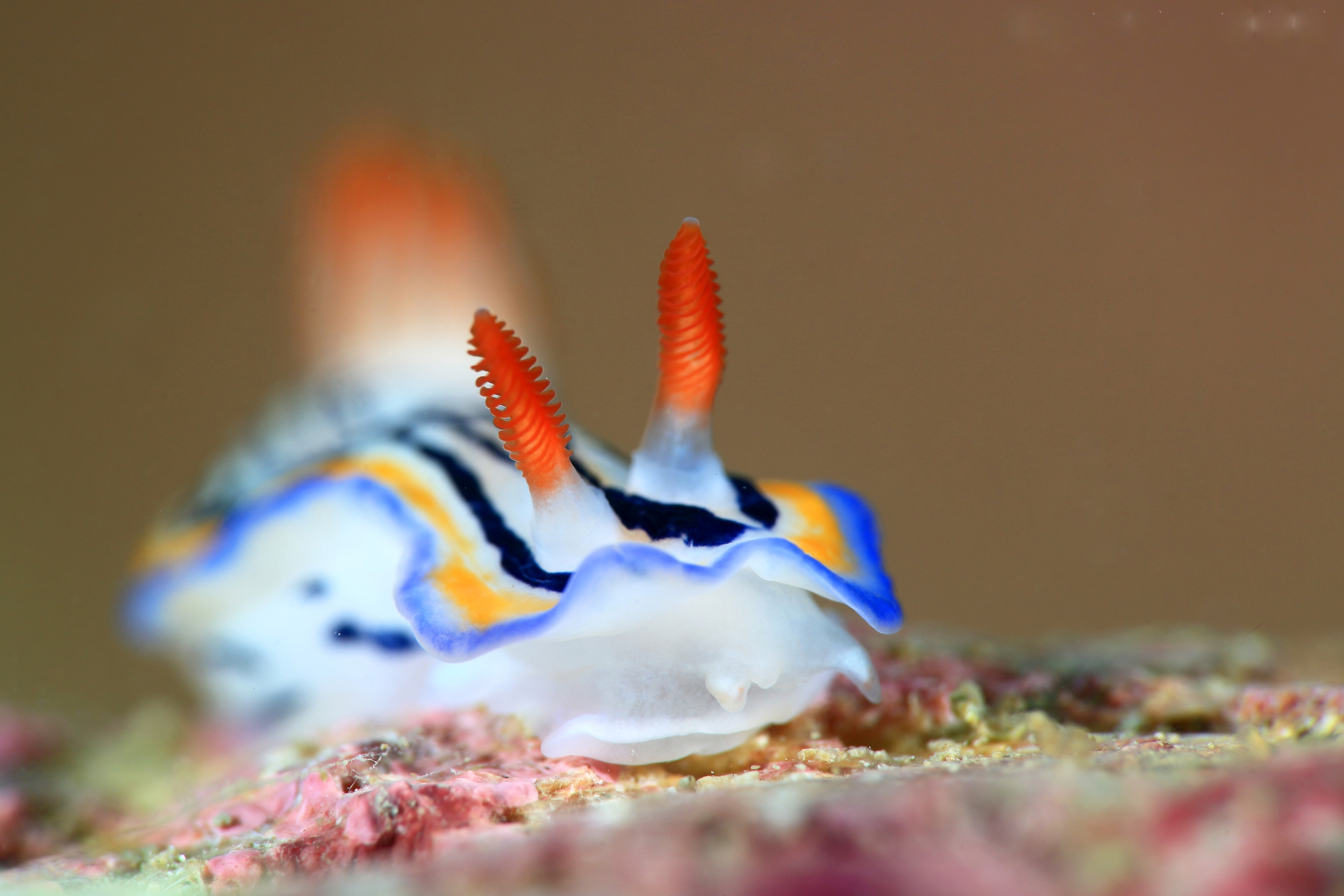
- Leung Shuen Wan, Sai Kung, Hong Kong

Scientific classification
- Kingdom: Animalia
- Phylum: Mollusca
- Class: Gastropoda
- Order: Nudibranchia
- Family: Chromodorididae
- Genus: Hypselodoris
- Species: H. maritima

Binomial name
- Hypselodoris maritima (Baba, 1949)

= Hypselodoris maritima =

Species of gastropod

Hypselodoris maritima is a species of colourful sea slug or dorid nudibranch, a marine gastropod mollusk in the family Chromodorididae.

== Distribution ==
This nudibranch is found in the Western Pacific Ocean from New Caledonia to Japan.

== Description ==
Hypselodoris maritima has a white body with a yellow and blue mantle edge and foot. There are black striated lines present on the upper dorsum. The gills and rhinophores are white, lined with orange. This species can reach a total length of at least 20 mm. It is similar in appearance to Hypselodoris nigrolineata.
