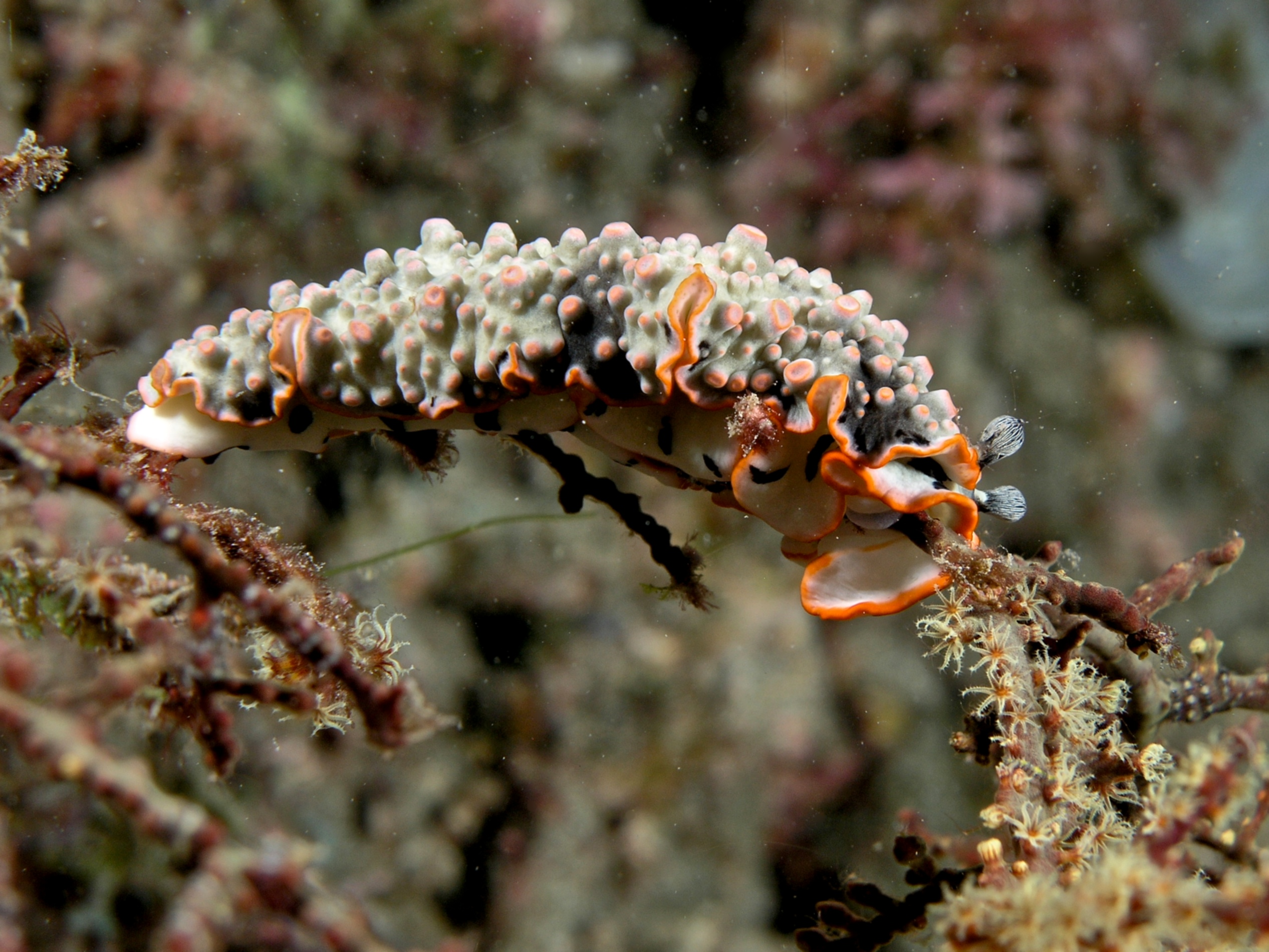

Scientific classification
- Kingdom: Animalia
- Phylum: Mollusca
- Class: Gastropoda
- Order: Nudibranchia
- Suborder: Cladobranchia
- Family: Arminidae
- Genus: Dermatobranchus
- Species: D. ornatus

Binomial name
- Dermatobranchus ornatus Bergh, 1888

= Dermatobranchus ornatus =

Species of gastropod

Dermatobranchus ornatus is a species of sea slug, a nudibranch, a marine gastropod mollusc in the family Arminidae.

== Distribution ==
This species occurs in the Indo-Pacific region. It was described from the Philippines. It has been reported from Oman, Japan, Taiwan, Thailand, Malaysia, the Philippine Islands, Indonesia, and Australia.
