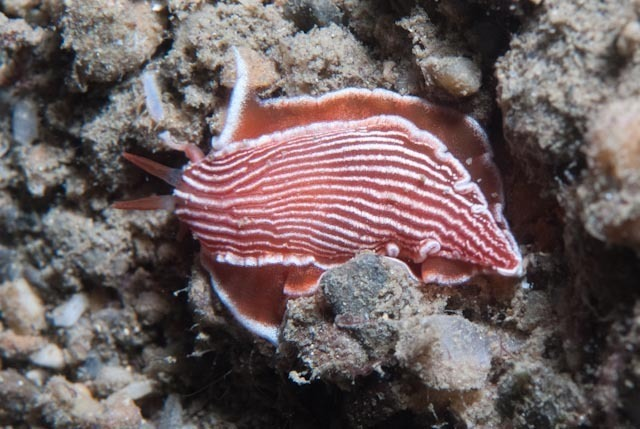

Scientific classification
- Kingdom: Animalia
- Phylum: Mollusca
- Class: Gastropoda
- Order: Nudibranchia
- Suborder: Cladobranchia
- Family: Arminidae
- Genus: Armina
- Species: A. rubida

Binomial name
- Armina rubida (Gould, 1852)

Synonyms
- Dermatobranchus pulcherrimus M. C. Miller & Willan, 1986 (junior subjective synonym); Dermatobranchus rubidus (A. Gould, 1852) superseded combination; Diphyllidia rubida A. Gould, 1852 superseded combinatio

= Armina rubida =

Species of gastropod

Armina rubida is a species of sea slug, a nudibranch, a marine gastropod mollusc in the family Arminidae.

== Distribution ==
This species occurs in the Indo-Pacific region. It was described from Hawaii. It has subsequently been reported from New Zealand where it was described as Dermatobranchus pulcherrimus Miller & Willan, 1986.
