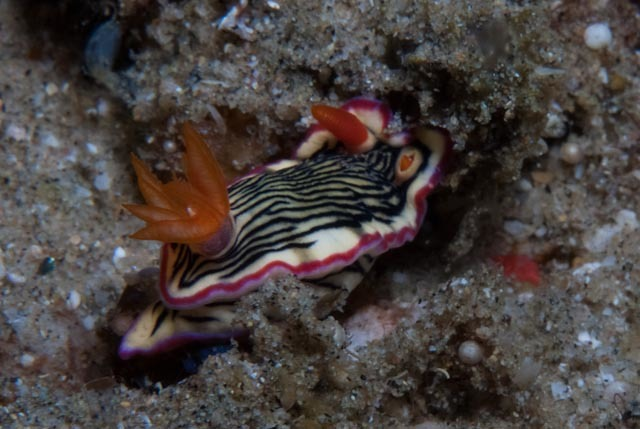

Scientific classification
- Kingdom: Animalia
- Phylum: Mollusca
- Class: Gastropoda
- Order: Nudibranchia
- Family: Chromodorididae
- Genus: Hypselodoris
- Species: H. nigrolineata

Binomial name
- Hypselodoris nigrolineata (Eliot, 1904)

Synonyms
- Chromodoris nigrolineata Eliot, 1904 (basionym)

= Hypselodoris nigrolineata =

Species of gastropod

Hypselodoris nigrolineata is a species of colourful sea slug or dorid nudibranch, a marine gastropod mollusk in the family Chromodorididae.

== Distribution ==
This nudibranch is found in the Indian Ocean off Kenya and Tanzania.

== Description ==
Hypselodoris nigrolineata has a white-cream body and a bright purple mantle edge and foot. There are often black striated lines running longitudinally along its dorsum. The gills and rhinophores are orange. This species can reach a total length of at least 35 mm. It is similar in appearance to Hypselodoris maritima.
