= Kikutaro Baba =

Japanese marine biologist

Kikutaro Baba (馬場 菊太郎, Baba Kikutarō; 11 July 1905 in Fukuoka Prefecture, Kyūshū, Japan – 30 November 2001 in Japan) was a Japanese malacologist. He was the leading researcher on sea slugs and bubble snails, opisthobranch gastropod mollusks in Japan.

== Biography ==
- 1932–1941 Kyushu University
- 1948–1949 Osaka Kyoiku University
- 1976 – Order of the Rising Sun

Kikutaro Baba was married to Sonoko Baba. He died of pneumonia in hospital in Japan on 30 November 2001.

== Species ==
Species described by Kikutaro Baba include:

- Aglaja orientalis Baba, 1949
- Aldisa cooperi Robilliard & Baba, 1972
- Antonietta janthina Baba & Hamatani, 1977
- Aplysia kurodai Baba, 1937
- Aplysia sagamiana Baba, 1949
- Aplysiopsis minor (Baba, 1959)
- Aplysiopsis nigra (Baba, 1949)
- Aplysiopsis orientalis Baba, 1949
- Armina magna Baba, 1955
- Bornella japonica Baba, 1949
- Cadlina japonica Baba, 1937
- Cadlina sagamiensis Baba, 1937
- Carminodoris bifurcata Baba, 1993
- Chelidonura fulvipunctata Baba, 1938
- Ceratosoma bicolor Baba, 1949
- Cerberilla asamusiensis Baba, 1940
- Chelidonura fulvipunctata Baba, 1938
- Chelidonura inornata Baba, 1949
- Chelidonura tsurugensis Baba & Abe, 1959
- Cratena affinis (Baba, 1949)
- Crimora lutea Baba, 1949
- Cuthona alpha Baba & Hamatani, 1963
- Cuthona anulata (Baba, 1949)
- Cuthona beta (Baba & Abe, 1964)
- Cuthona diversicolor (Baba, 1975)
- Cuthona ornata Baba, 1937
- Cuthona purpureoanulata (Baba, 1961)
- Dendrodoris elongata Baba, 1936
- Dermatobranchus albopunctulatus Baba, 1976
- Dermatobranchus nigropunctatus Baba, 1949
- Dermatobranchus otome Baba, 1992
- Dermatobranchus primus Baba, 1976
- Dermatobranchus semistriatus Baba, 1949
- Dermatobranchus striatellus Baba, 1949
- Elysia abei Baba, 1955
- Elysia amakusana Baba, 1955
- Elysia kushimotoensis Baba, 1938
- Elysia obtusa Baba, 1938
- Elysia trisinuata Baba, 1949
- Ercolania boodleae (Baba, 1938)
- Ercolania subviridis (Baba, 1959)
- Eubranchopsis virginalis Baba, 1949
- Eubranchus horii Baba, 1960
- Eubranchus inabai Baba, 1964
- Eubranchus misakiensis Baba, 1960
- Euphurus ornatus Baba, 1937
- Facelina quadrilineata (Baba, 1930)
- Favorinus japonicus Baba, 1949
- Favorinus mirabilis Baba, 1955
- Favorinus perfoliatus Baba, 1949
- Favorinus tsuruganus Baba & Abe, 19
- Glossodoris misakinosibogae Baba, 1988
- Goniodoris felis Baba, 1949
- Gymnodoris amakusana (Baba, 1996)
- Gymnodoris nigricolor Baba, 1960
- Gymnodoris okinawae Baba, 1936
- Gymnodoris subflava Baba, 1949
- Halgerda rubicunda Baba, 1949
- Hermaea zosterae (Baba, 1959)
- Hermaeina nigra Baba, 1949
- Hermissenda emurai (Baba, 1937)
- Herviella albida Baba, 1966
- Herviella yatsui (Baba, 1930)
- Hopkinsia hiroi (Baba, 1938)
- Hopkinsia plana (Baba, 1960)
- Hypselodoris kaname Baba, 1994
- Hypselodoris maritima (Baba, 1949)
- Hypselodoris placida (Baba, 1949)
- Hypselodoris sagamiensis (Baba, 1949)
- Hypselodoris shimodaensis Baba, 1994
- Janolus mirabilis Baba & Abe, 1970
- Janolus toyamensis Baba & Abe, 1970
- Jorunna parva (Baba, 1938)
- Kaloplocamus acutus Baba, 1949
- Lobiger sagamiensis Baba, 1952
- Madrella gloriosa Baba, 1949
- Madrella granlaris Baba, 1949
- Metaruncina setoensis (Baba, 1954)
- Mexichromis multituberculata (Baba, 1953)
- Noumea nivalis Baba, 1937
- Noumea purpurea Baba, 1949
- Noumea subnivalis Baba, 1987
- Okenia barnardi Baba, 1937
- Okenia distincta Baba, 1940
- Okenia echinata Baba, 1949
- Okenia japonica Baba, 1949
- Okenia plana Baba, 1960
- Petalifera ramosa Baba, 1959
- Phidiana anulifera (Baba, 1949)
- Phyllidia japonica Baba, 1937
- Phyllidia zebrina Baba, 1976
- Phyllodesmium iriomotense Baba, 1991
- Phyllodesmium kabiranum Baba, 1991
- Phyllodesmium serratum (Baba, 1949)
- Pleurobranchus hirasei Baba, 1971
- Polycera fujitai Baba, 1937
- Polycera japonica Baba, 1949
- Protaeolidiella atra Baba, 1955
- Roboastra luteolineata (Baba, 1936)
- Rostanga risbeci Baba, 1991
- Sagaminopteron ornatum Tokioka & Baba, 1964
- Sakuraeolis enosimensis (Baba, 1930)
- Sakuraeolis sp. Baba, 1965 In: Baba & Hamatani, 1965
- Siphopteron flavum (Tokioka & Baba, 1964)
- Siphopteron fuscum (Baba & Tokioka, 1965)
- Stiliger smaragdinus Baba, 1949
- Stiliger subviridis Baba, 1949
- Tambja amakusana Baba, 1987
- Tambja kushimotoensis Baba, 1987
- Tambja sagamiana (Baba, 1955)
- Thecacera picta Baba, 1972
- Thordisa parva Baba, 1938
- Thordisa sanguinea Baba, 1955
- Thorunna florens (Baba, 1949)
- Thuridilla livida (Baba, 1955)
- Thuridilla splendens (Baba, 1949)
- Trapania japonica (Baba, 1935) [Drepania]
- Tritonia insulae (Baba, 1955)
- Tritoniopsilla alba Baba, 1949

== Taxa named in honor of him ==
Genera:

- Babaina (synonym of Thorunna) Odhner, 1968
- Babakina Roller, 1973
- Babiella Risso-Dominguez, 1964

Species:

- Linguella babai Tchang-Si, 1934
- Marionopsis babai Odhner, 1936
- Elysia babai Pruvot-Fol, 1945
- Okenia babai Hamatani, 1961
- Tamanovalva babai Burn, 1965
- Flabellina babai Schmekel, 1970
- Cyerce kikutarobabai Hamatani, 1976
- Chelidonura babai Gosliner, 1988
- Phyllidia babai Brunckhorst 1993
- Hypselodoris babai Gosliner & Behrens 2000
- Philine babai Valdés, 2008

== Bibliography ==
- (in Japanese) Abe, T.; Baba, K. (1952). "Notes on the opisthobranch fauna of Toyama bay, western coast of middle Japan". Collecting & Breeding 14(9): 260–266.
- (in Japanese) Baba, K. (1930). "Studies on Japanese nudibranchs (1). Polyceridae". Venus 2(1): 4–9.
- (in Japanese) Baba, K. 1930. Studies on Japanese nudibranchs (2). A. Polyceridae. B. Okadaia, n.g. (preliminary report). Venus 2(2):43–50, pl. 2.
- Baba, K. 1930. Studies on Japanese nudibranchs (3). A. Phyllidiidae. B. Aeolididae. Venus 2(3):117–125, pl. 4.
- Baba, K. 1931. A noteworthy gill-less holohepatic nudibranch Okadaia elegans Baba, with reference to its internal anatomy. Annotationes Zoologicae Japonenses 13:63–89, pls. 5–7.
- (in Japanese) Baba, K. 1931. Morphological study on circulatory and excretory systems in Okadaia elegans Baba. Zoological Magazine, Japan [Dobutsugaku Zasshi] 43(507):1–6.
- (in Japanese) Baba, K. 1931b. Morphological significance of gill-less nudibranchs. Tokyo Bunrika Daigaku Gakugei [Tokyo Arts & Sciences University] 4:250–258.
- Baba, K. 1932. Pseudobornella orientalis, nov. gen. et sp. from Japan. Annotationes Zoologicae Japonenses 13(4):369–376.
- Baba, K. 1933. A pelagic nudibranch Cephalopyge orientalis, nov. sp. from Japan. Annotationes Zoologicae Japonenses 14(1):157- 163, pl. 7.
- Baba, K. 1933. Preliminary note on the Nudibranchia collected in the vicinity of the Amakusa Marine Biological Laboratory. Annotationes Zoologicae Japonenses 14(1):165–179.
- Baba, K. 1933. Supplementary note on the Nudibranchia collected in the vicinity of the Amakusa Marine Biological Laboratory. Annotationes Zoologicae Japonenses 14(2):273–283.
- (in Japanese) Baba, K. 1935. "A general sketch of the molluscs inhabiting the coral reefs of Okinawa Islands". Venus 5(2,3): 99–102, pls. 7–9.
- Baba, K. 1935. Report on the biological survey of Mutsu Bay (27) Nudibranchia of Mutsu Bay. Science Reports Tohoku Imperial University, series 4, Biology 10(2):331–360, pls. 5–7.
- Baba, K. 1935. Notes on a nudibranch, Madrella sanguinea (Angas), with reference to its papillary glands. Venus 5(4):181–187, pl. 10.
- Baba, K. 1935. The fauna of Akkeshi Bay. I. Opisthobranchia. Journal of the Faculty of Science, Hokkaido Imperial University, series 6, Zoology 4(3):115–125, pls. 7–8.
- Baba, K. 1936. Opisthobranchia of the Ryukyu (Okinawa) Islands. Journal Department Agriculture, Kyushu Imperial University 5(1):1- 50, pl. 1–3.
- Baba, K. 1937. Contribution to the knowledge of a nudibranch, Okadaia elegans Baba. Japanese Journal of Zoology 7(2):147–190.
- Baba, K. 1937. Record of a nudibranch, Gymnodoris striata (Eliot) from Amakusa, Japan. Zoological Magazine, Japan [Dobutsugaku Zasshi] 49(6):216–218.
- Baba, K. 1937. Opisthobranchia of Japan (I). Journal of the Department of Agriculture, Kyushu Imperial University 5(4):195–236, pl. 4.
- Baba, K. 1937. Opisthobranchia of Japan (II). Journal of the Department of Agriculture, Kyushu Imperial University 5(7):289–344, pls. 1–2.
- Baba, K. 1937. Two new species of the nudibranchiate genus Cadlina from Sagami Bay, Japan. Venus 7(2):75–80.
- Baba, K. 1937. Duvaucelia septemtrionalis nov. sp., a nudibranchiate mollusc from the Sea of Okhotsk. Zoological Magazine, Japan [Dobutsugaku Zasshi] 49(11):391–392.
- (in Japanese) Baba, K. 1937. Note on the colour variation of a dorid, Rostanga arbutus (Angas, 1864). Venus 7(1): 1–4.
- Baba, K. 1937. A new species of the nudibranchiate genus Marionia from Sagami Bay, Japan. Venus 7(3):116–120.
- Baba, K. 1937. Record of a nudibranch, Scyllaea pelagica Linne from Sagami Bay, Japan. Zoological Magazine, Japan [Dobutsugaku Zasshi] 49(7):247–249.
- Baba, K. 1937. Two new species of the nudibranchiate genus Notobryon from Sagami Bay, Japan. Venus 7(4):165–170.
- Baba, K. 1938. Opisthobranchia of Kii, middle Japan. Journal of the Department of Agriculture, Kyushu Imperial University 6(1):1- 19.
- Baba, K. 1938. Three new nudibranchs from Izu, Middle Japan. Annotationes Zoologicae Japonenses 17(2):130–133.
- Baba, K. 1940. Some additions to the nudibranch fauna of the northern part of Japan. Bulletin of the Biogeographical Society of Japan 10(6):103–111.
- Baba, K. 1940. Miamira flavicostata n. sp., a nudibranchiate mollusc from Amakusa, Japan. Zoological Magazine, Japan [Dobutsugaku Zasshi] 52(6):239–240.
- Baba, K. 1947. Mollusca, pp. 1012–1270. In: Illustrated encyclopedia of the fauna of Japan (exclusive of insects). Revised edition. Hokuryukan Co. Ltd., Tokyo.
- Baba, K. 1949. Opisthobranchia of Sagami Bay collected by His Majesty The Emperor of Japan. 194 pp., 50 pls. Iwanami Shoten, Tokyo.
- (in Japanese) Baba, K. 1951. Some notes on the behavior of a nudibranch Melibe vexillifera Bergh. Collecting & Breeding [Saishu to Shiiku] 13(2):64–65.
- (in Japanese) Baba, K. 1952. "珍稀なる嚢舌後鰓類一新種Lobiger(Lobiger)sagamiensis n. sp.に就いて". [Record of a rare sacoglossan mollusk, Lobiger (Lobiger) sagamiensis n. sp. from Sagami Bay, Japan]. Dobutsugaku zasshi (Zoological magazine), Zoological Society of Japan, 61(11): 337–338. abstract in English.
- Baba, K. 1953. Three new species and two new records of the genus Glossodoris from Japan. Publications of the Seto Marine Biological Laboratory 3(2):205–211.
- Baba, K. 1955. Opisthobranchia of Sagami Bay supplement, 59 pp., 20 pls. Iwanami Shoten, Tokyo.
- (in Japanese) Baba, K. 1955. Opisthobranch fauna in the vicinity of the Sado Marine Biological station, Sado Island, Japan Sea side. Collecting & Breeding [Saishu to Shiiku]17(6):165–168.
- (in Japanese) Baba, K. 1956. Ecological notes on the Opisthobranchia of Japan. I. The spawning habits (3). Collecting & Breeding [Saishu to Shiiku] 18(10):312–316.
- Baba, K. 1957. A revised list of the species of Opisthobranchia from the northern part of Japan, with some additional descriptions. J. Fac. Sci., Hokkaido Univ., ser. 6, Zool. 13(1–4):8–14.
- Baba, K. 1957. The species of the genus Elysia from Japan. Publ. Seto Mar. Biol. Lab. 6(1): 69–74, pls 3–4.
- (in Japanese) Baba, K. 1957. Ecological notes on the Opisthobranchia of Japan. I. The spawning habits (4). Collecting & Breeding [Saishu to Shiiku] 19(3):81–83.
- (in Japanese) Baba, K. 1957. Ecological notes on the Opisthobranchia of Japan. II. Abnormality. Collecting & Breeding [Saishu to Shiiku] 19(7): 219.
- (in Japanese) Baba, K. 1958. [Seashore life of Japan.] 148 pp., 5 pls. Hokuryukan Co. Ltd., Tokyo.
- Baba, K. 1959. A new record of an interesting species, Embletonia gracile Risbec, from Japan (Nudibranchia – Eolidacea). Publications of the Seto Marine Biological Laboratory 7(3):335–336, pl. 29.
- Baba, K. 1959. The family Stiligeridae from Japan (Opisthobranchia-Sacoglossa). Publ. Seto Mar. Biol. Lab. 7(3): 327–334, pls 27–28.
- Baba, K. 1959. The genus Petalifera and a new species, P. ramosa, from Japan. Publ. Seto Mar. Biol. Lab. 7(3): 337–338.
- Baba, K. 1960. The genera Polycera, Palio, Greilada and Thecacera from Japan (Nudibranchia – Polyceridae). Publications of the Seto Marine Biological Laboratory 8(1):75–78, pl. 6.
- Baba, K. 1960. In: Encyclopaedia Zoologica illustrated in colours. 3. Introduction, pp. 1–33, Mollusca, pp. 38–200, pls. 19- 91. Hokuryukan Co. Ltd., Tokyo.
- Baba, K. 1960. The genera Okenia, Goniodoridella and Goniodoris from Japan (Nudibranchia – Goniodorididae). Publications of the Seto Marine Biological Laboratory 8(1):79–83, pls. 7–8.
- Baba, K. 1960. Two new species of the genus Eubranchus from Japan (Nudibranchia – Eolidacea). Publications of the Seto Marine Biological Laboratory 8(2):299–302, pl. 34.
- Baba, K. 1960. The genera Gymnodoris and Nembrotha from Japan (Nudibranchia – Polyceridae). Publications of the Seto Marine Biological Laboratory 8(1):71–74, pl. 5.
- Baba, K. 1960. The genus Herviella and a new species, H. affinis, from Japan (Nudibranchia – Eolidacea). Publications of the Seto Marine Biological Laboratory 8(2):303–305.
- (in Japanese) Baba, K. 1960. Seashore life in Amami-Oshima Island. Collecting & Breeding [Saishu to Shiiku] 22(10–11):333–336.
- Baba, K. 1961. On two species of Doriopsis (syn. Ctenodoris) from Japan (Nudibranchia-Dorididae). Publ. Seto Mar. Biol. Lab. 9(1): 63–5
- Baba, K. 1961. The shells and radulae in Berthelinia, a bivalved sacoglossan genus. Venus 21(4): 389–401, pl 21
- Baba, K. 1961. The shells and radulae in Berthelinia, a bivalved sacoglossan genus. Venus 21(4): 389–401; pl 1.
- Baba, K. 1961. Three new species of the genus Catriona from Japan (Nudibranchia-Eolidacea). Publ. Seto Mar. Biol. Lab. 9(2): 367–372, pls 14–15.
- Baba, K. 1961. Three new species of the genus Catriona from Japan (Nudibranchia – Eolidacea). Publications of the Seto Marine Biological Laboratory 9(2):367–372, pls. 14–15.
- Baba, K. 1962. Anatomical review of Subcuthona pallida Baba (Nudibranchia – Eolidacea). Publications of the Seto Marine Biological Laboratory 10(2):241–243, pl.15.
- Baba, K. 1963. The anatomy of Cuthona futairo n.sp. (=C. bicolor of Baba, 1933) (Nudibranchia – Eolidoidea). Publications of the Seto Marine Biological Laboratory 11(1):109–117, pls. 5–6.
- Baba, K. 1964. Description of Eubranchus inabai n.sp., from Mukaishima, Japan (Nudibranchia – Eolidoidea). Publications of the Seto Marine Biological Laboratory 12(4):285–287.
- Baba, K. 1964. The anatomy of Rizzolia lineata (Eliot) (Nudibranchia – Eolidoidea). Publications of the Seto Marine Biological Laboratory 12(4):289–294, pls. 15–16.
- Baba, K. 1965. The anatomy of Facelinella quadrilineata (Baba) (Nudibranchia – Eolidoidea). Publications of the Seto Marine Biological Laboratory 12(5):409–414, pls. 26–27.
- Baba, K. 1965. Mollusca, pp. 1–326. In: New illustrated encyclopedia of the fauna of Japan, II. Hokuryukan Co. Ltd., Tokyo.
- Baba, K. 1966. Gross anatomy of the specimens of the shelled sacoglossan Volvatella (= Arthessa) collected from Okino-Erabu Island, Southern Kyushu, Japan (Nudibranchia). Publ. Seto Mar. Biol. Lab. 14(3): 197–205, pls 7–10.
- Baba, K. 1966. The anatomy of Herviella yatsui (Baba, 1930) and H. affinis Baba, 1960 (Nudibranchia – Eolidoidea). Publications of the Seto Marine Biological Laboratory 14:1–6, pls. 1–2.
- Baba, K. 1966. Record of Herviella albida n. sp. from Seto, Kii, Japan (Nudibranchia – Eolidoidea). Publications of the Seto Marine Biological Laboratory 13(5):361–363, pl. 15.
- Baba, K. 1967. Supplementary notes on the anatomy of Metaruncina setoensis (Baba, 1954), (N.G.) (Opisthobranchia-Cephalaspidea). Publications of the Seto Marine Biological Laboratory 15(3):185- 197.
- (in Japanese) Baba, K. 1968. [A collection of Tochuina tetraquetra (Pallas, 1788) from Shirikishinai, Hokkaido, Japan (Gastropoda: Nudibranchia).] Collecting & Breeding [Saishu to Shiiku] 30(8):257–258, figs. 1–5.
- Baba, K. 1968. A revised description of Alderia nigra Baba, 1937, type species of Alderiopsis, n.g., from Japan (Opisthobranchia-Sacoglossa). Bijdragen tot de Dierkunde 38: 5–11, pls. 1–2.
- (in Japanese) Baba, K. 1968. [On the identification of Tritonia festiva (Stearns, 1873) in Japan (Gastropoda: Nudibranchia).] Collecting & Breeding [Saishu to Shiiku] 30(8):258–259; figs. 1–2.
- Baba, K. 1969. List of the Species of the Opisthobranchia from the middle-Japan sea. unpublished, 4p. newsprint. [English & Japanese]
- Baba, K. 1969. Notes on the collection of Tritonia festiva (Stearns, 1873) from the seas of Japan (Gastropoda: Nudibranchia). Veliger 12(1):132–134, fig. 1.
- Baba, K. 1969. "Range extension of Tochuina tetraquetra (Pallas, 1788) to Hokkaido, North Japan (Gastropoda: Nudibranchia)". Veliger 12(1):134.
- Baba, K. 1969. List of the Pleurobranchidae and the Pleurobranchaeidae from Japan. Collecting and Breeding, 31(7):190–191, figs. 1–2. [Japanese; English title]
- Baba, K. 1969. "Taxonomic study on Tritoniopsis elegans (Audouin, 1826) from Seto, Japan (Nudibranchia – Dendronotoidea)". Publications of the Seto Marine Biological Laboratory 16(6): 395–398, pl. 26.
- Baba, K. 1969. Records of Learchis indica Bergh, 1896 from Japan and Hawaii (Nudibranchia: Eolidoidea). Publications of the Seto Marine Biological Laboratory 16(6):399–403, pl. 27.
- (in Japanese) Baba, K. 1970. [List of the Aplysiidae from Japan.] Collecting & Breeding 32(3): 94–96; figs. 1–5.
- (in Japanese) Baba, K. 1970. [List of the Gastropteridae and the Runcinidae from Japan.] Collecting & Breeding 32(2): 46–48; figs. 1–9.
- Baba, K. 1971. Pleurobranchus hirasei n. sp., proposed for a mollusc formerly known as Oscanius testudinarius: Hirase 1927, from Japan (Opisthobranchia:Notaspidea). Venus 30(1): 23–28, pl 3.
- (in Japanese) Baba, K. 1971. New record in Japan of Doto (Doto) pita Marcus, 1955, a nudibranch gastropod. Appendix: list of the Dotoidae from Japan. Collecting & Breeding[Saishu to Shiiku] 33(6):131–132.
- Baba, K. 1971. Anatomical studies on three species of Doto (D. bella, D. japonica and D. pita) from Japan (Nudibranchia: Dendronotoidea: Dotoidae). Publications of the Seto Marine Biological Laboratory 19(2/3):73-79, pls. 4–5.
- Baba, K. 1971. Review of the anatomical aspects of Eubranchus misakiensis Baba, 1969 from Mukaishima, Japan (Nudibranchia: Eolidoidea: Eubranchidae). Venus 30(2):63–66, pl. 6.
- Baba, K. 1971. Description of Doto (Doto) fragilis nipponensis subspec. nov. from Sagami Bay, Japan (Nudibranchia: Dendronotoidea: Dotoidae). Veliger 14(2):153–154.
- Baba, K. 1971. Supplementary note on the anatomy of Eubranchus virginalis (Baba, 1949) from Japan (Nudibranchia: Eolidoidea: Eubranchidae). Publications of the Seto Marine Biological Laboratory 19(1):39–42, pl. 1.
- Baba, K. 1972. Thecacera picta spec. nov. from Suruga Bay, Japan (Nudibranchia: Doridoidea: Polyceridae). Veliger 15(2):88- 90.
- Robilliard, G.A. & Baba, K. (1972). "Aldisa sanguinea cooperi subsp. nov. from the coast of the state of Washington, with notes on its feeding and spawning habits (Nudibranchia, Dorididae, Aldisinae)". Pub. Seto Marine Biol. Lab., 19(6, March): 409–414.
- Baba, K. 1974. Notes on Lobiger souverbii Fischer, 1856, re-identified, of Japan (Opisthobranchia: Sacoglossa: Lobigeridae). Collecting & Breeding 36(4): 74–77.
- Baba, K. 1974. Some Comments on Lobiger-Souverbii Re Identified of Japan Opisthobranchia Sacoglossa Lobigeridae. Veliger 16 (3). 1974. 253–257.
- (in Japanese) Baba, K. 1974. List of the species of Phestilla from the central and western Pacific. Chiribotan (Newsletter of the Malacological Society of Japan) 8(3): 51–52.
- Baba, K. 1974. New distributional record of Aegires punctilucens (d'Orbigny, 1837) from Sado Island, Japan (Nudibranchia: Doridoidea: Aegiretidae). Veliger 17(1):11–12.
- (in Japanese) Baba, K. 1974. Aegires punctilucens (d'Orbigny, 1837) new to Japan (Opisthobranchia: Doridoidea: Aegiretidae). Collecting & Breeding [Saishu to Shiiku] 36(10):198–199.
- (in Japanese) Baba, K. 1974. The late Prof. Emer. Dr. Hiroshi Ohshima (Kyushu University): his life and zoological works. Collecting & Breeding [Saishu to Shiiku] 36(5):103–107.
- (in Japanese) Baba, K. 1975. Notes on some opisthobranchiate molluscs from Ayukawa, Echizen coast, Japan Sea side of Middle Japan. III. Nudibranchia. Collecting & Breeding [Saishu to Shiiku] 37(9):211- 212.
- Baba, K. 1975. Description of Trinchesia diversicolor spec. nov. from the Japan Sea coast of Middle Japan (Nudibranchia: Eolidoidea: Cuthonidae). Veliger 17(3):251–254.
- Baba, K. 1975. Supplementary note on the internal anatomy of a mollusc Eubranchus horii Baba, 1960 (Nudibranchia: Eolidoidea: Eubranchidae). Zoological Magazine, Japan [Dobutsugaku Zasshi] 84(1):77–78.
- Baba, K. 1975. An outline of the Phyllidiidae of Japan (Nudibranchia: Doridoidea). Collecting & Breeding [Saishu to Shiiku] 37(11):257–260.
- Baba, K. 1975. On two species of Eubranchus from Ayukawa, Echizen coast, Japan Sea side of Middle Japan (Nudibranchia: Eolidoidea: Eubranchidae). Venus 34(3–4):65–72.
- Baba, K. 1976. Two new species and five common or rare species of the genus Dermatobranchus from Japan (Nudibranchia: Arminoidea: Arminidae). Veliger 19(1):4–12.
- Baba, K. 1976. Two species of Nembrotha (s.s.) new to Japan (Nudibranchia: Doridoidea: Polyceridae). Veliger 19(2):131–134.
- (in Japanese) Baba, K. 1976. Record of Phyllidia zebrina n. sp. from Sagami Bay, Japan (Nudibranchia: Doridoidea: Phyllidiidae). Venus 35(1):5–8.
- Baba, K. 1976. The genus Cerberilla of Japan (Nudibranchia: Eolidoidea: Aeolidiidae), with the description of a new species. Veliger 18(3):272–280.
- Baba, K. 1977. Notes on Roboastra gracilis (Bergh, 1877) (Nudibranchia: Doridoidea: Polyceridae) obtained from Seto, Kii, Middle Japan. Veliger 19(3):290–292.
- Baba, K. 1979. Short account of the anatomy of a nudibranchiate mollusk; Aeolidiella takanosimensis Baba, 1930 from Japan (Eolidoidea: Aeolidiidae). Veliger 22(1):12–18.
- Baba, K. 1979. Brief comment on the identification of a nudibranchiate mollusk, Aeolidiella takanosimensis Baba, 1930, from Amakusa, Japan (Eolidoidea:Aeolidiidae). Publications of the Amakusa Marine Biological Laboratory, Kyushu University 5(1):1–7.
- Baba, K. 1984. Supplementary information on the morphology of Phestilla melanobranchia Bergh, 1874, from Seto, Kii, Middle Japan (Nudibranchia: Aeolidacea:Tergipedidae). Veliger 26(4):241- 247.
- Baba, K. 1984. A new species of the genus Cuthona (s.l.) (Nudibranchia: Eolidacea) from Sagami Bay, Japan. Venus 43(2):125–128.
- (in Japanese) Baba, K. 1984. Dendrodoris tuberculosa in color from Seto, Kii, Japan. Collecting & Breeding [Saishu to Shiiku] 46(8):back cover.
- (in Japanese) Baba, K. 1984. Eolids in color from Tomioka, Amakusa, Japan. Collecting & Breeding [Saishu to Shiiku] 46(7):back cover.
- Baba, K. 1984. Personal notes. Shells & Sea Life 16(1):3.
- Baba, K. 1985. An illustrated key to the Chromodoridinae genera of Japan (Mollusca: Nudibranchia:Dorididae). Shells & Sea Life 17(10):225–228.
- Baba, K. 1985. Anatomical review of a cephalaspidean mollusk, Nakamigawaia spiralis Kuroda & Habe in Habe, 1961, (Aglajidae), from Japan. Spec Publ, Mukaishima Mar Biol Sta., 1985, pp 1–5.
- Baba, K. 1986. Description of a New Species of Nudibranchiate Mollusca, Paradoris tsurugensis, Dorididae, from Japan. Bolm. Zool., Univ. S. Paulo, 10:1–8, figs.1–3. [Parodoris granulata, Parodoris mulciber, Percunas mulciber].
- (in Japanese) Baba, K. 1986. Hexabranchus of Japan in color. Collecting & Breeding [Saishu to Shiiku] 48(7):back cover.
- Baba, K. 1986. Janolus in Japan. Shells & Sea Life 18(11):182–184.
- (in Japanese) Baba, K. 1986. Nouméa purpurea Baba, 1949 from Akazumi, W. coast of Noto Peninsula, Japan. Janolus (Takaoka Biological Club) (67):1.
- Baba, K. 1987. Two new green-colored species of Tambja from Japan (Nudibranchia: Polyceridae). Venus 46(1):13–18.
- Baba, K. 1987. A new species of Nouméa from Ogi, Toyama Bay and vicinity, Japan (Nudibranchia: Chromodorididae). Venus 46(1):19–24.
- (in Japanese) Baba, K. 1987. Nouméa sp. from Echizencho, Echizen coast, Japan. Janolus (Takaoka Biological Club) (69):2.
- (in Japanese) Baba, K. 1987. Nouméa nivalis Baba, 1937 from Fukuura, W. coast of Noto Peninsula, Japan. Janolus (Takaoka Biological Club) (69):1.
- (in Japanese) Baba, K. 1987. Chromodoris sinensis Rudman, 1985 = Glossodoris marginata of Baba, 1938 from Akazumi and Fukuura, W. coast of Noto Peninsula, Japan.Janolus (Takaoka Biological Club) (68):1.
- (in Japanese) Baba, K. 1987. Janolus in Japan (abstracted). Janolus (Takaoka Biological Club) (70): 2–3.
- Baba, K. 1987. Anatomical review of Coryphella from Akkeshi Bay, Hokkaido, northern Japan (Nudibranchia: Flabellinidae s.l.). Venus 46(3):151–156.
- Baba, K. 1987. A new species of Coryphella from Toyama Bay, Japan (Nudibranchia: Flabellinidae s.l.). Venus 46(3):147–150.
- Baba, K. 1988. Anatomical information on Thorunna (=Babaina) (Nudibranchia: Chromodorididae) from Toyama Bay and vicinity, Japan. Veliger 30(3):325–328.
- (in Japanese) Baba, K. 1988. Colorful slugs. Collecting & Breeding [Saishu to Shiiku] 50(4): 150.
- (in Japanese) Baba, K. 1988. Studies on Opisthobranchia by H. M. the Emperor of Japan. Collecting & Breeding [Saishu to Shiiku] 50(4): 162–163.
- (in Japanese) Baba, K. 1988. Japanese Opisthobranchia of difficult identification. Collecting & Breeding [Saishu to Shiiku] 50(4): 164.
- Baba, K. 1988. Anatomical review of Diaphorodoris (=Lamellidoridella) from Japan (Nudibranchia: Onchidorididae). Venus 47(2):83–87.
- Baba, K. 1988. Comparative study on two species of Glossodoris from Japan (Nudibranchia: Chromodorididae) Venus 47(3):158–166, 6 figs. [G.misakinosibogae n.sp., G. atromarginata, Japanese summary]
- Baba, K. 1988. Dendrodoris tuberculosa (Q. & G. 1832; Doris), variety form, from Ishigaki-shima, Okinawa, Japan. Shells & Sea Life 20(4):17.
- Baba, K. 1988. Comment on Doris lacera, from Timor, Indonesia. Shells & Sea Life 20(7):11–12.
- (in Japanese) Baba, K. 1988. Diaphorodoris mitsuii (Baba, 1938) from Kinoura, Noto Peninsula, Japan. Janolus (Takaoka Biological Club) (72): 1.
- Baba, K. 1989–03. More study on two species of Mexichromis from Japan (Nudibranchia: Chromodorididae). Venus 48(1):12–20, figs. 1–5. [M. multituberculata comb. n.; M. festiva; Japanese summary]
- Baba, K. 1989–03. Taxonomical study on two species of the "aureopurpurea" color group of Chromodoris from Japan (Nudibranchia: Chromodorididae). Venus 48(1):21–26, 3 figs. [C. aureopurpurea, C. colingwoodi, Japanese summary]
- Baba, K. 1989–06. Description of a new species, Paradoris tsurugensis, from Japan (Nudibranchia: Dorididae). Venus 48(2):73–78, 3 figs. [Japanese summary]
- Baba, K. 1989–06. An identification of Chromodoris leopardus Rudman, 1987 from Japan (Nudibranchia: Chromodorididae). Venus 48(2):96–98, 2 figs. [Japanese summary]
- Baba, K. 1989. Review of the genus Ceratosoma from Japan (Nudibranchia: Chromodorididae). Venus 48(3):141–149.
- Baba, K. 1989. A new distributional record of Gymnodoris ceylonica (Kelaart, 1858) from Sagami Bay, Japan. Venus 48(3):192–194.
- Baba, K. 1989. Description of a new species of nudibranchiate Mollusca, Paradoris tsurugensis, Dorididae, from Japan. Boletim de Zoologia, Universidade de São Paulo 10:1–8.
- Baba, K. 1989. Review of the genus Kaloplocamus from Japan (Nudibranchia: Polyceridae s.l.). Venus 48(4):231–243.
- Baba, K. 1990. Notes on the rare genera Trapania and Ancula from Japan with the description of a new species (Nudibranchia: Goniodorididae). Venus 49(1):8–18.
- Baba, K. 1990. Two Small Species of Philine New of Japan (Cephalaspidea: Philinidae). Venus, 49(3):181–187, pl. 1, figs. 1–2. [Philine orca, Philine rubrata].
- Baba, K. 1991. Taxonomical study on some species of the genus Phyllodesmium from Cape Muroto-misaki, Shikoku, and Okinawa Province, southern Japan (Nudibranchia: Facelinidae). Venus 50(2):109–124.
- Baba, K. 1991. The anatomy of Phyllodesmium serratum (Baba, 1949) from Japan (Nudibranchia: Facelinidae). Venus 50(2):101–108.
- Baba, K. 1991. Review of the genus Rostanga of Japan with the description of a new species (Nudibranchia: Dorididae). Venus 50(2):43–54.
- Baba, K. 1992. Comment on the taxonomy of Protaeolidiella atra Baba, 1955 and an allied species (Mollusca: Nudibranchia: Aeolidiidae) from Japan. Report of the Sado Marine Biological Station (22):29–35.
- Baba, K. 1992. Critical review of Dermatobranchus striatus van Hasselt, 1824 (Nudibranchia: Arminidae) with the description of a new species. Venus 50(4):239–248.
- Baba, K. 1993. A northern species of Dendronotus (Mollusca: Nudibranchia: Dendronotidae) from Sado Island, Sea of Japan. Report of the Sado Marine Biological Station (23):29–33.
- Baba, K. 1993. A new species of Dendrodoris (Mollusca: Nudibranchia: Dendrodorididae) from Sado Island, Sea of Japan. Report of the Sado Biological Station (23):25–28.
- Baba, K. 1993. Two new species of Carminodoris (Nudibranchia: Dorididae) from Japan. Venus 52(3):223–234.
- Baba, K. 1988. Dendrodoris tuberculosa (Q. & G. 1832; Doris), variety form, from Ishigaki-shima, Okinawa, Japan. Shells & Sea Life 20(4):17.
- Baba, K. 1988. Comment on Doris lacera, from Timor, Indonesia. Shells & Sea Life 20(7):11–12.
- (in Japanese) Baba, K. 1988. Diaphorodoris mitsuii (Baba, 1938) from Kinoura, Noto Peninsula, Japan. Janolus (Takaoka Biological Club) (72):1.
- Baba, K. 1989–03. More study on two species of Mexichromis from Japan (Nudibranchia: Chromodorididae). Venus 48(1):12–20, figs. 1–5. [M. multituberculata comb. n.; M. festiva; Japanese summary]
- Baba, K. 1989–03. Taxonomical study on two species of the "aureopurpurea" color group of Chromodoris from Japan (Nudibranchia: Chromodorididae). Venus 48(1):21–26, 3 figs. [C. aureopurpurea, C. colingwoodi, Japanese summary]
- Baba, K. 1989–06. Description of a new species, Paradoris tsurugensis, from Japan (Nudibranchia: Dorididae). Venus 48(2):73–78, 3 figs. [Japanese summary]
- Baba, K. 1989–06. An identification of Chromodoris leopardus Rudman, 1987 from Japan (Nudibranchia: Chromodorididae). Venus 48(2):96–98, 2 figs. [Japanese summary]
- Baba, K. 1989. Review of the genus Ceratosoma from Japan (Nudibranchia: Chromodorididae). Venus 48(3):141–149.
- Baba, K. 1989. A new distributional record of Gymnodoris ceylonica (Kelaart, 1858) from Sagami Bay, Japan. Venus 48(3):192–194.
- Baba, K. 1989. Description of a new species of nudibranchiate Mollusca, Paradoris tsurugensis, Dorididae, from Japan. Boletim de Zoologia, Universidade de São Paulo 10:1–8.
- Baba, K. 1989. Review of the genus Kaloplocamus from Japan (Nudibranchia: Polyceridae s.l.). Venus 48(4):231–243.
- Baba, K. 1990. Notes on the rare genera Trapania and Ancula from Japan with the description of a new species (Nudibranchia: Goniodorididae). Venus 49(1):8–18.
- Baba, K. 1990. Two Small Species of Philine New of Japan (Cephalaspidea: Philinidae). Venus, 49(3):181–187, pl. 1, figs. 1–2. [Philine orca, Philine rubrata].
- Baba, K. 1991. Taxonomical study on some species of the genus Phyllodesmium from Cape Muroto-misaki, Shikoku, and Okinawa Province, southern Japan (Nudibranchia: Facelinidae). Venus 50(2):109–124.
- Baba, K. 1991. The anatomy of Phyllodesmium serratum (Baba, 1949) from Japan (Nudibranchia: Facelinidae). Venus 50(2):101–108.
- Baba, K. 1991. Review of the genus Rostanga of Japan with the description of a new species (Nudibranchia: Dorididae). Venus 50(2):43–54.
- Baba, K. 1992. Comment on the taxonomy of Protaeolidiella atra Baba, 1955 and an allied species (Mollusca: Nudibranchia: Aeolidiidae) from Japan. Report of the Sado Marine Biological Station (22):29–35.
- Baba, K. 1992. Critical review of Dermatobranchus striatus van Hasselt, 1824 (Nudibranchia: Arminidae) with the description of a new species. Venus 50(4):239–248.
- Baba, K. 1993. A northern species of Dendronotus (Mollusca: Nudibranchia: Dendronotidae) from Sado Island, Sea of Japan. Report of the Sado Marine Biological Station (23):29–33.
- Baba, K. 1993. A new species of Dendrodoris (Mollusca: Nudibranchia: Dendrodorididae) from Sado Island, Sea of Japan.
- Baba, K. & Abe, T. 1964. A catrionid, Catriona beta n. sp., with a radula of Cuthona type (Nudibranchia-Eolidoidea). Annual Report of the Noto Marine Biological Laboratory, 4: 9–14.
- Baba K. & Hamatani I. 1963. A cuthonid, Cuthona alpha n. sp., with a radula of Catriona type (Nudibranchia Eolidoidea). Publications of the Seto Marine Biological Laboratory, 11(2): 339–343. [31 December 1963]
- Hamatani I. & Baba, K. 2003. "A New Record of Aplysia (Varria) extraordinaria (Allan, 1932) (Opisthobranchia: Anaspidea) from Suruga Bay, Japan".
- Kawaguti S. & Baba K. 1959. "A preliminary note on a two-valved sacoglossan gastropod, Tamanovalva limax, n. gen., n. sp., from Tamano, Japan". Biological Journal Okayama University 5(3–4): 177–184.
