= Johan Conrad van Hasselt =

Dutch zoologist and botanist

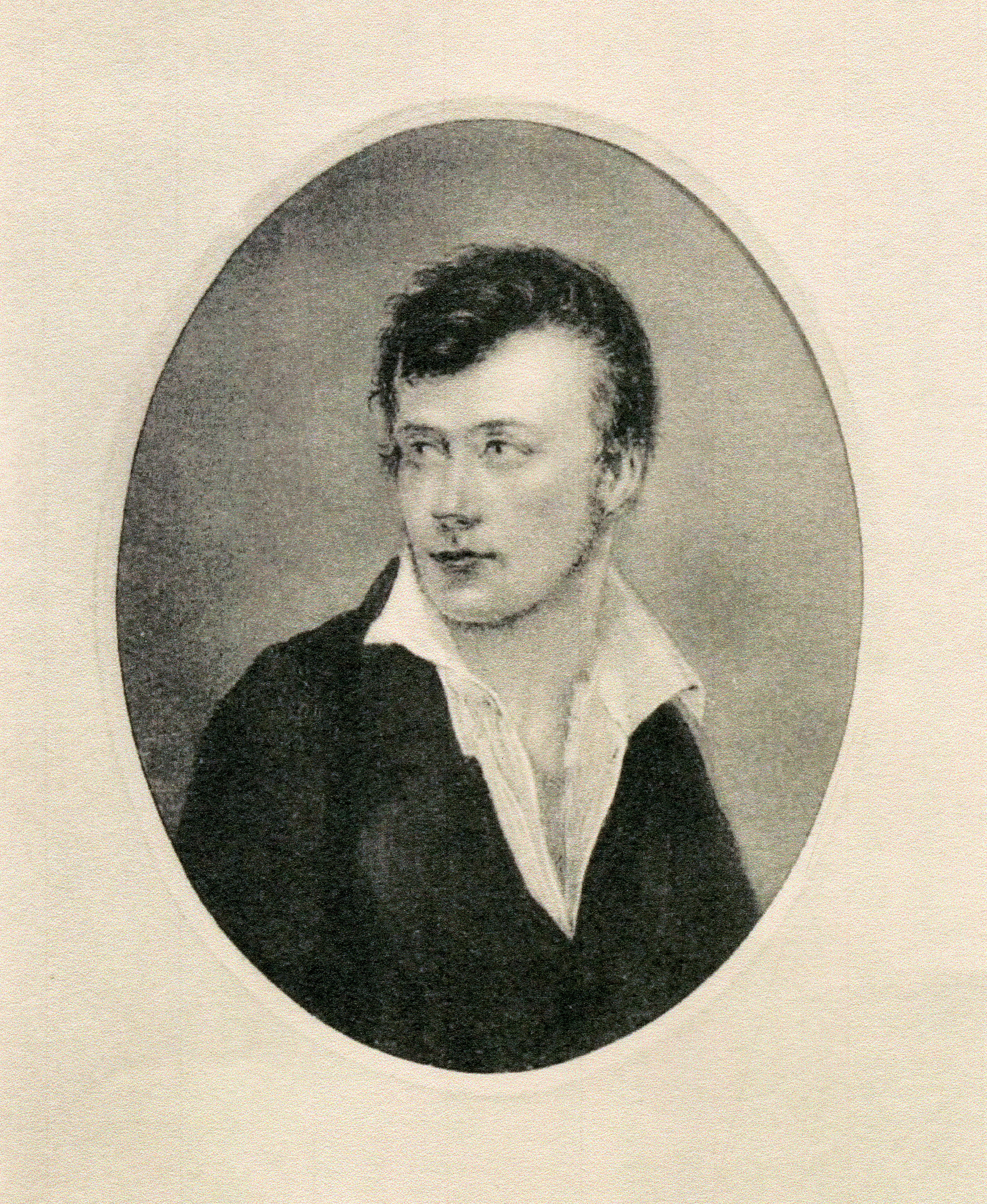
Johan Conrad van Hasselt

Johan Conrad van Hasselt (occasionally Johan Coenraad van Hasselt; 24 June 1797 in Doesburg – 8 September 1823), was a Dutch medical doctor, zoologist, botanist and mycologist.

Conrad van Hasselt studied medicine at the University of Groningen.

In 1820 he went on an expedition to the island of Java, then part of the colonial Dutch East Indies, with his friend Heinrich Kuhl, to study the fauna and flora of the island. They sailed from Texel on 11 July, stopping at Madeira, the Cape of Good Hope and Cocos Island and arriving in Batavia in December 1820. Kuhl died after eight months, van Hasselt continued the work for another two years before dying (like Kuhl) of disease and exhaustion. This followed a journey to Bantam. They sent the Museum of Leiden 200 skeletons, 200 skins of mammals from 65 species, 2,000 bird skins, 1,400 fish, 300 reptiles and amphibians, and many insects and crustaceans.

== Works ==
- Heinrich Kuhl and Johan Conrad van Hasselt. 1820. Beiträge zur Zoologie und Vergleichende anatomie (Contributions to zoology and comparative anatomy). Ed. Hermann. 212 pp.
- 1820 Dissertatio medico-anatomical observation of metamorphosi inauguralis exhibens quarumdam partium Ranae temporariae ... Ed apud I. Oomkens. 51 pp.
- Tyson R Roberts. 1993. The freshwater fishes of Java, as observed by Kuhl and van Hasselt in 1820-23. Leiden : Nationaal Natuurhistorisch Museum. 94 pp.

== Commemorations ==
- Hasseltia (H.B.K. 1825); botanical family Salicaceae.
- Hasseltiopsis (Sleumer 1938); botanical family Salicaceae.
- Kuhlhasseltia, named with Heinrich Kuhl (J.J.Sm. 1910); botanical family Orchidaceae.

== See also ==
- Category:Taxa named by Johan Conrad van Hasselt
