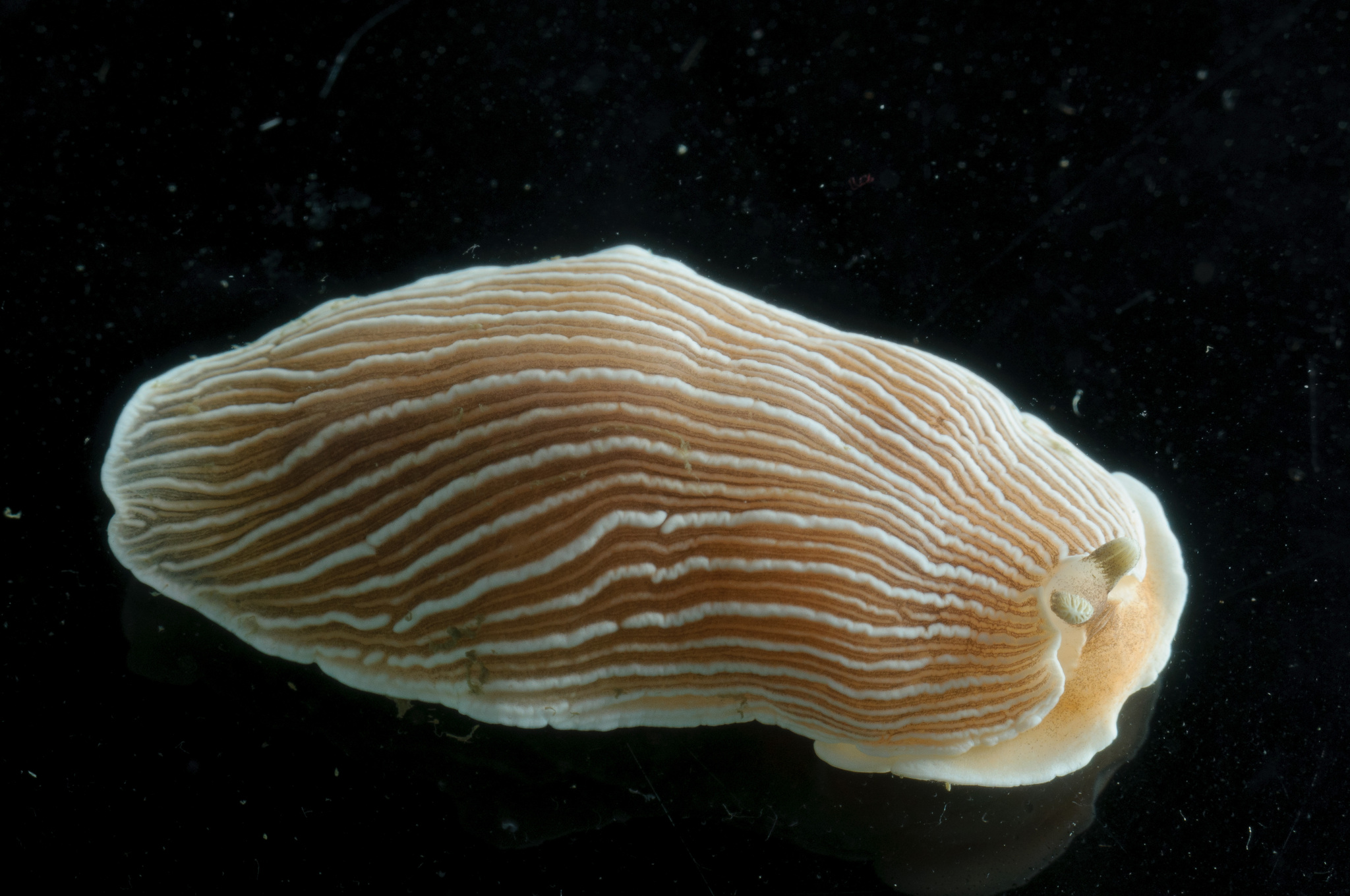
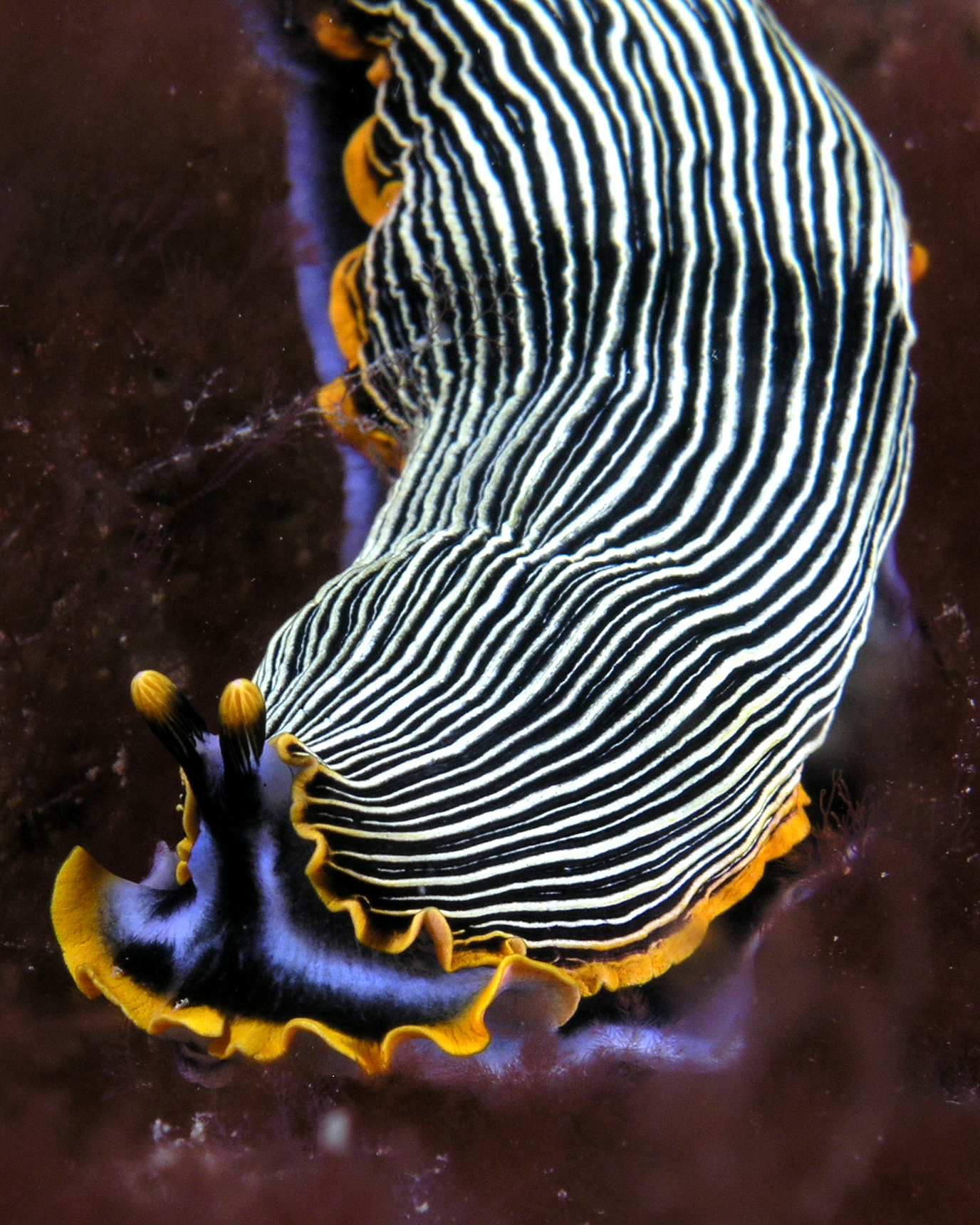
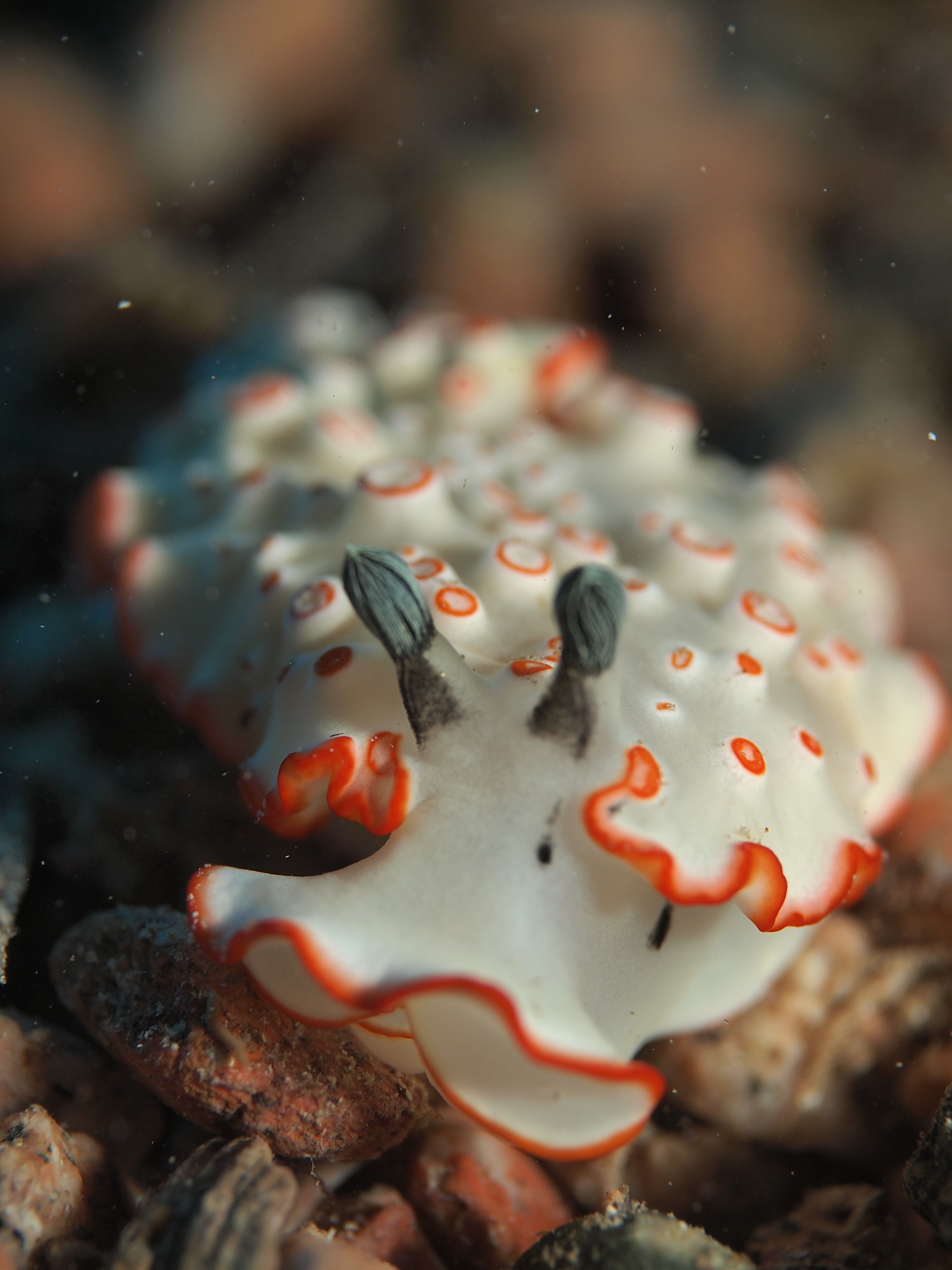
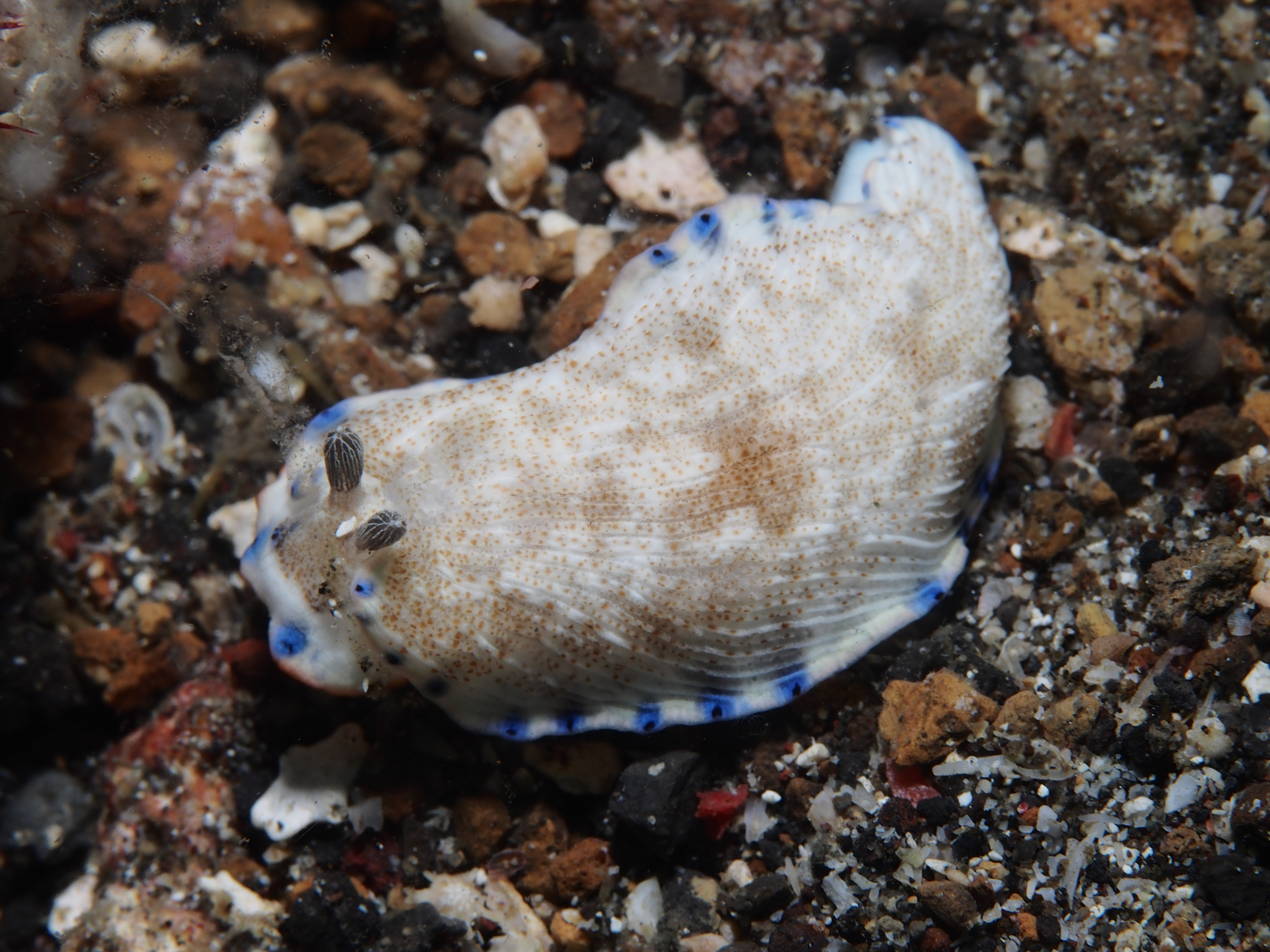
- From left to right in each row, from top to bottom: Armina californica, Armina occulta, Dermatobranchus ornatus, and Dermatobranchus caeruleomaculatus

Scientific classification
- Kingdom: Animalia
- Phylum: Mollusca
- Class: Gastropoda
- Order: Nudibranchia
- Suborder: Arminacea
- Superfamily: Arminoidea; Iredale & O’Donoghue, 1923
- Family: Arminidae; Iredale & O'Donoghue, 1923

Type genus
- Armina Rafinesque, 1814

Genera
- See text

Synonyms
- Dermatobranchidae P. Fischer, 1883; Diphyllidiidae A. d'Orbigny, 1841; Pleuroleuridae Bergh, 1874; Pleurophyllidiidae H. Adams & A. Adams, 1854

= Arminidae =

Family of gastropods

Arminidae is a family of nudibranchs, shell-less marine gastropod molluscs or sea slugs, and the only member of the superfamily Arminoidea.

== Classification ==
The following genera are recognised in the family Arminidae:

- Armina Rafinesque, 1814
- Atthila Bergh, 1899
- Dermatobranchus van Hasselt, 1824
- Histiomena Mörch, 1859
- Pleurophyllidiella Eliot, 1903
- Pleurophyllidiopsis S. Tchang, 1934

A 2020 molecular analysis by Korshunova and Martynov recovered the following phylogenetic tree, where Doridomorpha, Doridoxa, and Heterodoris form a clade sister to the family Arminidae:

- - Dendronotoidea
  - - Tritoniidae
    - - Arminidae
        - Armina
        - Dermatobranchus
      - - Doridoxidae
          Doridoxa
        - - Doridomorphidae
            Doridomorpha
          - Heterodorididae
            Heterodoris
