= Herviella mietta =

Scientific classification
- Kingdom: Animalia
- Phylum: Mollusca
- Class: Gastropoda
- Order: Nudibranchia
- Suborder: Aeolidacea
- Family: Facelinidae
- Genus: Herviella
- Species: H. mietta

Binomial name
- Herviella mietta Er. Marcus & Burch, 1965

Species of gastropod

Herviella mietta is a species of sea slug, an aeolid nudibranch, a marine gastropod mollusc in the family Facelinidae.

== Distribution ==
This species was described from Eniwetok Atoll. It has been reported from Hawaii and Japan.
