= Anetarca armata =

Scientific classification
- Kingdom: Animalia
- Phylum: Mollusca
- Class: Gastropoda
- Order: Nudibranchia
- Suborder: Aeolidacea
- Family: Facelinidae
- Genus: Anetarca
- Species: A. armata

Binomial name
- Anetarca armata Gosliner, 1991

Species of gastropod

Anetarca armata is a species of sea slug, specifically an aeolid nudibranch. It is a marine gastropod mollusc in the family Facelinidae.

== Distribution ==
This species was described from the Pacific Ocean coast of Baja California at Punta Asuncion, 27.1255°N 114.2939°W, Mexico. It is reported from Bahía de los Ángeles, within the Gulf of California.
