= Anetarca brasiliana =

Scientific classification
- Kingdom: Animalia
- Phylum: Mollusca
- Class: Gastropoda
- Order: Nudibranchia
- Suborder: Aeolidacea
- Family: Facelinidae
- Genus: Anetarca
- Species: A. brasiliana

Binomial name
- Anetarca brasiliana García & Troncoso, 2004

Species of gastropod

Anetarca brasiliana is a species of sea slug, specifically an aeolid nudibranch. It is a marine gastropod mollusc in the family Facelinidae.

== Distribution ==
This species was described from the intertidal zone at Praia de Armação, Armação dos Búzios, on the Atlantic Ocean coast of Brazil.
