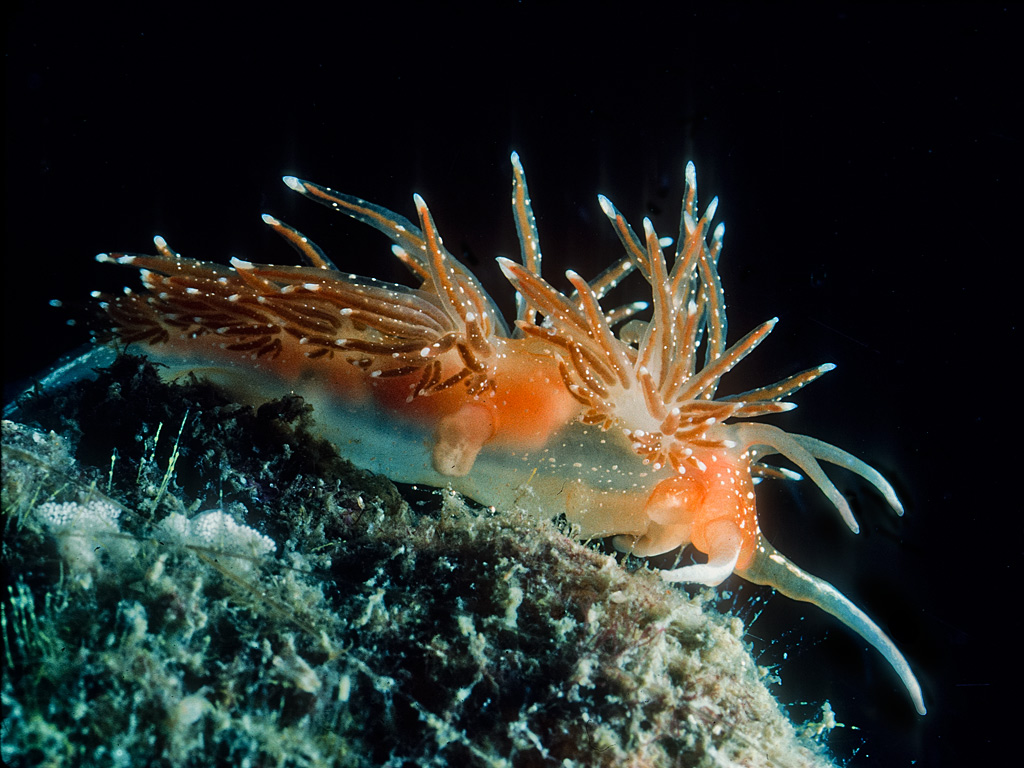
- The nudibranch Sakuraeolis enosimensis, Hong Kong.

Scientific classification
- Kingdom: Animalia
- Phylum: Mollusca
- Class: Gastropoda
- Order: Nudibranchia
- Suborder: Aeolidacea
- Family: Facelinidae
- Genus: Sakuraeolis
- Species: S. enosimensis

Binomial name
- Sakuraeolis enosimensis (Baba, 1930)

= Sakuraeolis enosimensis =

Species of gastropod

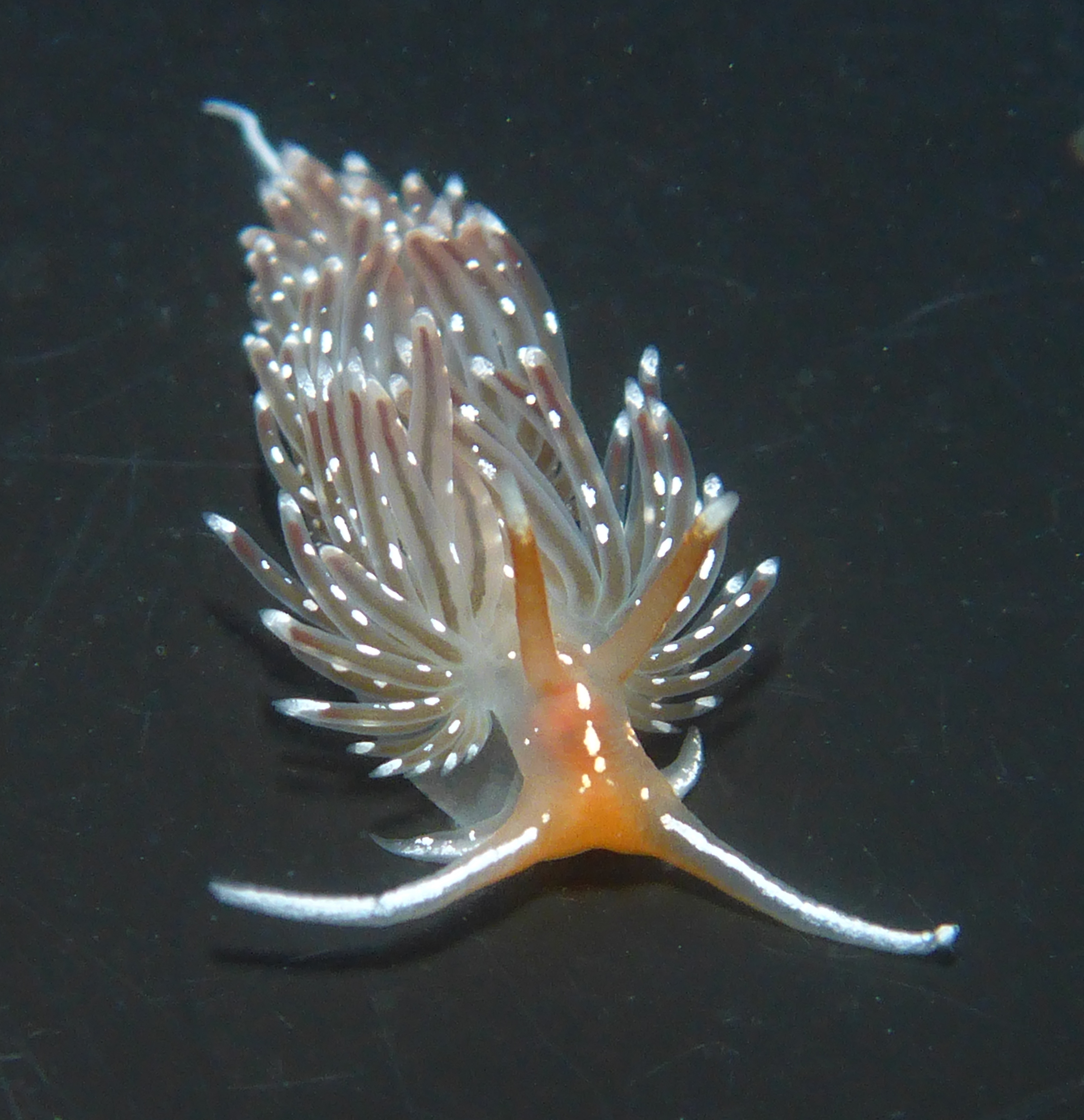
Sakuraeolis cf. enosimensis from San Francisco Bay Area, Redwood City, California

Sakuraeolis enosimensis is a species of sea slug, an aeolid nudibranch, a marine gastropod mollusc in the family Facelinidae.

== Description ==
S. enosimensis is usually 25-30 mm, but can be up to 45mm. The color can vary because of the color of internal organs, but is usually translucent yellow. The oral tentacles and tail are marked with an opaque white line down the middle, while the cerata and rhinophores have white tips. The cerata and head are also covered with opaque white spots.

== Reproduction ==
S. enosimensis is a hermaphrodite.

== Distribution ==
S. enosimensis is native to the Northwest Pacific. It is an invasive species in the San Francisco Bay Area, California, United States. S. enosimensis cannot be found anywhere else on the west coast.
