= Facelinopsis pacodelucia =

Scientific classification
- Kingdom: Animalia
- Phylum: Mollusca
- Class: Gastropoda
- Order: Nudibranchia
- Suborder: Aeolidacea
- Family: Facelinidae
- Genus: Facelinopsis
- Species: F. pacodelucia

Binomial name
- Facelinopsis pacodelucia Ortea, Moro & Caballer, 2014

Species of gastropod

Facelinopsis pacodelucia is a species of sea slug, an aeolid nudibranch, a marine gastropod mollusc in the family Facelinidae.

== Distribution ==
This species was described from specimens collected in Algeciras harbour (type locality) and Ceuta, Spain.

== Etymology ==
This species is named as a tribute to flamenco guitarist Paco de Lucía, who was born in Algeciras and died 10 months prior to the publication of the description.
