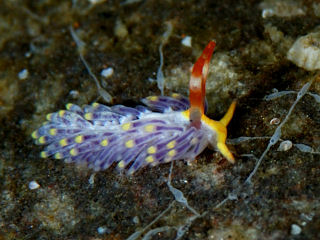
- Antonietta janthina

Scientific classification
- Kingdom: Animalia
- Phylum: Mollusca
- Class: Gastropoda
- Order: Nudibranchia
- Suborder: Aeolidacea
- Family: Facelinidae
- Genus: Antonietta
- Species: A. janthina

Binomial name
- Antonietta janthina Baba & Hamatani, 1977

= Antonietta janthina =

Species of gastropod

Antonietta janthina is a colourful species of sea slug or aeolid nudibranch, a marine gastropod mollusc in the family Facelinidae.

== Distribution ==
This nudibranch is known from south-east Japan. For decades, a similarly coloured species found in Indonesia, the Philippines and Thailand was thought to be a tropical variant, however it is now known to be the separate species Trinchesia nakapila.

== Description ==
Antonietta janthina has a whitish body with white surface pigment. The numerous cerata have a blue digestive gland inside them and superficial yellowish or white pigment covering the tips. The oral tentacles are bright orange-yellow and there is a median band of the same colour on the head. The rhinophores are scarlet with a median band of white.
