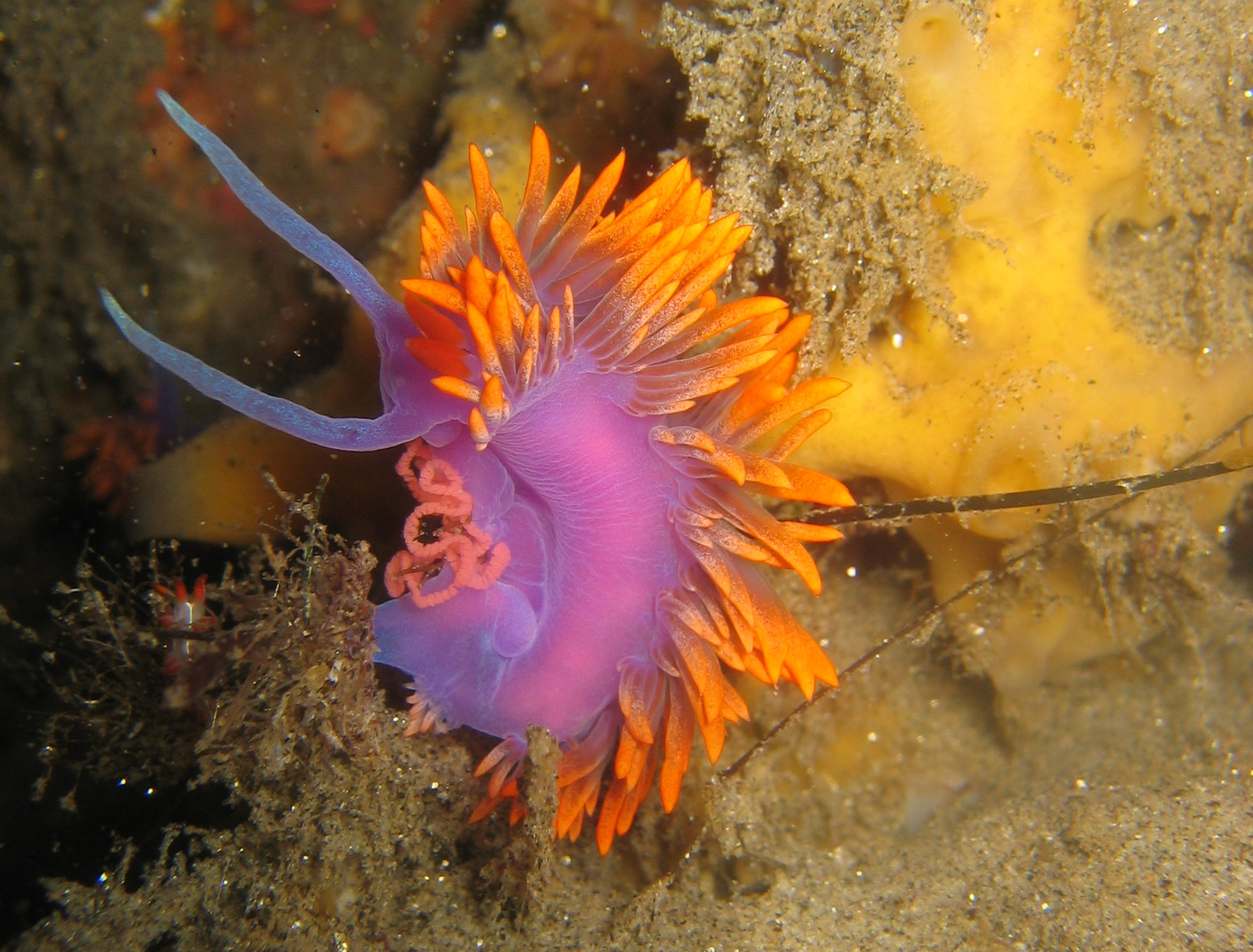
- Flabellinopsis iodinea

Scientific classification
- Kingdom: Animalia
- Phylum: Mollusca
- Class: Gastropoda
- Order: Nudibranchia
- Suborder: Aeolidacea
- Superfamily: Fionoidea
- Family: Flabellinopsidae; Korshunova, Martynov, Bakken, Evertsen, Fletcher, Mudianta, Saito, Lundin, Schrödl & Picton, 2017

Type genus
- Flabellinopsis

Genera
- See text

= Flabellinopsidae =

Family of gastropods

Flabellinopsidae is a family of nudibranchs, shell-less marine gastropod molluscs or sea slugs, in the superfamily Flabellinoidea.

== Genera ==
According to Korshunova et al. (2025), genera within the family Flabellinopsidae include:

- Baenopsis Korshunova, Martynov, Bakken, Evertsen, Fletcher, Mudianta, H. Saito, Lundin, Schrödl & Picton, 2017
- Flabellinopsis MacFarland, 1966

According to Ekimova et al. (2026), genera within the family Flabellinopsidae include:

- Baenopsis Korshunova, Martynov, Bakken, Evertsen, Fletcher, Mudianta, H. Saito, Lundin, Schrödl & Picton, 2017
- Bajaeolis Gosliner & Behrens, 1986 [placed in Facelinidae by Korshunova et al. (2025)]
- Flabellinopsis MacFarland, 1966
- Kynaria Korshunova, Martynov, Bakken, Evertsen, Fletcher, Mudianta, H. Saito, Lundin, Schrödl & Picton, 2017
