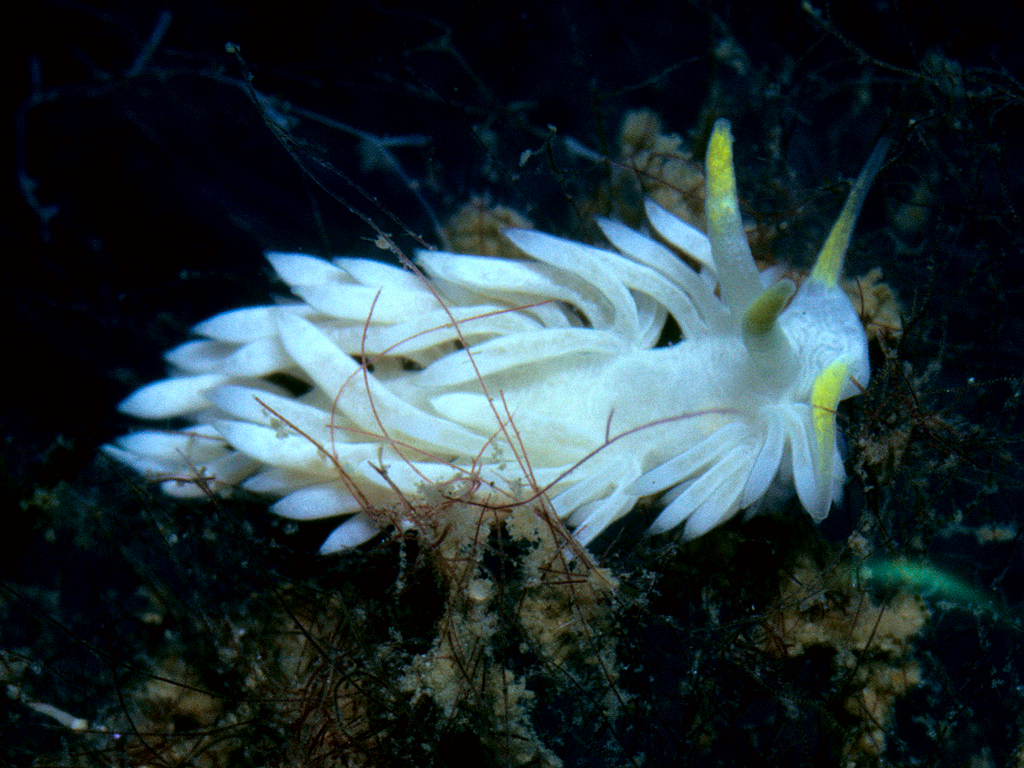
- The nudibranch, Dicata odhneri, Lough Hyne, Co. Cork, Ireland.

Scientific classification
- Kingdom: Animalia
- Phylum: Mollusca
- Class: Gastropoda
- Order: Nudibranchia
- Suborder: Aeolidacea
- Family: Facelinidae
- Genus: Dicata
- Species: D. odhneri

Binomial name
- Dicata odhneri Schmekel, 1967

= Dicata odhneri =

Species of gastropod

Dicata odhneri is a species of sea slug, specifically an aeolid nudibranch, a marine gastropod mollusc in the family Facelinidae.

== Distribution ==
This species was described from the Gulf of Naples, Italy. It has been reported from Atlantic Coasts of Europe as far north as Lough Hyne in southern Ireland.
