= Palisa (disambiguation) =

Palisa is a genus of sea slugs found in the Caribbean with only one species, namely Palisa papillata.

Palisa could also refer to:

- Johann Palisa (1848 – 1925), an Austrian astronomer
- Pavlo Palisa, who founded the 5th Assault Brigade (Ukraine) in May 2022
- Noludwe Palisa Aretha Wiggins, a candidate from the Eastern Cape of South Africa for the Inkatha Freedom Party; see Party lists for the 2019 South African election#Inkatha Freedom Party
- Palisa (crater), a specific crater on the Moon
