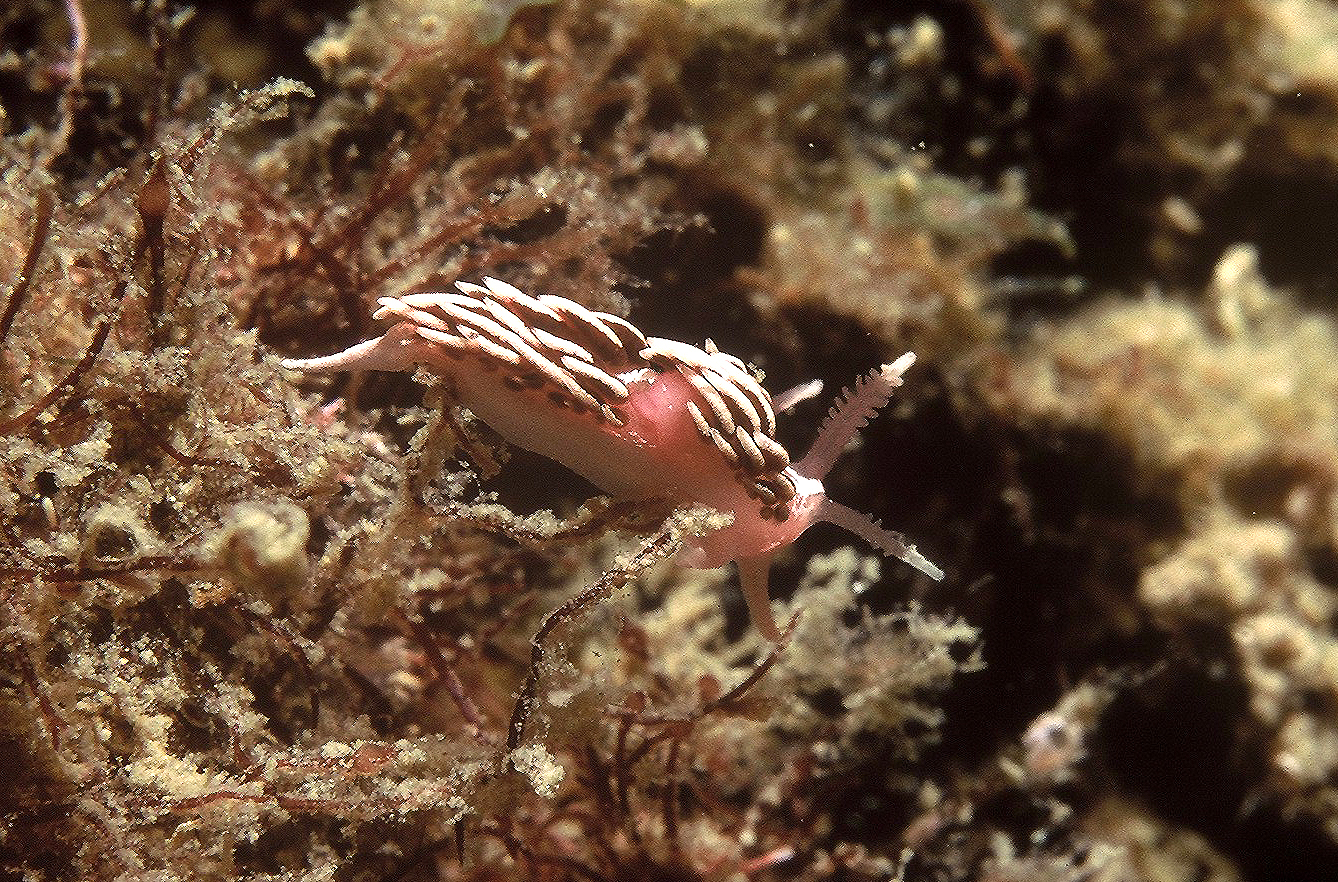

Scientific classification
- Kingdom: Animalia
- Phylum: Mollusca
- Class: Gastropoda
- Order: Nudibranchia
- Suborder: Aeolidacea
- Family: Facelinidae
- Genus: Facelinopsis
- Species: F. marioni

Binomial name
- Facelinopsis marioni (Vayssière, 1888)

Synonyms
- Facelina marioni Vayssière, 1888

= Facelinopsis marioni =

Species of gastropod

Facelinopsis marioni is a species of sea slug, an aeolid nudibranch, a marine gastropod mollusc in the family Facelinidae.

== Taxonomic History ==
Vayssière established the species under Facelina in 1888. In 1954, Pruvot-Fol created the genus Facelinopsis for the sole purpose of containing F. marioni, on the basis of lacking penile spines, and also the presence of a non-retractile specialized structure composed of small atrophied cerata without diverticulum attached to the penis, both characteristics anomalous amongst Facelina.

== Distribution ==
A Mediterranean species, F. marioni was described from the Rade de Villefranche-sur-Mer, France. With sightings frequent in Marseille and Banyuls-sur-Mer in addition to Villefranche, it seems to preside primarily within le golfe de Marseille, although, there have been sightings as far as the strait of Gibraltar.

== Description ==
The body is a translucent pink or purplish-pink. In the middle of the back there is a large opaque white band that starts between the rhinophores and ends at the tail tip. There may also be white spots congregating at portions of the dorsal stripe, or on the head that could lead to a discontinous line on the sides. Both the rhinophores and the oral tentacles are the same translucent pink of the body, tipped in opaque white pigment. The cerata are translucent pink but appear brown due to a diverticulum that nearly fills each cera. On each cerata's external face there is a stripe of opaque white pigment that begins usually just above the base, and continues to cover the tip.

The foot is a bit larger than the body and becomes wider at the front, with foot corners so rounded they can hardly be called corners. The oral tentacles are rather long and only somewhat robust.The rhinophores have 7-8 oblique lamellae, but lamellae may be absent in juveniles. The cerata, thick and somewhat short in the context of Facelinids, form 4 groups on either side of the animal, with the separataion between the first and second group being the most distinct. Between the first and second ceratal group on the right side of the animal is the penial sheet, with two small papillae on either side. It is this genital structure that Pruvot-Fol based the founding of Facelinopsis upon. The penial sheet may be absent in juveniles.

The typical adult size of this species is 10 mm.
