= Anetarca piutaensis =

Scientific classification
- Kingdom: Animalia
- Phylum: Mollusca
- Class: Gastropoda
- Order: Nudibranchia
- Suborder: Aeolidacea
- Family: Facelinidae
- Genus: Anetarca
- Species: A. piutaensis

Binomial name
- Anetarca piutaensis (Ortea, Caballer & Espinosa, 2003)

Synonyms
- Cratena piutaensis Ortea, Caballer & Espinosa, 2003

Species of gastropod

Anetarca piutaensis is a species of sea slug, specifically an aeolid nudibranch. It is a marine gastropod mollusc in the family Facelinidae.

== Distribution ==
This species was described from Punta Piuta, Limón Province, on the Caribbean Sea coast of Costa Rica.
