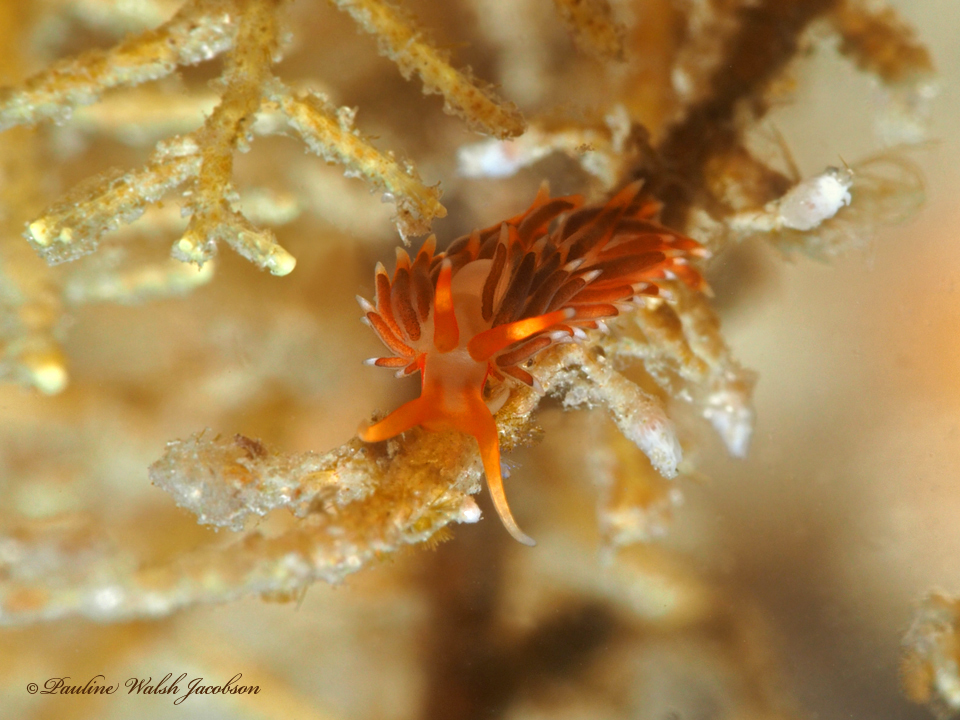

Scientific classification
- Kingdom: Animalia
- Phylum: Mollusca
- Class: Gastropoda
- Order: Nudibranchia
- Suborder: Aeolidacea
- Family: Facelinidae
- Genus: Learchis
- Species: L. evelinae

Binomial name
- Learchis evelinae Edmunds & Just, 1983

= Learchis evelinae =

Species of gastropod

Learchis evelinae is a species of sea slug, specifically an aeolid nudibranch. It is a marine gastropod mollusc in the family Facelinidae.

== Distribution ==
This species was described from 1 m depth on the reef-flat outside the Bellairs Research Institute, Barbados. It has been reported from Florida.
