= Echinopsole fulvus =

Scientific classification
- Kingdom: Animalia
- Phylum: Mollusca
- Class: Gastropoda
- Order: Nudibranchia
- Suborder: Aeolidacea
- Family: Facelinidae
- Genus: Echinopsole
- Species: E. fulvus

Binomial name
- Echinopsole fulvus Macnae, 1954

Species of gastropod

Echinopsole fulvus is a species of sea slug, an aeolid nudibranch, a marine gastropod mollusc in the family Facelinidae.

== Distribution ==
This species was described from Dalebrook, False Bay, South Africa.
