= H. exigua =

H. exigua may refer to:

- Haematobia exigua, a true fly
- Haliotis exigua, an ear shell
- Haminoea exigua, a bubble snail
- Herviella exigua, a sea slug
- Hogna exigua, a wolf spider
- Hydractinia exigua, an athecate hydroid
