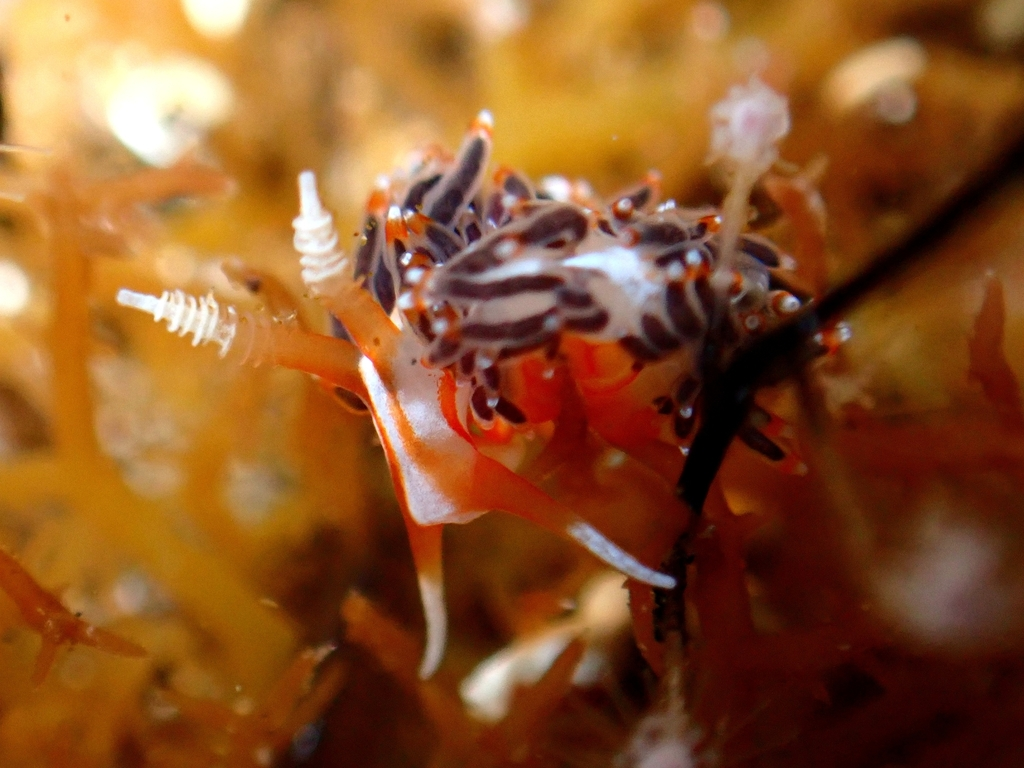

Scientific classification
- Kingdom: Animalia
- Phylum: Mollusca
- Class: Gastropoda
- Order: Nudibranchia
- Suborder: Aeolidacea
- Family: Facelinidae
- Genus: Learchis
- Species: L. poica

Binomial name
- Learchis poica Ev. Marcus & Er. Marcus, 1960

= Learchis poica =

Species of gastropod

Learchis poica is a species of sea slug, specifically an aeolid nudibranch. It is a marine gastropod mollusc in the family Facelinidae.

== Distribution ==
This species was described from the East coast of Virginia Key, Miami, Florida. It has been reported from Jamaica, the Bahamas, Barbados and Ghana.
