= Echinopsole breviceratae =

Scientific classification
- Kingdom: Animalia
- Phylum: Mollusca
- Class: Gastropoda
- Order: Nudibranchia
- Suborder: Aeolidacea
- Family: Facelinidae
- Genus: Echinopsole
- Species: E. breviceratae

Binomial name
- Echinopsole breviceratae Burn, 1962

Species of gastropod

Echinopsole breviceratae is a species of sea slug, an aeolid nudibranch, a marine gastropod mollusc in the family Facelinidae.

== Distribution ==
This species was described from Torquay, Victoria, Australia. It is endemic to southern Australia.
