= Herviella claror =

Scientific classification
- Kingdom: Animalia
- Phylum: Mollusca
- Class: Gastropoda
- Order: Nudibranchia
- Suborder: Aeolidacea
- Family: Facelinidae
- Genus: Herviella
- Species: H. claror

Binomial name
- Herviella claror Burn, 1963

Species of gastropod

Herviella claror is a species of sea slug, specifically an aeolid nudibranch, a marine gastropod mollusc belonging to the family Facelinidae. This species is native to Australia.
