= Antonietta luteorufa =

Scientific classification
- Kingdom: Animalia
- Phylum: Mollusca
- Class: Gastropoda
- Order: Nudibranchia
- Suborder: Aeolidacea
- Family: Facelinidae
- Genus: Antonietta
- Species: A. luteorufa

Binomial name
- Antonietta luteorufa Schmekel, 1966

Species of gastropod

Antonietta luteorufa is a species of sea slug or aeolid nudibranch, a marine gastropod mollusc in the family Facelinidae.

== Distribution ==
This nudibranch is known from the Gulf of Naples, Italy.
