= Solar-powered sea slugs =

Solar-powered sea slugs may refer to two groups of marine opisthobranch gastropods that are able to use photosynthesis as a supplementary nutritional source:

- Sacoglossa, which incorporate functioning chloroplasts into their tissues using kleptoplasty
- Species of aeolid nudibranchs in the genera Phyllodesmium and Pteraeolidia, which incorporate living zooxanthellae in their tissues
