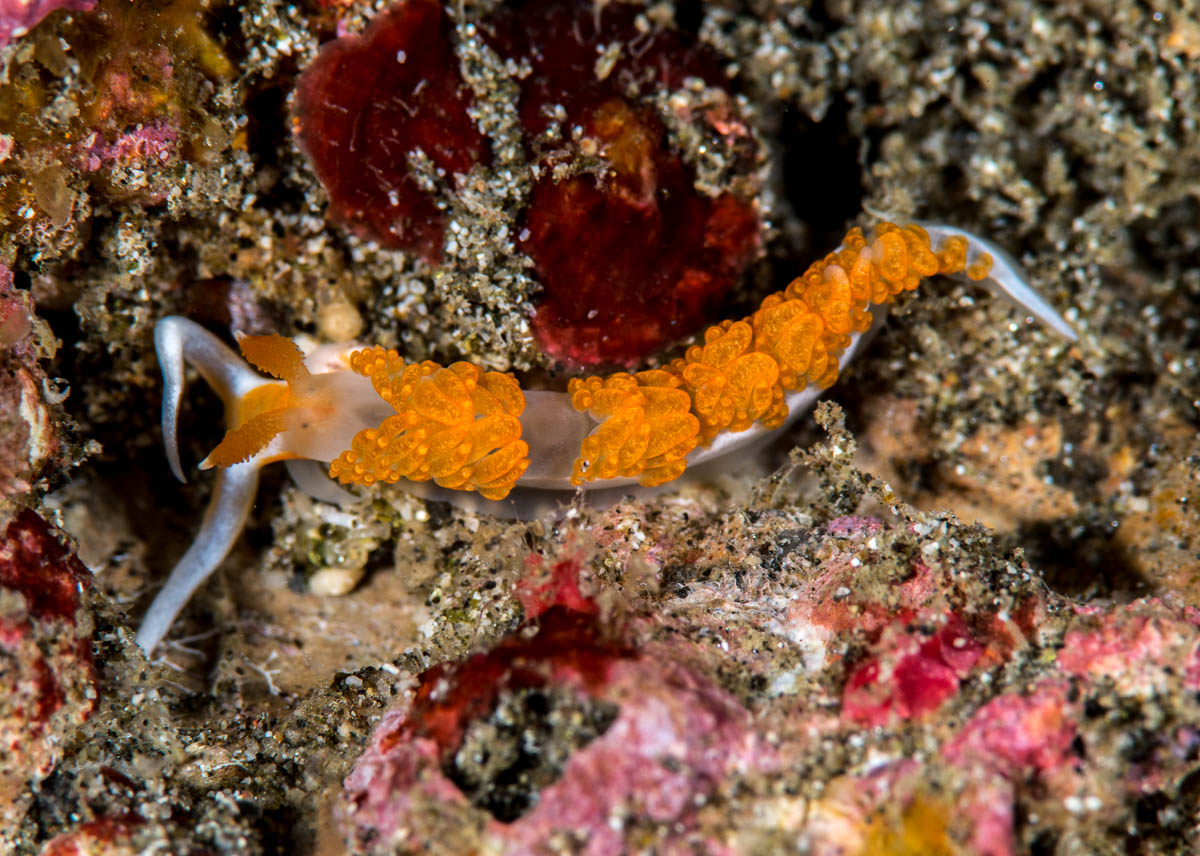
- The nudibranch Moridilla brockii, Padangbai, Bali, Indonesia

Scientific classification
- Kingdom: Animalia
- Phylum: Mollusca
- Class: Gastropoda
- Order: Nudibranchia
- Suborder: Aeolidacea
- Family: Facelinidae
- Genus: Moridilla
- Species: M. brockii

Binomial name
- Moridilla brockii Bergh, 1888

= Moridilla brockii =

Species of gastropod

Moridilla brockii is a species of sea slug, an aeolid nudibranch, a marine gastropod mollusc in the family Facelinidae.

== Distribution ==
The type locality of Moridilla brockii is the Sunda Sea which is an old name for the Flores Sea. This species is considered to be widespread in the Indo-Pacific region. It was redescribed from the Gulf of Mannar, India.
