= Herviella evelinae =

Scientific classification
- Kingdom: Animalia
- Phylum: Mollusca
- Class: Gastropoda
- Order: Nudibranchia
- Suborder: Aeolidacea
- Family: Facelinidae
- Genus: Herviella
- Species: H. evelinae

Binomial name
- Herviella evelinae (Er. Marcus, 1965)

Synonyms
- Muessa evelinae Er. Marcus, 1965

Species of gastropod

Herviella evelinae is a species of sea slug, an aeolid nudibranch, a marine gastropod mollusc in the family Facelinidae.

== Distribution ==
This species was described from the Caroline Islands.
