= Learchis ignis =

Scientific classification
- Kingdom: Animalia
- Phylum: Mollusca
- Class: Gastropoda
- Order: Nudibranchia
- Suborder: Aeolidacea
- Family: Facelinidae
- Genus: Learchis
- Species: L. ignis

Binomial name
- Learchis ignis Crescini, De Sisto & Villalba, 2013

Species of gastropod

Learchis ignis is a species of sea slug, specifically an aeolid nudibranch. It is a marine gastropod mollusc in the family Facelinidae.

== Distribution ==
This species was described from Bay of Charagato (10°50′26.57″N 64°09′33.20″W), northeast of Cubagua Island, Venezuela.
