= Herviella burchi =

Scientific classification
- Kingdom: Animalia
- Phylum: Mollusca
- Class: Gastropoda
- Order: Nudibranchia
- Suborder: Aeolidacea
- Family: Facelinidae
- Genus: Herviella
- Species: H. burchi

Binomial name
- Herviella burchi Burn, 1967

Species of gastropod

Herviella burchi is a species of sea slug, an aeolid nudibranch, a marine gastropod mollusc in the family Facelinidae.

== Distribution ==
This species was described from Australia.
