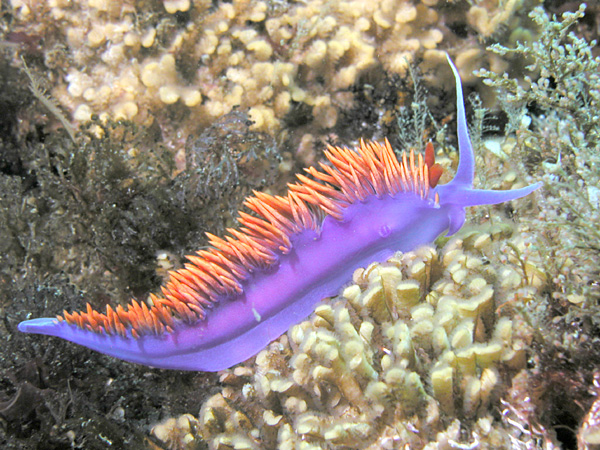
- Flabellinopsis iodinea in the Channel Islands of California

Scientific classification
- Kingdom: Animalia
- Phylum: Mollusca
- Class: Gastropoda
- Order: Nudibranchia
- Suborder: Aeolidacea
- Family: Flabellinopsidae
- Genus: Flabellinopsis; MacFarland, 1966

Type species
- Flabellinopsis iodinea (J. G. Cooper, 1863)

= Flabellinopsis =

Genus of gastropods

Flabellinopsis is a genus of sea slugs, aeolid nudibranchs, marine gastropod mollusks in the family Flabellinopsidae.

== Species ==
The following species are within the genus Flabellinopsis:

- Flabellinopsis iodinea (J. G. Cooper, 1863)
