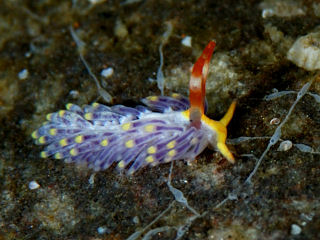
- Antonietta janthina

Scientific classification
- Kingdom: Animalia
- Phylum: Mollusca
- Class: Gastropoda
- Order: Nudibranchia
- Suborder: Aeolidacea
- Family: Facelinidae
- Genus: Antonietta; Schmekel 1966

= Antonietta (gastropod) =

Genus of gastropods

Antonietta is a genus of colorful sea slugs, aeolid nudibranchs, shell-less marine gastropod molluscs in the taxonomic family Facelinidae.

== Species ==
Species within this genus include:

- Antonietta janthina Baba & Hamatani, 1977
- Antonietta luteorufa Schmekel, 1966
