= Echinopsole =

Scientific classification
- Kingdom: Animalia
- Phylum: Mollusca
- Class: Gastropoda
- Order: Nudibranchia
- Suborder: Aeolidacea
- Family: Facelinidae
- Genus: Echinopsole; Macnae, 1954

Type species
- Echinopsole fulvus Macnae, 1954

Genus of gastropods

Echinopsole is a genus of sea slugs, specifically of aeolid nudibranchs, marine gastropod molluscs in the family Facelinidae.

== Species ==
Species in this genus include:

- Echinopsole breviceratae Burn, 1962
- Echinopsole fulvus Macnae, 1954
