= Anetarca =

Scientific classification
- Kingdom: Animalia
- Phylum: Mollusca
- Class: Gastropoda
- Order: Nudibranchia
- Suborder: Aeolidacea
- Family: Facelinidae
- Genus: Anetarca; Gosliner, 1991

Type species
- Anetarca armata Gosliner, 1991

Genus of gastropods

Anetarca is a genus of sea slugs, specifically of aeolid nudibranchs.

== Species ==
Species in this genus include:

- Anetarca armata Gosliner, 1991
- Anetarca brasiliana García & Troncoso, 2004
- Anetarca piutaensis (Ortea, Caballer & Espinosa, 2003)
