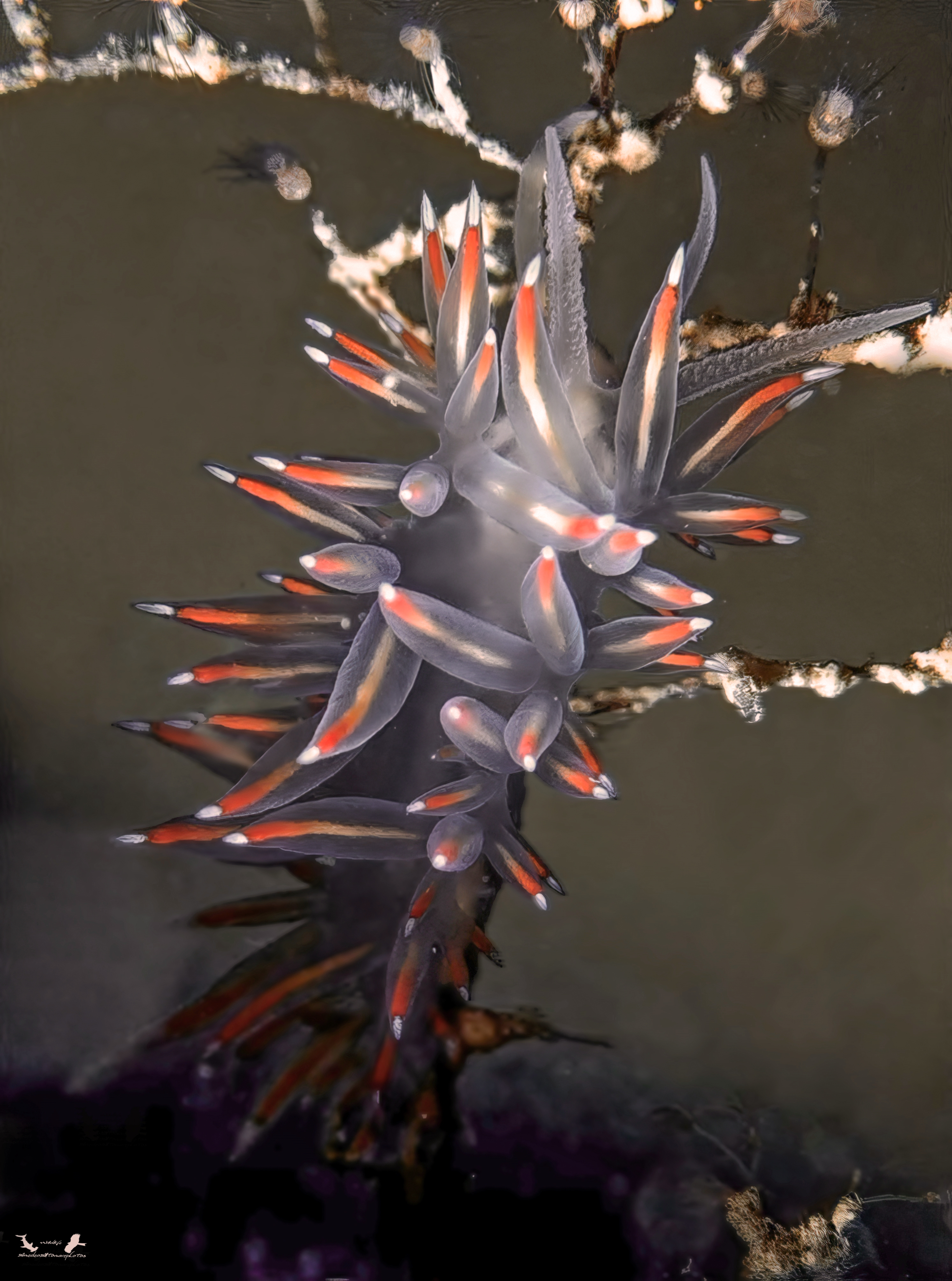

Scientific classification
- Kingdom: Animalia
- Phylum: Mollusca
- Class: Gastropoda
- Order: Nudibranchia
- Suborder: Aeolidacea
- Family: Flabellinopsidae
- Genus: Baenopsis
- Species: B. baetica

Binomial name
- Baenopsis baetica Garcia-Gomez, 1984

= Baenopsis baetica =

Species of gastropod

Baenopsis baetica is a species of sea slug, an aeolid nudibranch, a marine gastropod mollusc in the family Flabellinopsidae.

== Distribution ==
This species is known only from the Strait of Gibraltar.
