= Learchis =

- Learchis evelinae

Scientific classification
- Kingdom: Animalia
- Phylum: Mollusca
- Class: Gastropoda
- Order: Nudibranchia
- Suborder: Aeolidacea
- Family: Facelinidae
- Genus: Learchis; Bergh, 1896

Type species
- Learchis indica Bergh, 1896

Genus of gastropods

Learchis is a genus of sea slugs, specifically of aeolid nudibranchs, in the family Facelinidae.

== Species ==
Species in this genus include:

- Learchis evelinae Edmunds & Just, 1983
- Learchis ignis Crescini, De Sisto & Villalba, 2013
- Learchis poica Ev. Marcus & Er. Marcus, 1960

Species brought into synonymy:

- Learchis indica Bergh, 1896: synonym of Caloria indica (Bergh, 1896) - type species of Learchis

== Validity of the genus ==
According to Article 42.3. of the International Code of Zoological Nomenclature which states:

Application of genus-group names. The application of each genus-group name is determined by reference to the type species of the nominal taxon that it denotes.

The species currently allocated here to Learchis should be moved with Learchis indica to the genus Caloria.

The type species has been within Caloria since at least 2005, and has continued to be acknowledged as the type species of Learchis as late as 2017, so it is unclear why there has been a lack of resolution on this matter.
