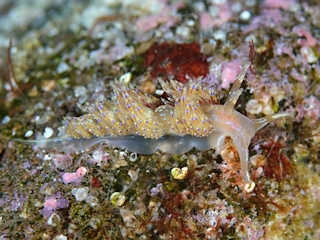

Scientific classification
- Kingdom: Animalia
- Phylum: Mollusca
- Class: Gastropoda
- Order: Nudibranchia
- Suborder: Aeolidacea
- Family: Facelinidae
- Genus: Setoeolis; Baba, 1965
- Species: S. inconspicua

Binomial name
- Setoeolis inconspicua (Baba, 1938)

Synonyms
- Cuthona (Hervia) inconspicua

= Setoeolis =

Species of gastropod

Setoeolis inconspicua is a species of sea slug, specifically an aeolid nudibranch. It is a marine gastropod mollusc in the family Facelinidae. It is the only species in the genus Setoeolis as identified by Baba & Hamatani, 1965.

== Distribution ==
The holotype of this species was found at Seto, Kii Province, Japan. It has been found at sites including Wakasa Bay on the Echizen coast and the Izu Peninsula.
