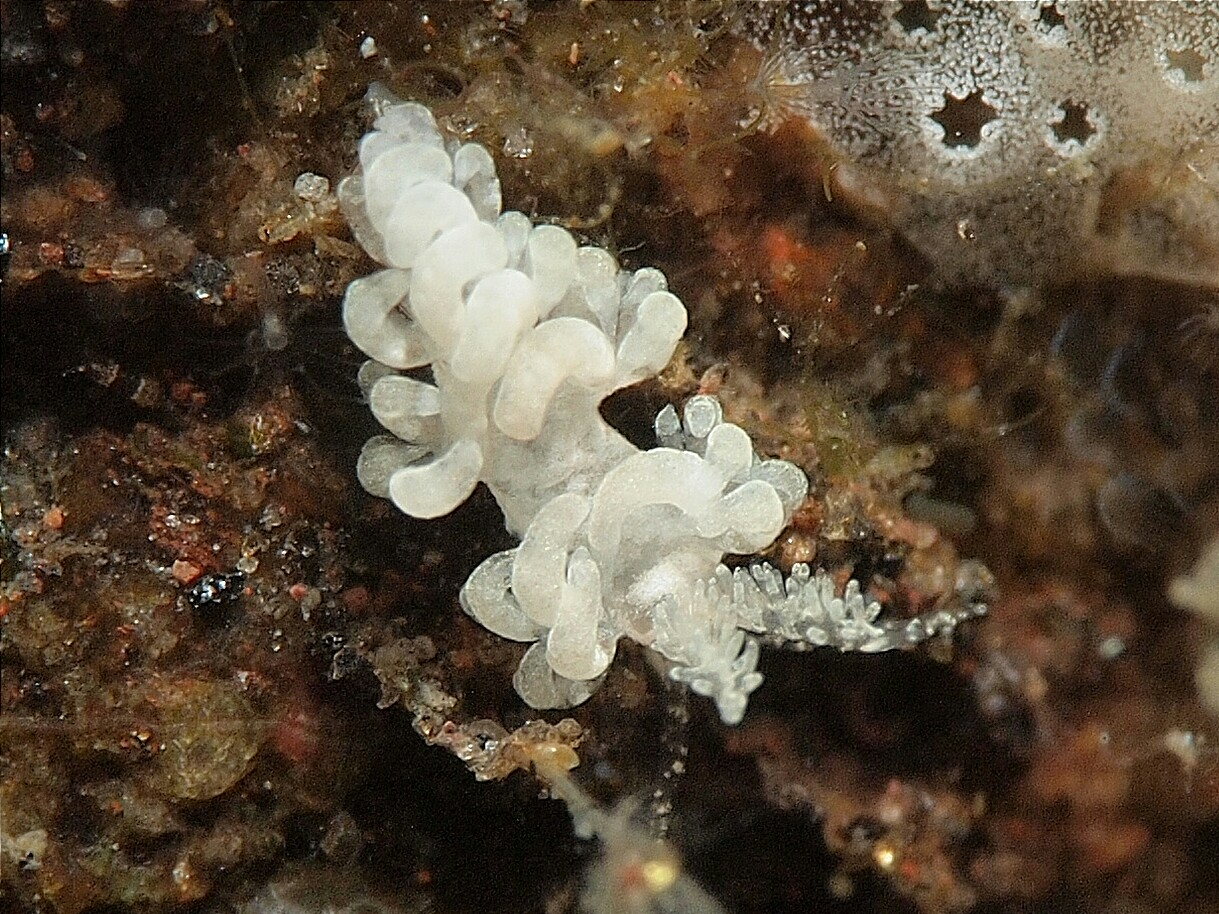
- Noumeaella sp.

Scientific classification
- Kingdom: Animalia
- Phylum: Mollusca
- Class: Gastropoda
- Order: Nudibranchia
- Suborder: Aeolidacea
- Family: Facelinidae
- Genus: Noumeaella; Risbec, 1937

= Noumeaella =

Genus of gastropods

Noumeaella is a genus of sea slugs, specifically of aeolid nudibranchs, in the family Facelinidae.

== Species ==
Species in this genus include:

- Noumeaella africana Edmunds, 1970
- Noumeaella curiosa Risbec, 1937
- Noumeaella isa Ev. Marcus & Er. Marcus, 1970
- Noumeaella kristenseni (Ev. Marcus & Er. Marcus, 1963)
- Noumeaella oviedo Ortea & Moro, 2022
- Noumeaella rehderi Marcus, 1965
- Noumeaella rubrofasciata Gosliner, 1991
Noumeaella kristenseni

Noumeaella rehderi

Noumeaella rubrofasciata
