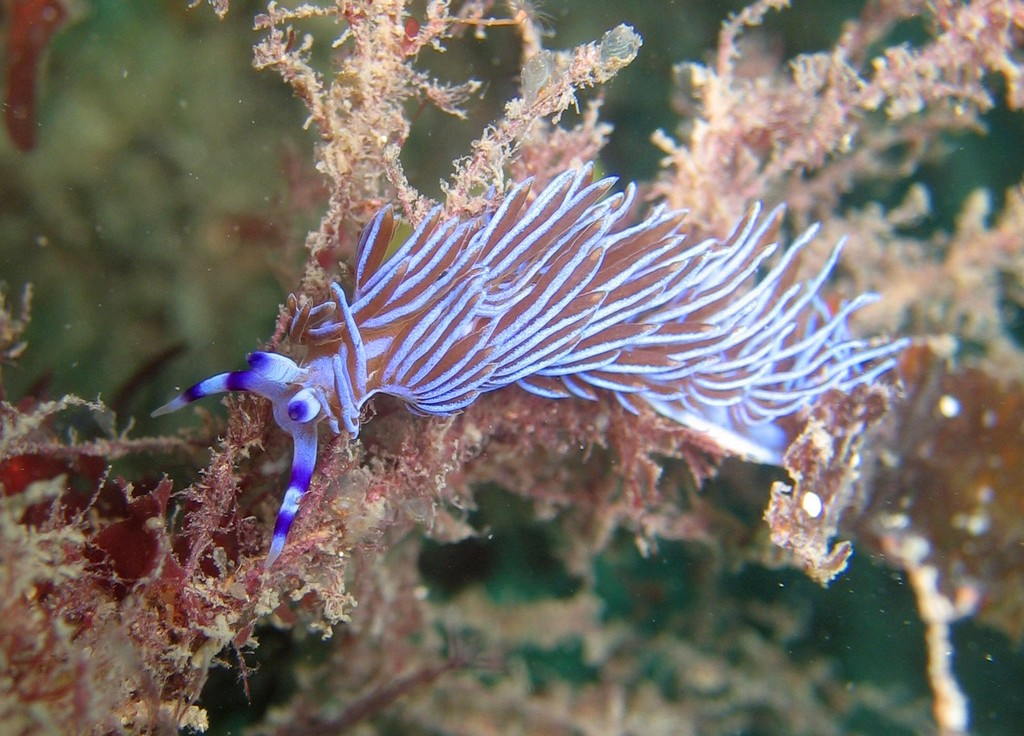

Scientific classification
- Kingdom: Animalia
- Phylum: Mollusca
- Class: Gastropoda
- Order: Nudibranchia
- Suborder: Aeolidacea
- Family: Facelinidae
- Genus: Pteraeolidia
- Species: P. ianthina

Binomial name
- Pteraeolidia ianthina (Angas, 1864)

Synonyms
- Flabellina ianthina Angas, 1864 (basionym)

= Pteraeolidia ianthina =

Species of gastropod

Pteraeolidia ianthina is a sea slug, an aeolid nudibranch in the family Facelinidae. It is known as a blue dragon, a name it shares with Glaucus atlanticus and Glaucus marginatus.

== Distribution ==
This species was thought to be widespread throughout the Indo-Pacific, but recent research show that it only lives in the coastal waters of East Australia. There is another species in the genus Pteraeolidia, Pteraeolidia semperi, which is actually a complex of more than one species.

== Description ==
Pteraeolidia ianthina, one of the most common aeolids found, is often called a "blue dragon" by Eastern Australian divers because of its close resemblance to a Chinese dragon. It is one of the most common aeolid nudibranchs found in Eastern Australia and can inflict a painful sting to humans.

The body color of this species is translucent tan, but the cerata, which vary from dark purple to lavender to golden brown, give the nudibranch most of its distinct color.

The slug is elongated (up to 20 cm (7.9 in)) with many clusters of medium-large sized cerata along the length of the body. The cerata do not have any white markings away from the tip. The fat rhinophores are tipped in purple and the long oral tentacles have only 2 dark purple bands. The sides of the body may have purple or brown markings, but no vertical white bars or white spots. Any additional purple bands on the oral tentacles, and/or vertical white bar or spots indicate the animal is part of the Pteraeolidia semperi species complex. White markings on the dorsum are acceptable to a diagnosis of P. ianthina.

Algal zooxanthellae of the genus Symbiodinium derived from the food of these animals continue to photosynthesise inside the body and give rise to brown and pigments that underlay the natural dusty paleness of the animal. Individuals lacking an active zooxanthellate system will appear much paler as a whole. Symbiodinium, together with the nematocysts, are presumed to be derived from coelenterate prey. These Symbiodinium occur within vacuoles in host cells derived from the endoderm.

Young specimens, due to not having consumed much pigment-providing zooxanthellae in their short lives, are completely white (only tips of rhinophores and cephalic tentacles have purple pigment). They are also much shorter and have fewer cerata, thus are often mistaken for other nudibranch species.

== Symbiosis with dinoflagellates ==
This sea slug feeds on hydroids which contain Symbiodinium, microscopic zooxanthellae dinoflagellates that are photosynthetic. The microscopic Symbiodinium acquired from the hydroids are 'farmed' in the sea slug's digestive diverticula, where the Symbiodinium photosynthesizes sugars to be used by the slug. The slug gains enough photosythetically derived sugars to sustain it without feeding.

== Gallery ==
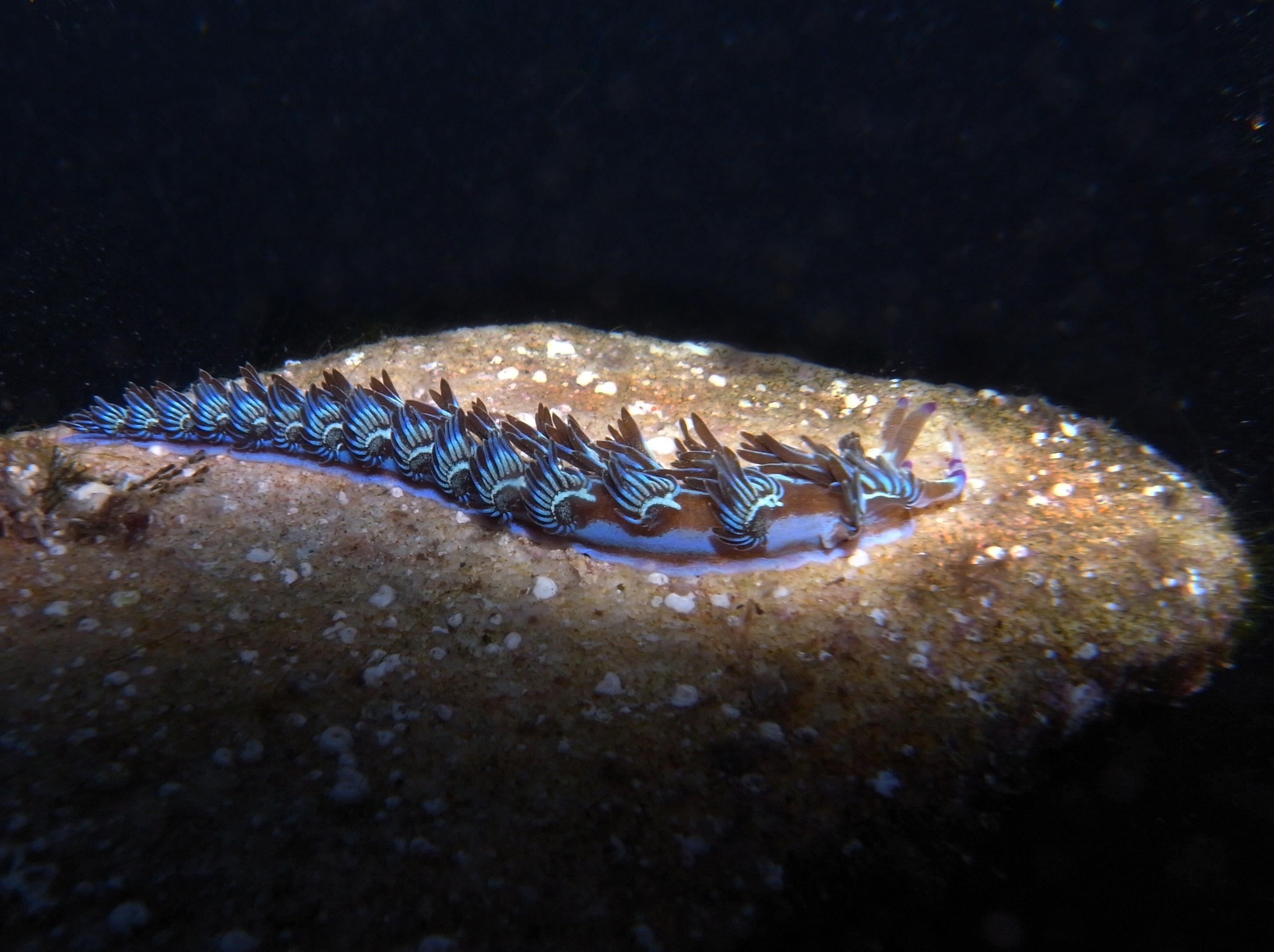
Sydney, Australia

Sydney, Australia

New South Wales, Australia

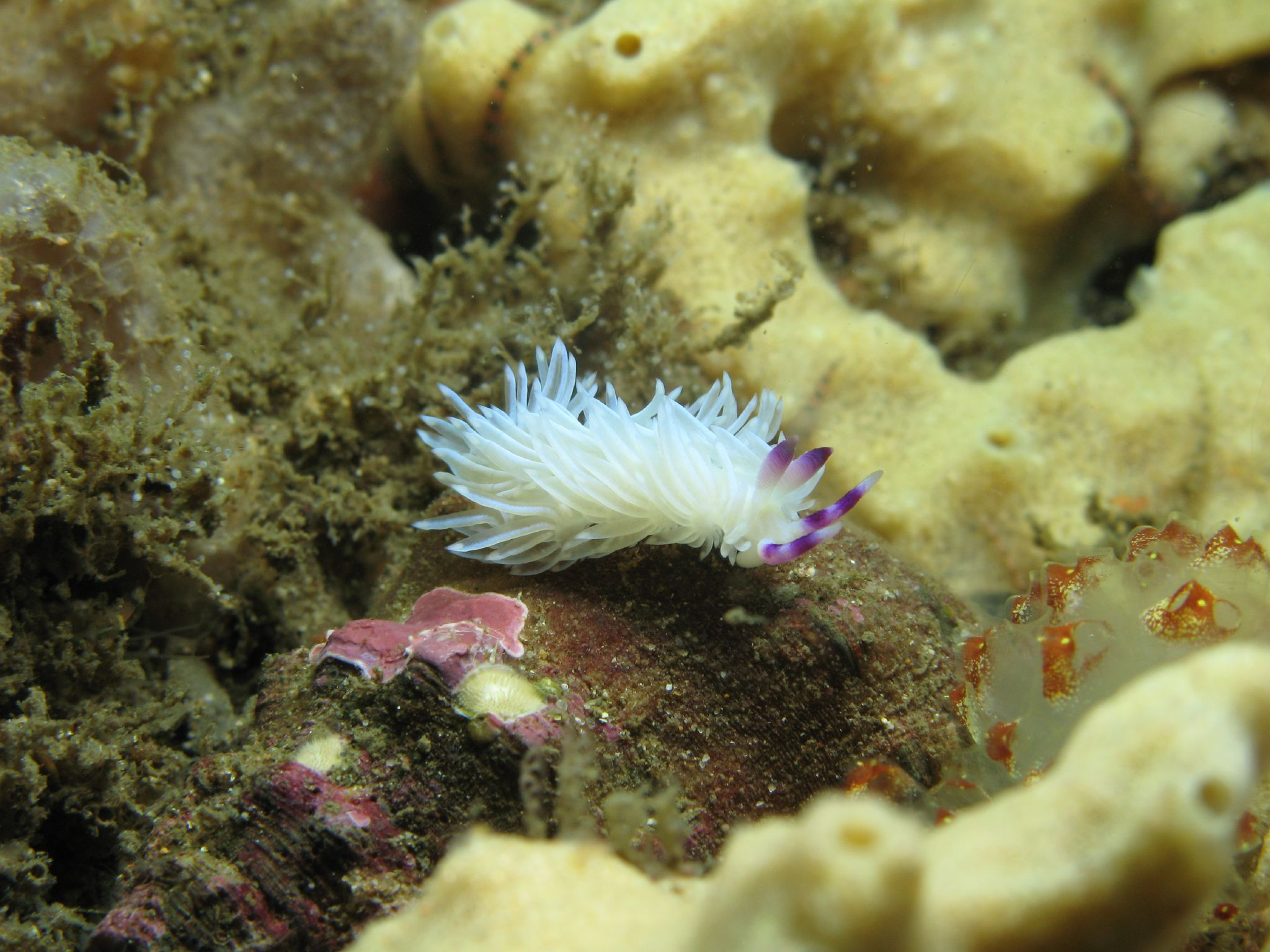
A juvenile without a zooxanthellate colony to provide pigment.

The cerata cores are brown, thick with symbiotic zooxanthanellae. Cnidosacs visible just at the tips.

Closeup of the perfoliate rhinophores.
