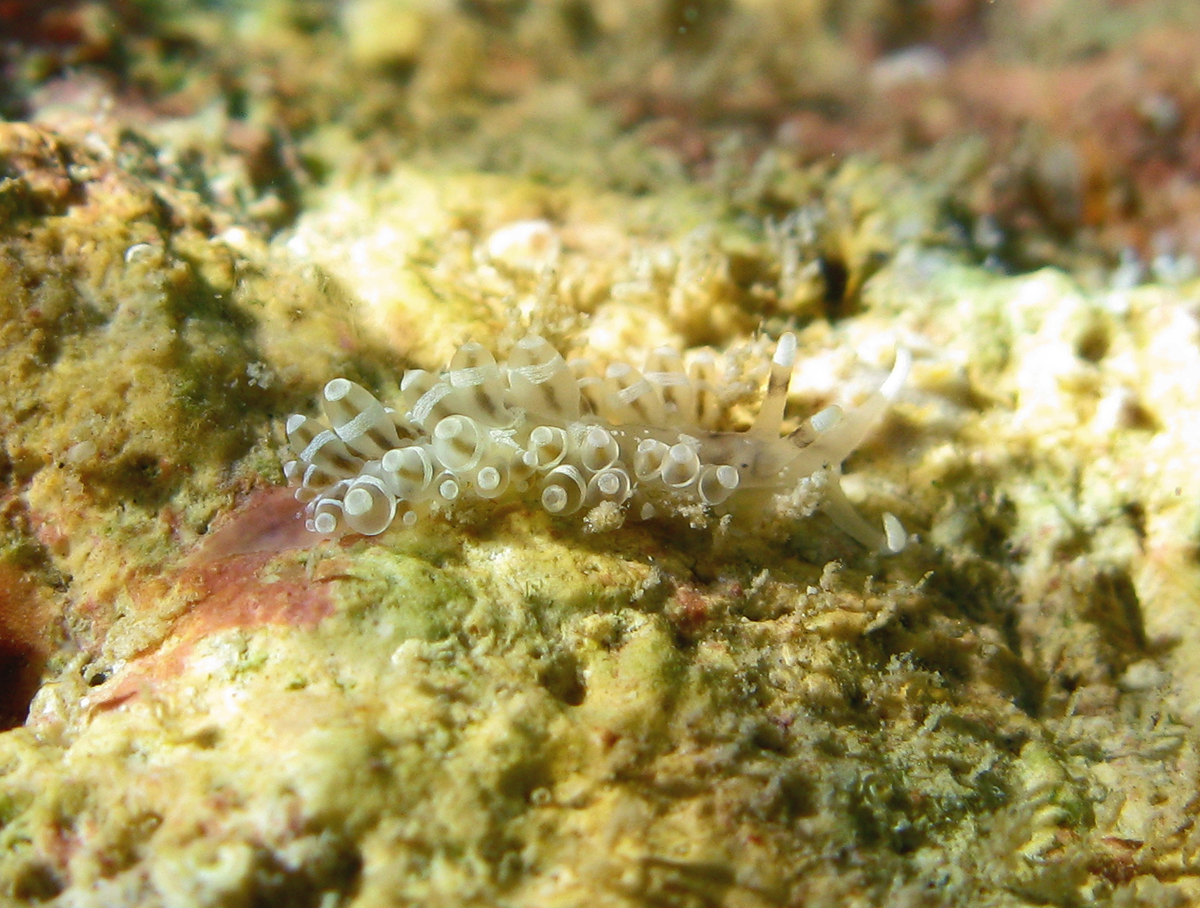
- A Herviella albida in Reunion.

Scientific classification
- Kingdom: Animalia
- Phylum: Mollusca
- Class: Gastropoda
- Order: Nudibranchia
- Suborder: Aeolidacea
- Family: Facelinidae
- Genus: Herviella; Baba, 1949

= Herviella =

Genus of gastropods

Herviella is a genus of small sea slugs, aolid nudibranchs, marine gastropod mollusks in the family Facelinidae.

== Species ==
Species within the genus Herviella include:

- Herviella affinis Baba, 1960
- Herviella africana Edmunds, 1970
- Herviella albida Baba, 1966
- Herviella burchi Burn, 1967
- Herviella claror Burn, 1963
- Herviella cloaca Rudman, 1980
- Herviella evelinae (Er. Marcus, 1965)
- Herviella exigua (Risbec, 1928)
- Herviella mietta Marcus & Burch, 1965
- Herviella yatsui (Baba, 1930)
