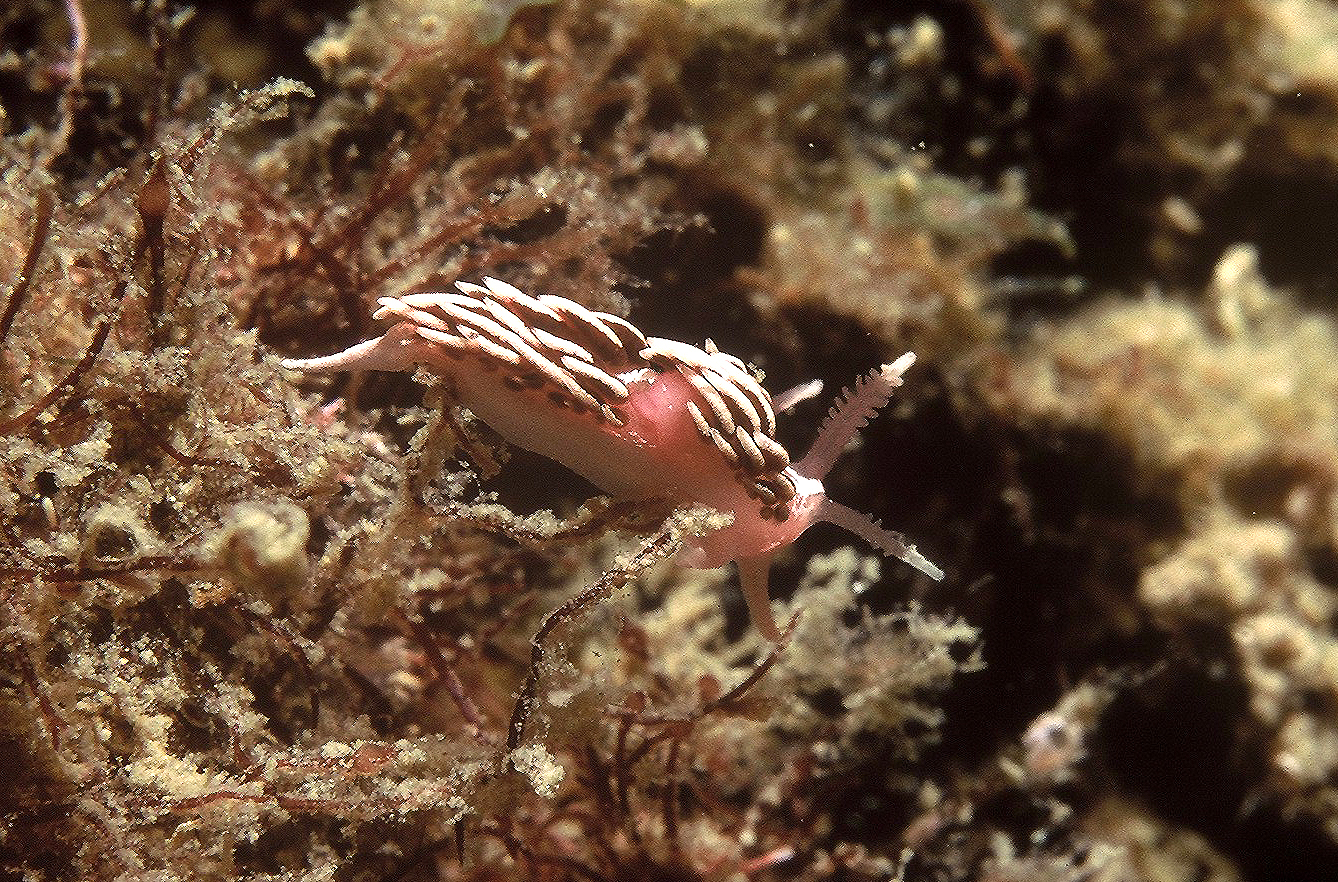
- Facelinopsis marioni

Scientific classification
- Kingdom: Animalia
- Phylum: Mollusca
- Class: Gastropoda
- Order: Nudibranchia
- Suborder: Aeolidacea
- Family: Facelinidae
- Genus: Facelinopsis; Pruvot-Fol, 1954

Type species
- Facelinopsis marioni (Vayssière, 1888)

Synonyms
- Facelinella Pruvot-Fol, 1951

= Facelinopsis =

Genus of gastropods

Facelinopsis is a genus of colorful sea slugs, aeolid nudibranchs. They are marine gastropod molluscs in the family Facelinidae.

== Taxonomic history ==
Pruvot-Fol established Facelinopsis specifically to contain the then-named Facelina marioni, on the basis of lacking penile spines, and also the presence of a non-retractile specialized structure composed of small atrophied cerata without diverticulum attached to the penis.

== Species ==
Species within Facelinopsis currently include:

- Facelinopsis marioni (Vayssière, 1888)
- Facelinopsis pacodelucia Ortea, Moro & Caballer, 2014
