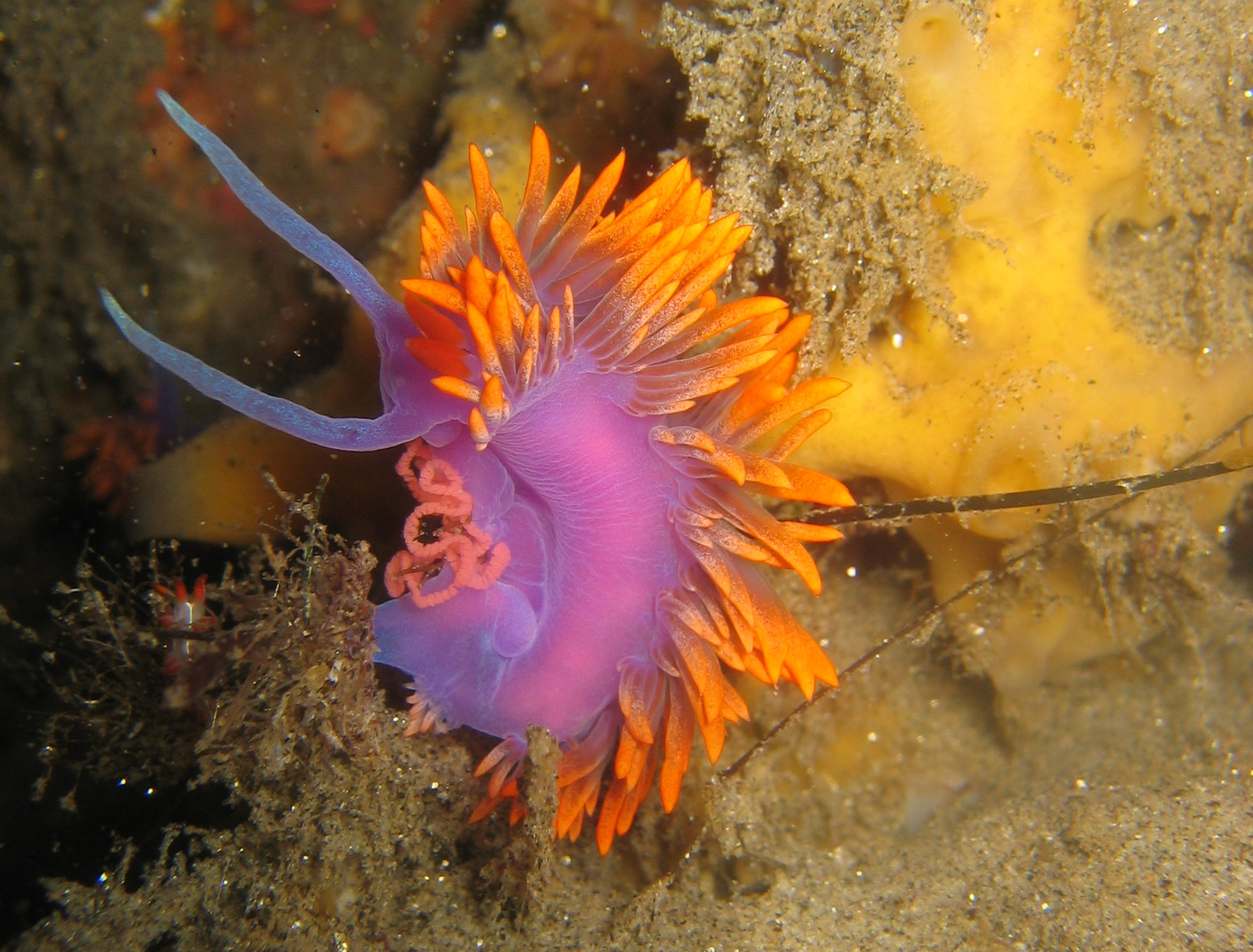

Scientific classification
- Kingdom: Animalia
- Phylum: Mollusca
- Class: Gastropoda
- Order: Nudibranchia
- Suborder: Aeolidacea
- Family: Flabellinopsidae
- Genus: Flabellinopsis
- Species: F. iodinea

Binomial name
- Flabellinopsis iodinea (Cooper, 1863)

Synonyms
- Aeolis iodinea J. G. Cooper, 1863

= Flabellinopsis iodinea =

Spanish shawl Flabellinopsis iodinea

Species of gastropod

Flabellinopsis iodinea, the Spanish shawl, is a species of aeolid nudibranch, a very colorful sea slug. This is a marine gastropod mollusk in the family Flabellinidae.

== Distribution ==
This species is native to the west coast of North America and further south. It has been reported as far north as British Columbia, Canada, and as far south as Punta Asunción, Baja California Sur, Mexico. It is also found in the Gulf of California and the Galapagos Islands.

It has been found off the coast of Santa Catalina Island, California, the Palos Verdes Peninsula and San Diego, California.

== Description ==
This nudibranch displays a stunning set of colors: the body is purple, the cerata are orange and the rhinophores are scarlet. The neon orange appendages on the back of Flabellinopsis iodinea are the cerata which extract oxygen from the sea water they are surrounded by and live in. The cerata are also extensions of the digestive system, and are used to store the stinging cells of the anemones and fan-like hydroids they eat. The red rhinophores are sensory structures used for detecting the presence of possible mates and prey. The purple, red, and orange colors are derived from a single carotenoid pigment, astaxanthin. The pigment appears in three modified states, leading to the three distinct colors. It grows to approx 70mm, and is found from the intertidal to approx. 40m deep.

Scientists think the reason why the Spanish Shawl's gills are orange is so they can camouflage with their prey while they are eating. The orange gills on their backs are also a warning to potential predators. The color tells their predators that they are either poisonous or distasteful.

== Life habits ==
Spanish shawls are hermaphrodites, which means they have both male and female reproductive organs. However, self-fertilisation very rarely occurs. When threatened by other predators, they can gracefully move away by flexing their body strongly and pushing off from the substrate and into midwater.

== Gallery ==
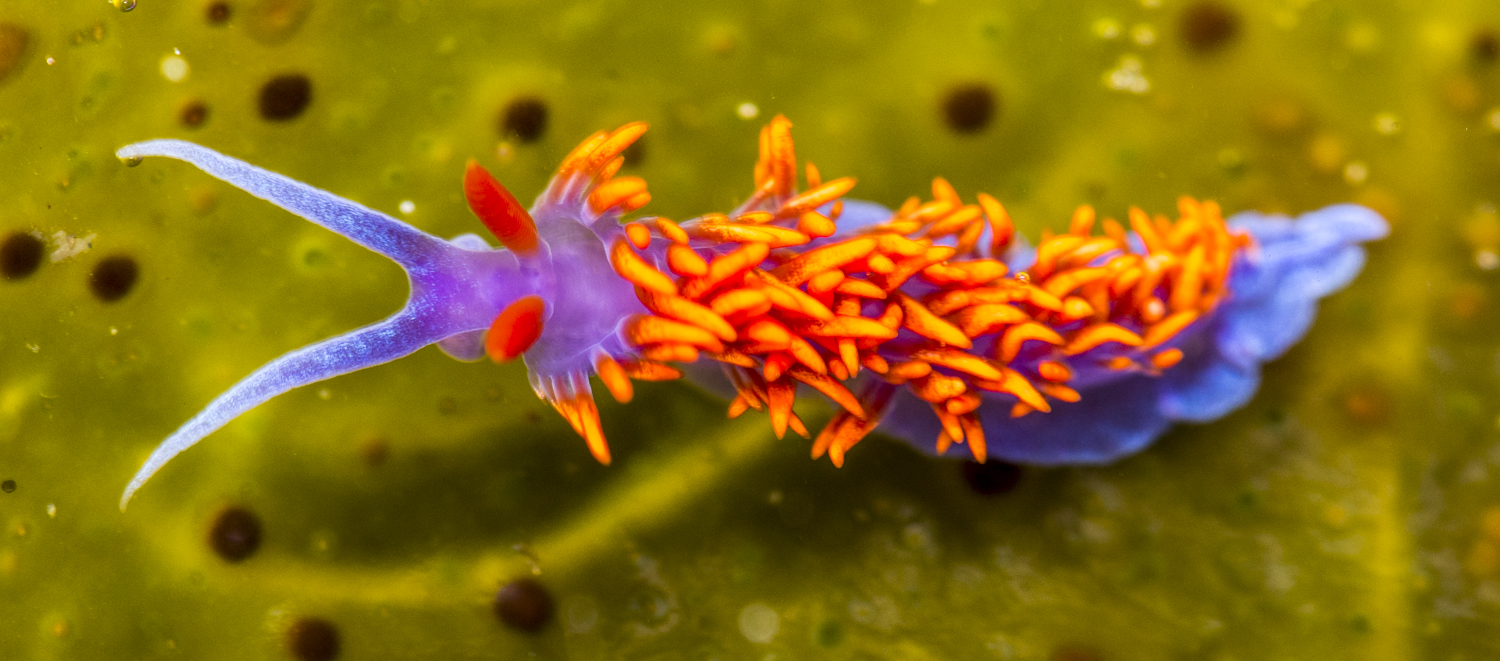
Spanish Shawl near Los Osos, California

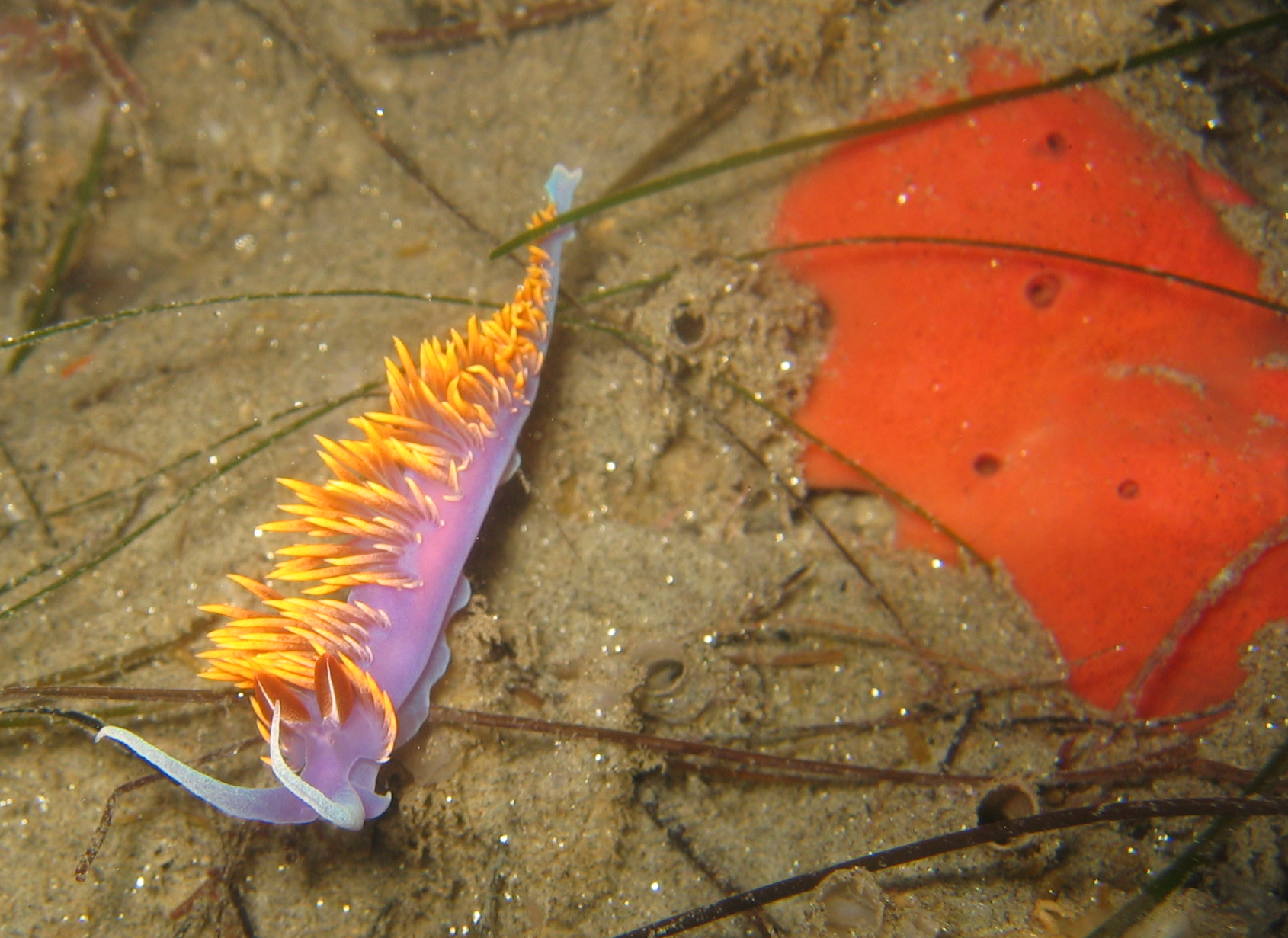
Spanish shawl in La Jolla, California

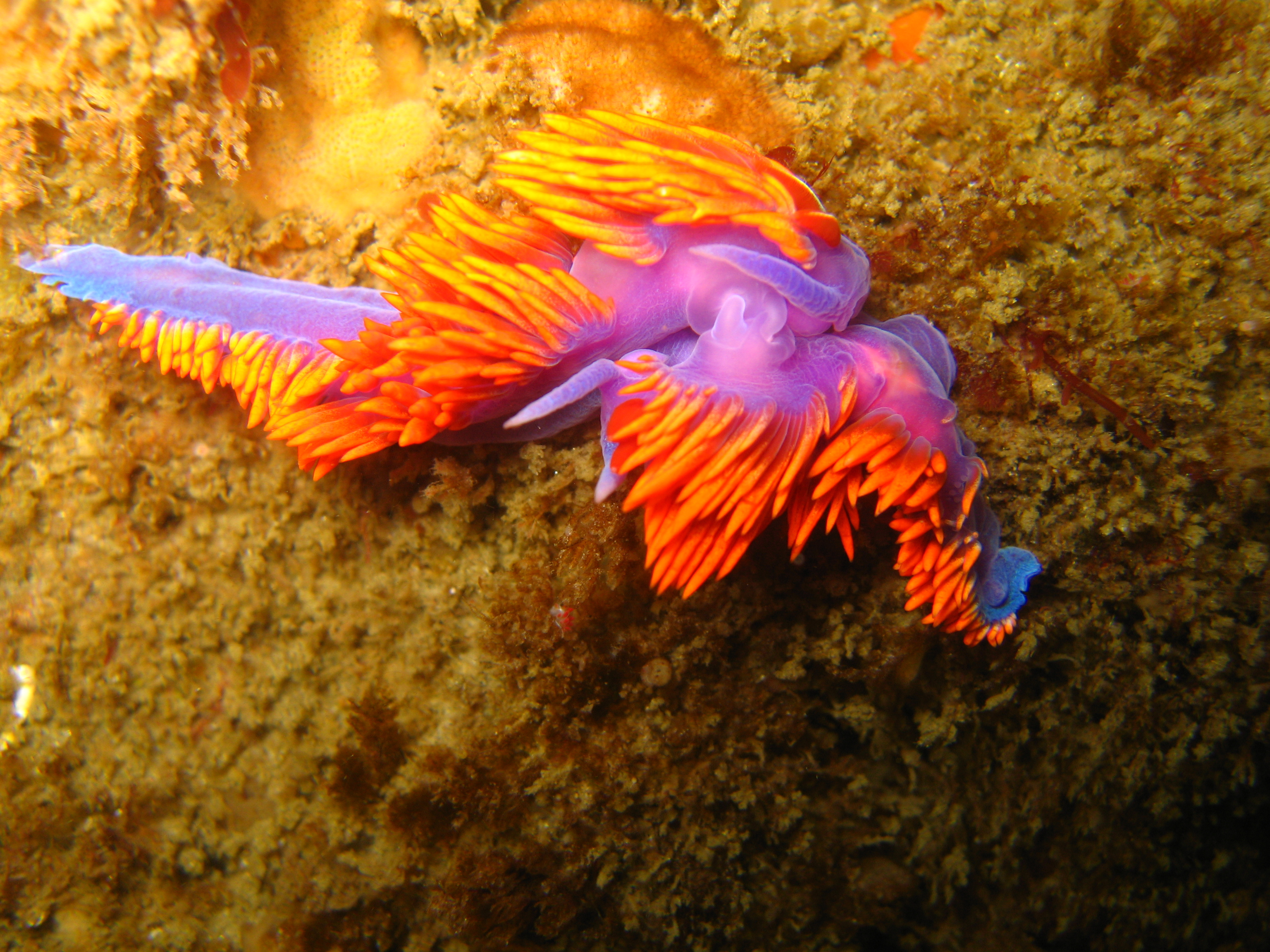
Spanish shawls mating in Malibu, California

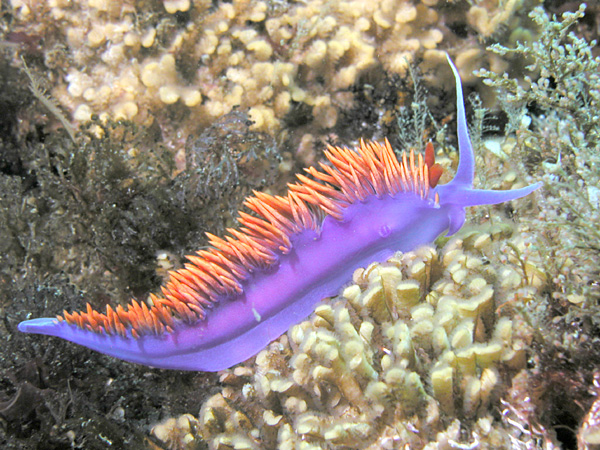
A Spanish shawl nudibranch in the Channel Islands of California.

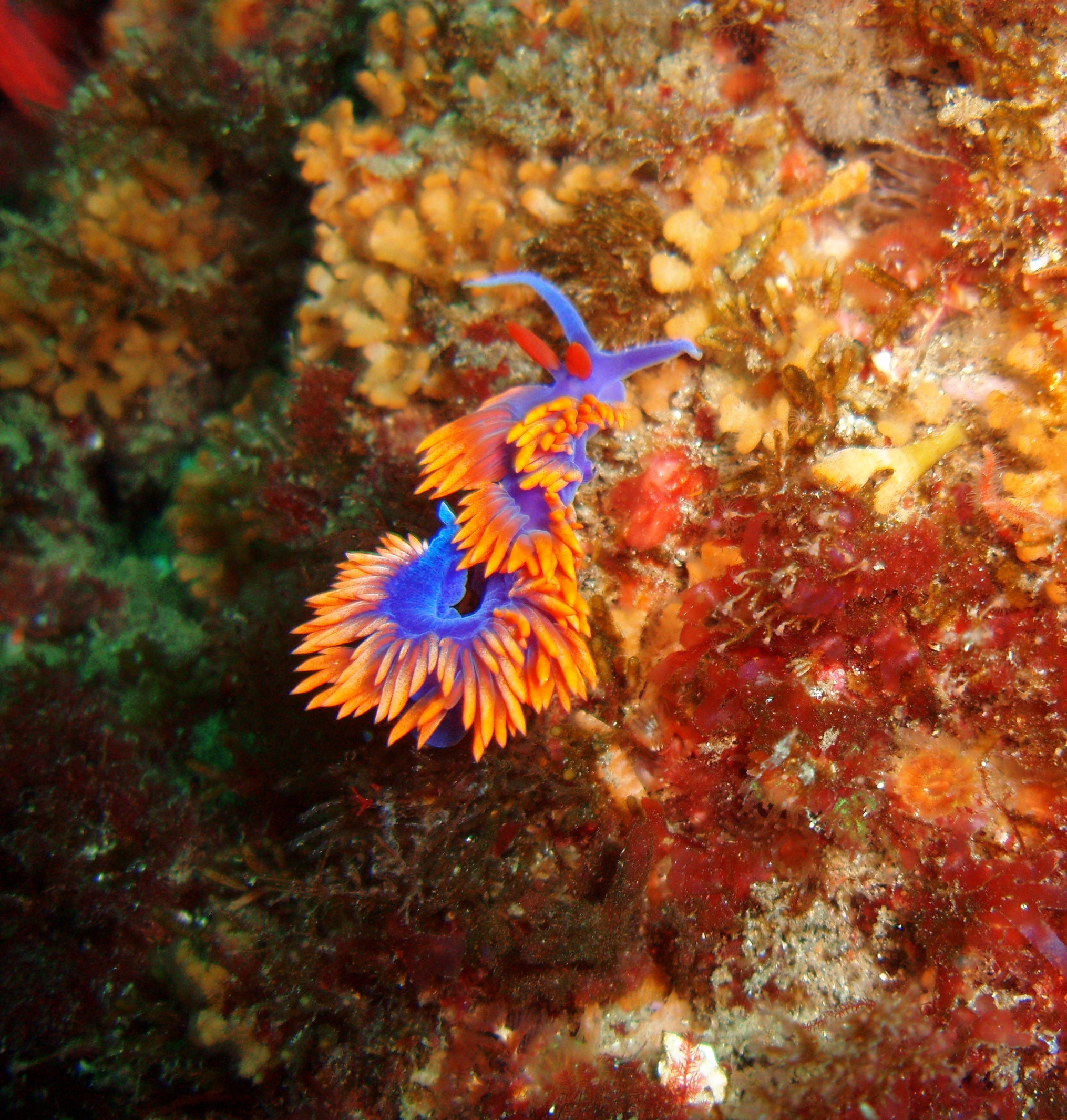
Spanish shawl in the Channel Islands National Marine Sanctuary
