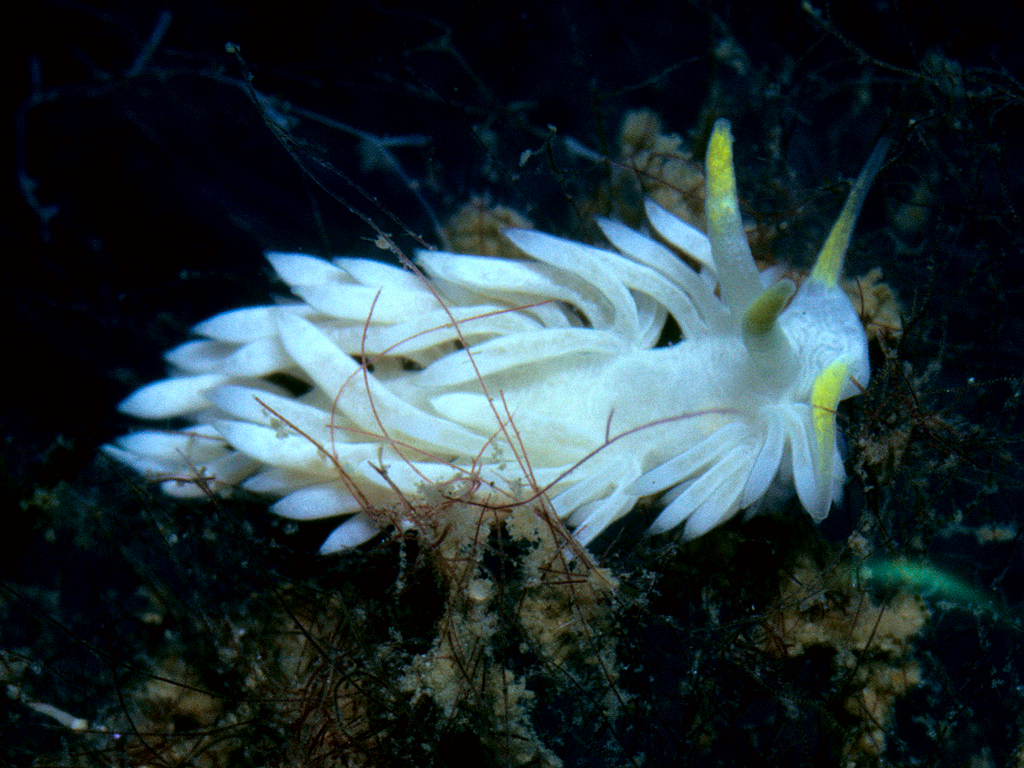
- The nudibranch, Dicata odhneri, Lough Hyne, Co. Cork, Ireland.

Scientific classification
- Kingdom: Animalia
- Phylum: Mollusca
- Class: Gastropoda
- Order: Nudibranchia
- Suborder: Aeolidacea
- Family: Facelinidae
- Genus: Dicata; Dicata Schmekel, 1967

= Dicata =

Genus of gastropods

Dicata is a genus of sea slugs, specifically of aeolid nudibranchs. Only one species is known to belong to this genus, a marine gastropod mollusc in the family Facelinidae.

== Species ==
Species in this genus include:

- Dicata odhneri Schmekel, 1967
