= Moridilla =

- Moridilla brockii

Scientific classification
- Kingdom: Animalia
- Phylum: Mollusca
- Class: Gastropoda
- Order: Nudibranchia
- Suborder: Aeolidacea
- Family: Facelinidae
- Genus: Moridilla; Bergh, 1888

Type species
- Moridilla brockii Bergh, 1888

Genus of gastropods

Moridilla is a genus of colorful sea slugs, aeolid nudibranchs. They are marine gastropod molluscs in the family Facelinidae.

== Species ==
Species within Moridilla include:

- Moridilla brockii Bergh, 1888
- Moridilla fifo Carmona & N. G. Wilson, 2018
- Moridilla hermanita Carmona & N. G. Wilson, 2018
- Moridilla jobeli Schillo & Wägele, 2019
- Moridilla maldivensis Fernández-Simón & Moles, 2023
Moridilla hermanita

Moridilla maldivensis

Species brought into synonymy include:

- Moridilla kristenseni Ev. Marcus & Er. Marcus, 1963: synonym of Noumeaella kristenseni (Ev. Marcus & Er. Marcus, 1963)
