= Algarvia alba =

Scientific classification
- Kingdom: Animalia
- Phylum: Mollusca
- Class: Gastropoda
- Order: Nudibranchia
- Suborder: Aeolidacea
- Family: Facelinidae
- Genus: Algarvia; García-Gómez & Cervera, 1990
- Species: A. alba

Binomial name
- Algarvia alba García-Gómez & Cervera, 1990

Species of gastropod

Algarvia alba is a species of sea slug, specifically an aeolid nudibranch. It is a marine gastropod mollusc in the family Facelinidae. It is the only species in the genus Algarvia.

== Distribution ==
This species was described from Sagres, Portugal 37°00′49″N 8°55′31″W. It has subsequently been recorded from Cantabria 43°18′34″N 2°11′52″W, on the North coast of Spain.

== Description ==
Algarvia alba is a small nudibranch, growing to 15 mm in length. It has a distinctive appearance, with a white body, white cerata and bright orange-red oral tentacles and rhinophores and an orange line across the front of the head.
