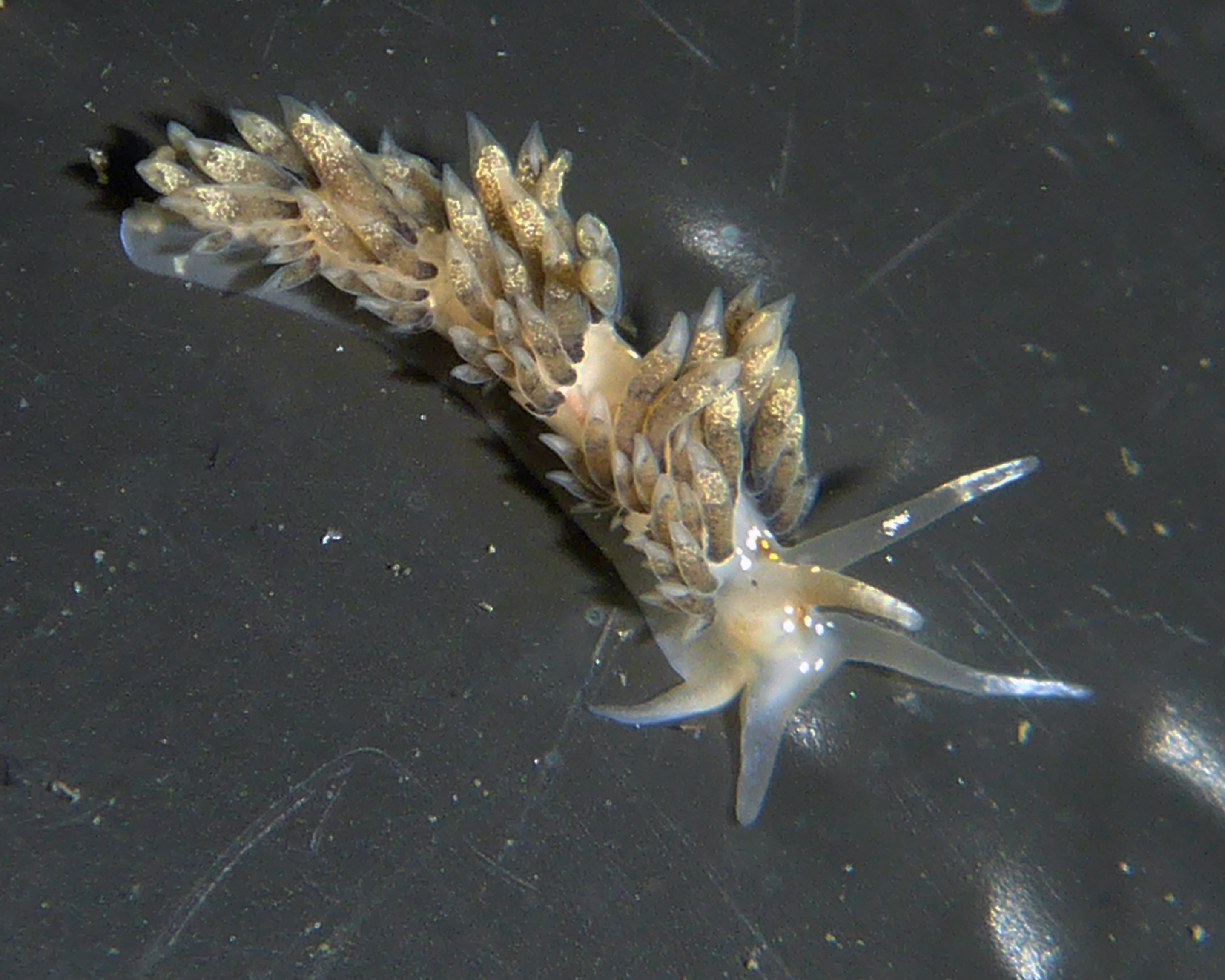
- Emarcusia morroensis from Santa Cruz, California

Scientific classification
- Kingdom: Animalia
- Phylum: Mollusca
- Class: Gastropoda
- Order: Nudibranchia
- Suborder: Aeolidacea
- Family: Facelinidae
- Genus: Emarcusia; Roller, 1972
- Species: E. morroensis

Binomial name
- Emarcusia morroensis Roller, 1972

= Emarcusia =

Species of gastropod

Emarcusia morroensis, the Morro Bay aeolid, is a species of sea slug, specifically an aeolid nudibranch. It is a marine gastropod mollusc in the family Facelinidae. It is the only species in the genus Emarcusia.

== Distribution ==
The holotype of this species was found at Morro Bay, San Luis Obispo County, California. It is found on the Californian coast from Fort Baker, Marin County to San Diego.
