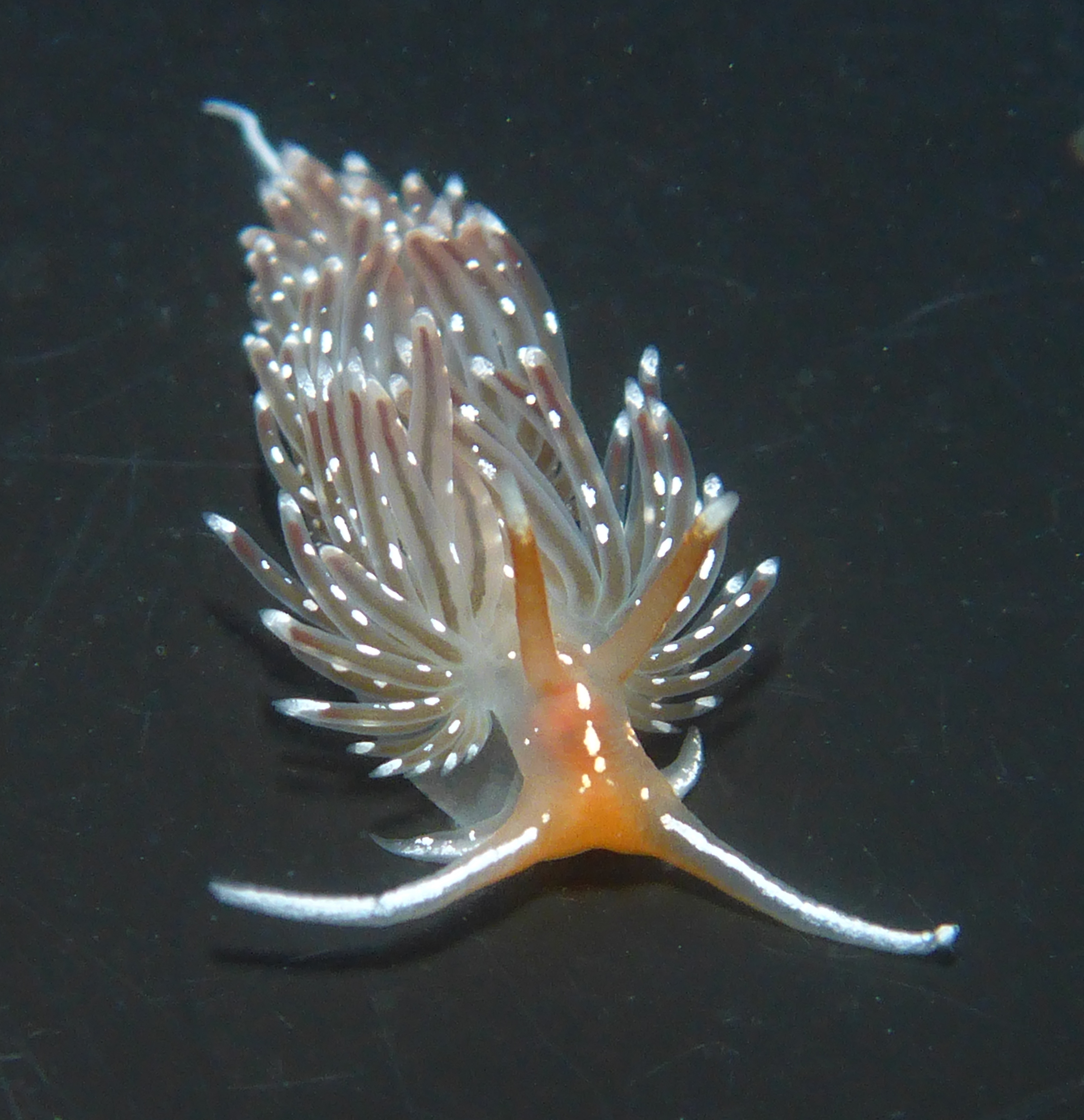
- Sakuraeolis cf. enosimensis from San Francisco Bay, California

Scientific classification
- Kingdom: Animalia
- Phylum: Mollusca
- Class: Gastropoda
- Order: Nudibranchia
- Suborder: Aeolidacea
- Family: Facelinidae
- Genus: Sakuraeolis; Baba, 1965

= Sakuraeolis =

Genus of gastropods

Sakuraeolis is a genus of sea slugs, aeolid nudibranchs, marine gastropod molluscs in the family Facelinidae.

== Species ==
Species within the genus Sakuraeolis include:

- Sakuraeolis arcana Ellis-Diamond, Picton, Tibiriçá & Sigwart, 2021
- Sakuraeolis enosimensis (Baba, 1930)
- Sakuraeolis gerberina Hirano, 1999
- Sakuraeolis gujaratica Rudman, 1980
- Sakuraeolis japonica (Baba, 1937)
- Sakuraeolis kirembosa Rudman, 1980
- Sakuraeolis marhe Fernández-Simón & Moles, 2023
- Sakuraeolis nungunoides Rudman, 1980
- Sakuraeolis sakuracea Hirano, 1999

Species brought into synonymy

- Sakuraeolis modesta (Bergh, 1880): synonym of Sakuraeolis japonica (Baba, 1937)
Sakuraeolis arcana, Mozambique

Sakuraeolis enosimensis, Japan

Sakuraeolis gerberina, Japan

Sakuraeolis kirembosa, Mozambique

Sakuraeolis nungunoides, Kenya

Sakuraeolis sakuracea, Taiwan
