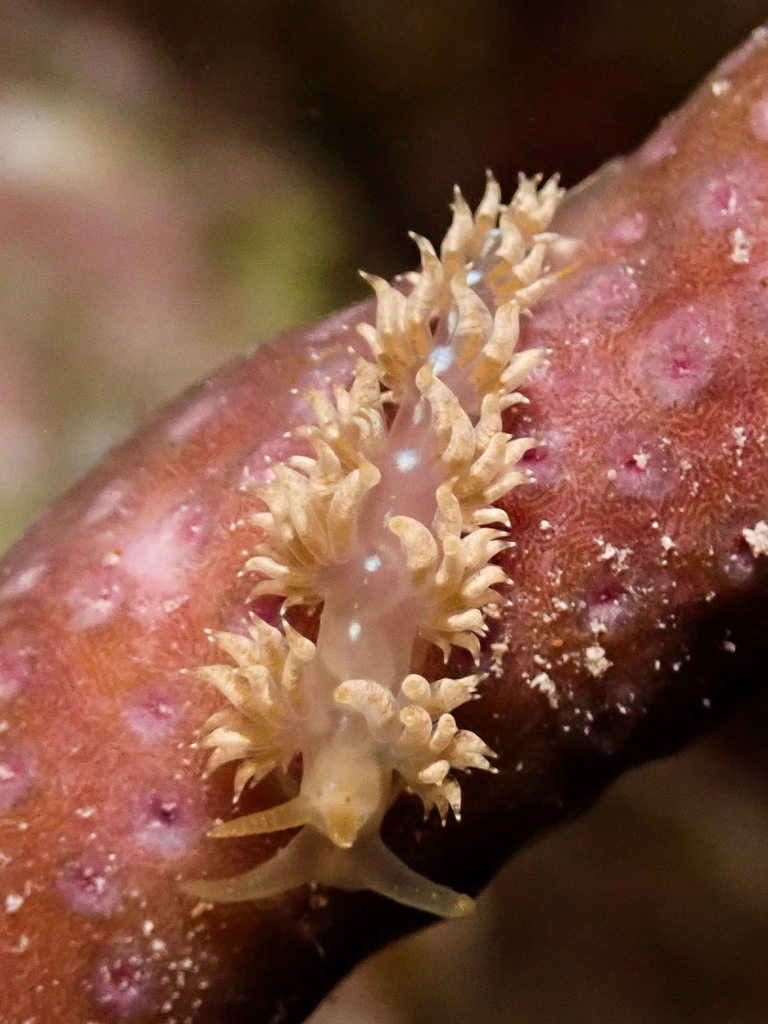

Scientific classification
- Kingdom: Animalia
- Phylum: Mollusca
- Class: Gastropoda
- Order: Nudibranchia
- Suborder: Aeolidacea
- Family: Facelinidae
- Genus: Pauleo
- Species: P. jubatus

Binomial name
- Pauleo jubatus Millen & Hamann, 1992

= Pauleo =

Species of gastropod

Pauleo jubatus is a species of sea slug, specifically an aeolid nudibranch. It is a marine gastropod mollusc in the family Facelinidae. It is the only species in the genus Pauleo.

== Distribution ==
The holotype of this species was found at Taino Beach, Grand Bahama, Bahamas, 26°29′58″N 78°36′45″W. Additional localities mentioned in the description include Grand Cayman, Little Cayman, Jamaica, Eleuthera, Belize and Honduras.

== Ecology ==
This species feeds on the gorgonian coral Plexaurella dichotoma. Feeding on soft corals instead of hydroids is typical of the genus Phyllodesmium but in Phyllodesmium there are no functional cnidosacs, possibly because the cnidae of soft corals are not useful in defence of the nudibranchs. Pauleo differs from Phyllodesmium in having functional cnidosacs.
