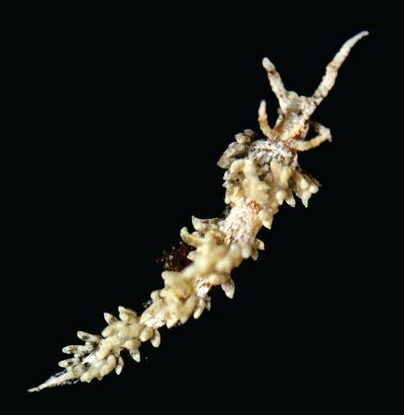
- Dorsal view of Palisa papillata

Scientific classification
- Kingdom: Animalia
- Phylum: Mollusca
- Class: Gastropoda
- Order: Nudibranchia
- Suborder: Aeolidacea
- Family: Facelinidae
- Genus: Palisa; Edmunds, 1964
- Species: P. papillata

Binomial name
- Palisa papillata Edmunds, 1964

= Palisa =

Species of gastropod

Palisa papillata is a species of sea slug, specifically an aeolid nudibranch. It is a marine gastropod mollusc in the family Facelinidae. It is the only species in the genus Palisa.

== Distribution ==
Distribution of Palisa papillata includes Florida, Jamaica and Panama. The holotype of this species was found at Port Royal, Jamaica and a specimen from Miami, Florida was included in the original description.

== Description ==
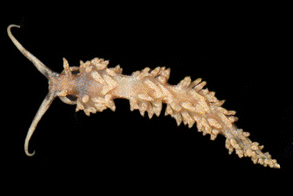
Dorsal view of Palisa papillata.

The body is elongate. Rhinophores are tuberculate. Oral tentacles are long. Cerata are arranged in clusters forming a single row along each side of the dorsum. Background color is translucent gray with numerous opaque white spots on both the dorsum and cerata. Cerata are with a pale blue digestive gland and characteristic black or dark brown spots at the base. The maximum recorded body length is 15 or 16 mm.

== Habitat ==
Minimum recorded depth is 0.1 m. Maximum recorded depth is 1 m.

It was found among algae in Panama. It is probably feeding on epiphytic hydroids.
