= Bajaeolis =

Scientific classification
- Kingdom: Animalia
- Phylum: Mollusca
- Class: Gastropoda
- Order: Nudibranchia
- Suborder: Aeolidacea
- Family: Flabellinopsidae
- Genus: Bajaeolis; Gosliner & Behrens, 1986
- Species: B. bertschi

Binomial name
- Bajaeolis bertschi Gosliner & Behrens, 1986

Genus of gastropods

Bajaeolis bertschi is a species of sea slug, specifically an aeolid nudibranch. It is a marine gastropod mollusc in the family Flabellinopsidae , and the only species in the genus Bajaeolis.

== Distribution ==
The holotype of this species was found at 10 m depth at Punta la Gringa, Bahía de los Ángeles, on the Gulf of California coast of Mexico. Additional specimens used in the original description were from nearby Isla de Corona and from Islas Perlas, Bahía de Panama, Panama. It has also been reported from Northern Peru.
