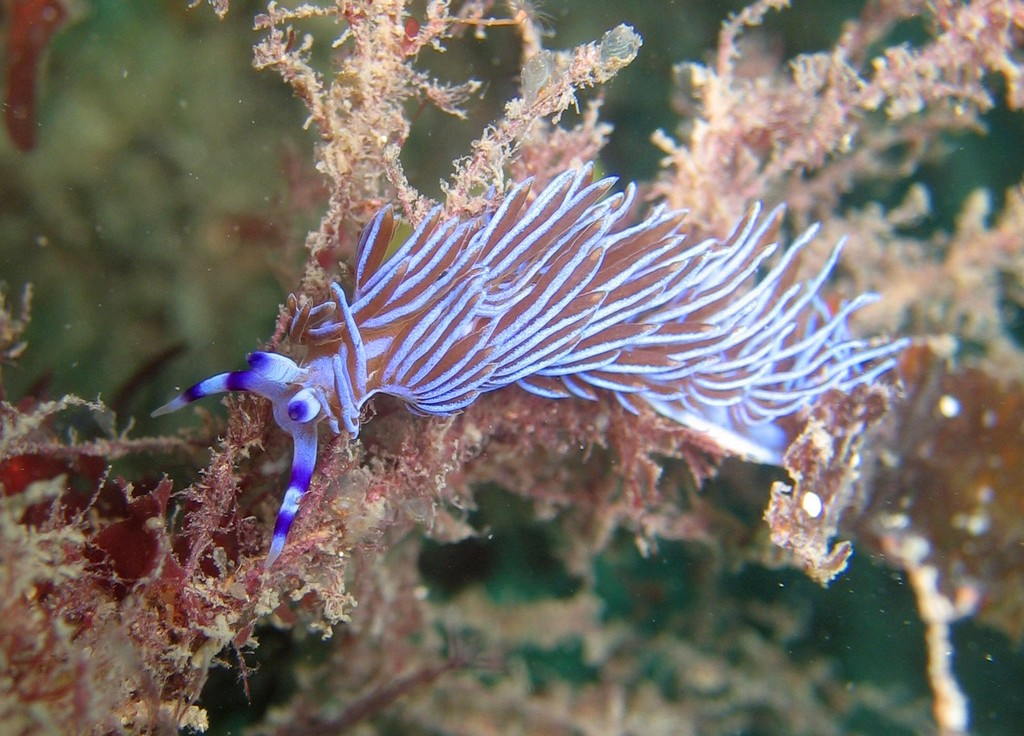
- Pteraeolidia ianthina

Scientific classification
- Kingdom: Animalia
- Phylum: Mollusca
- Class: Gastropoda
- Order: Nudibranchia
- Suborder: Aeolidacea
- Family: Facelinidae
- Genus: Pteraeolidia; Bergh, 1875

Type species
- Pteraeolidia semperi (Bergh, 1870)

= Pteraeolidia =

Genus of gastropods

Pteraeolidia is a genus of sea slugs, aeolid nudibranchs, marine gastropod molluscs in the family Facelinidae.

== Species ==
Species within the genus Pteraeolidia include:

- Pteraeolidia annulata Eliot, 1910
- Pteraeolidia ianthina (Angas, 1864)
- Pteraeolidia semperi (Bergh, 1870)

A 2015 study suggests that Pteraeolidia semperi is a species complex and there are many species of it in the Indo-Pacific region. Subsequent studies have investigated this further, thus far identifying two clades within the P. semperi complex.
