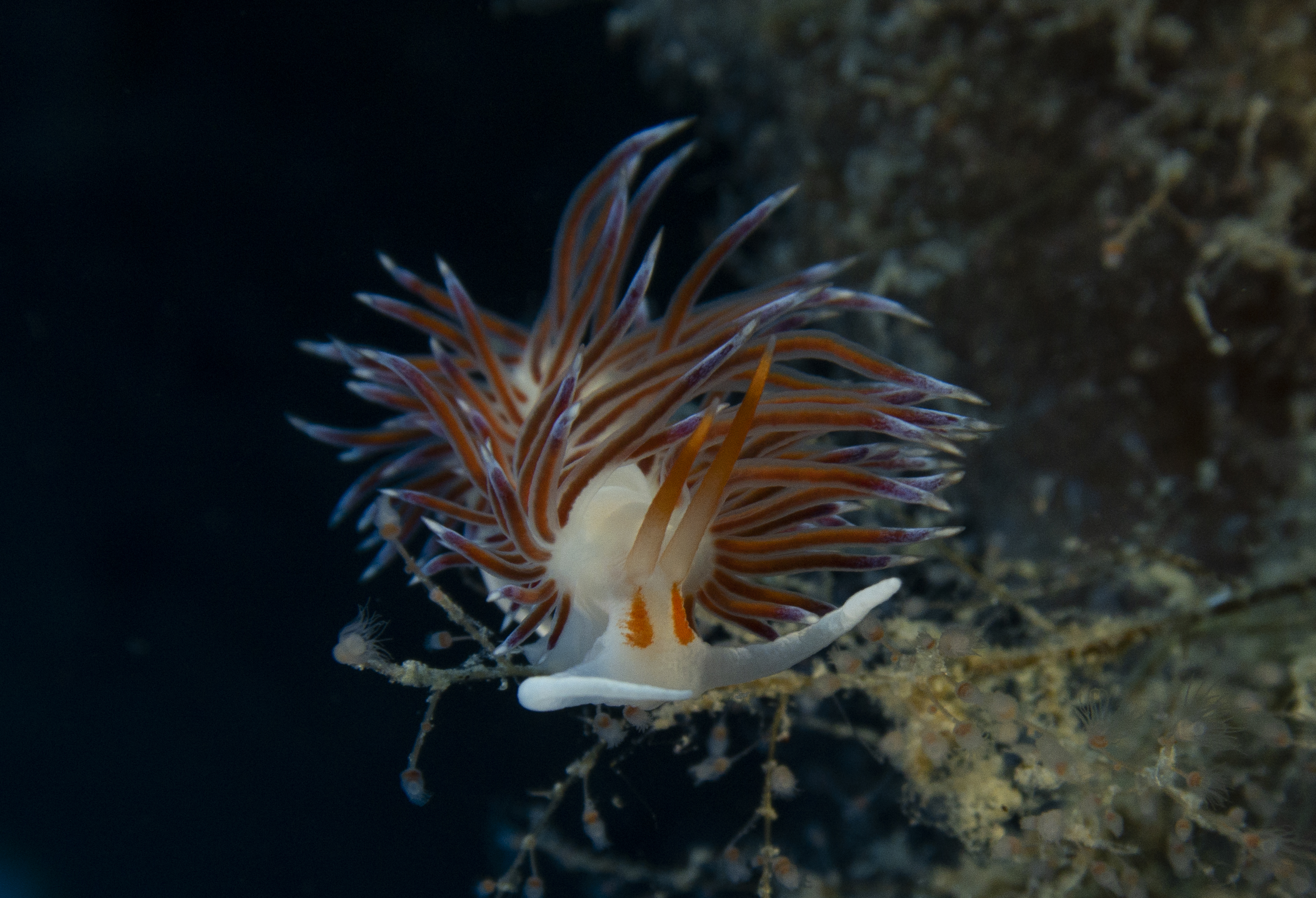
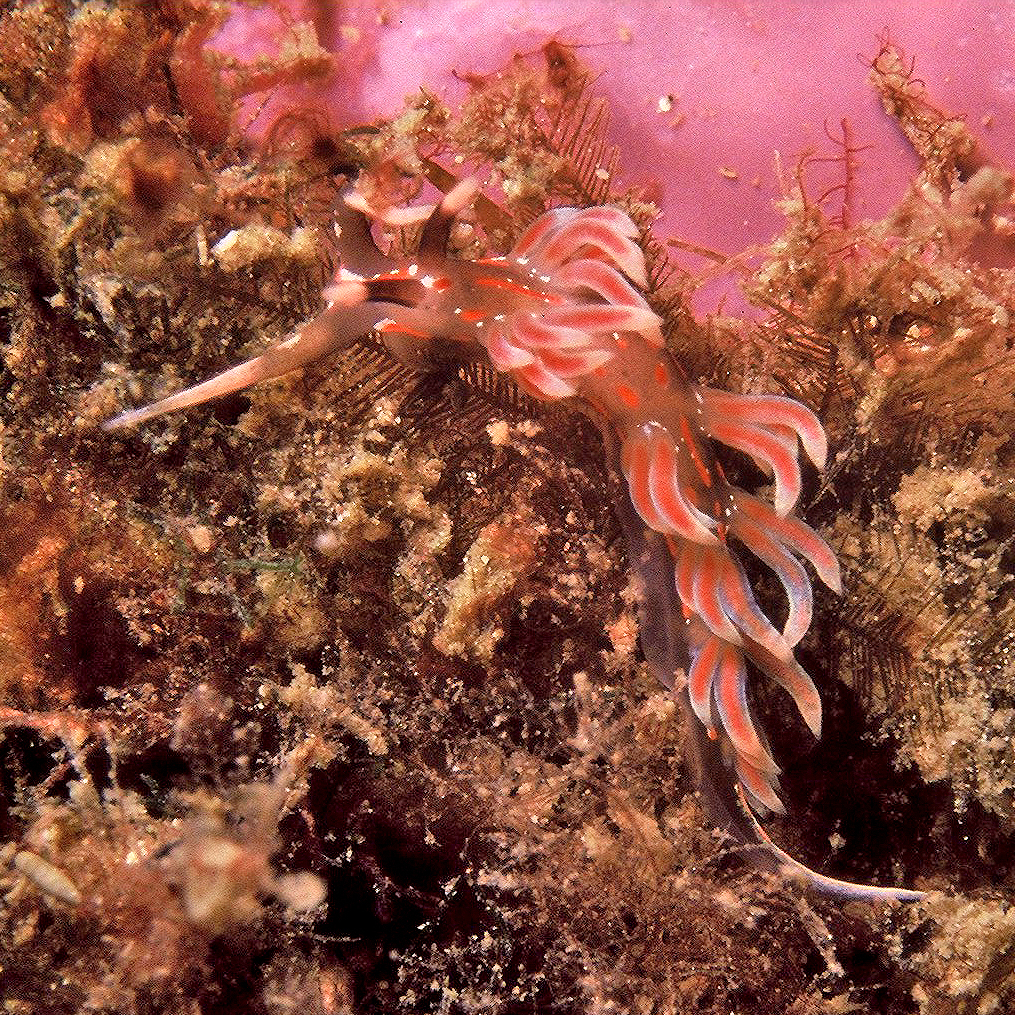
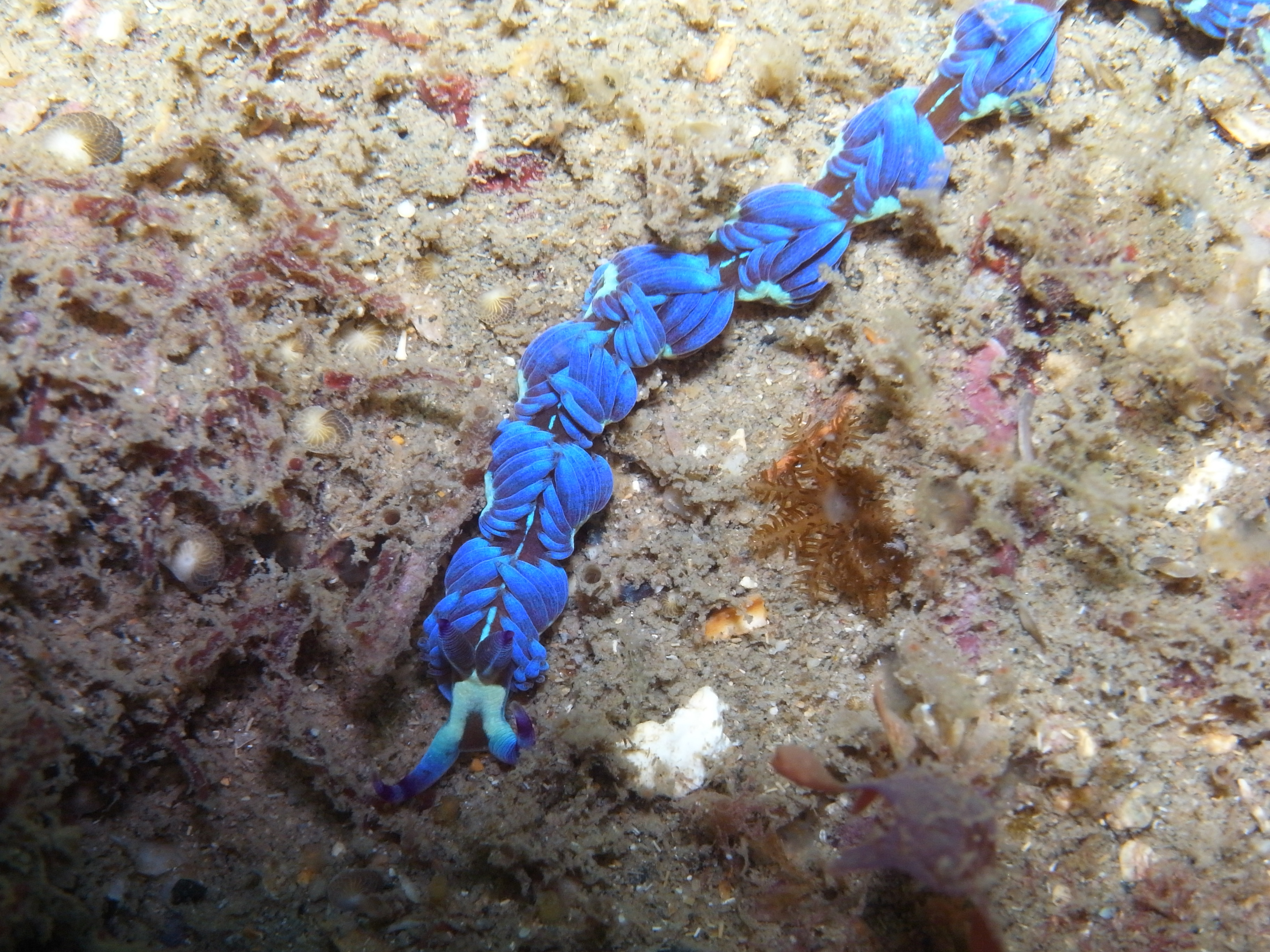
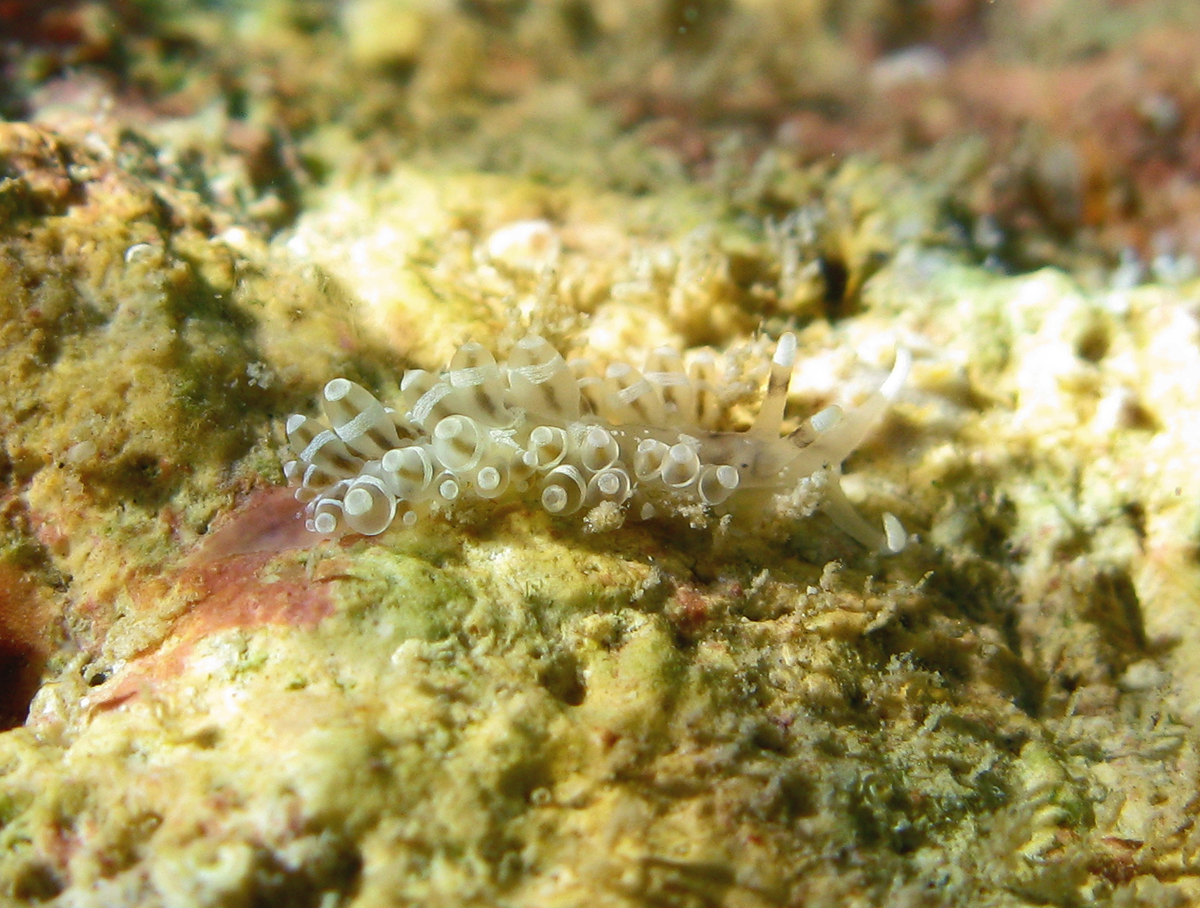
- From left to right in each row, from top to bottom: Cratena peregrina, Facelina rubrovittata, Pteraeolidia ianthina, and Herviella albida

Scientific classification
- Kingdom: Animalia
- Phylum: Mollusca
- Class: Gastropoda
- Order: Nudibranchia
- Suborder: Aeolidacea
- Superfamily: Aeolidioidea
- Family: Facelinidae; Bergh, 1889

Genera
- See Taxonomy

Synonyms
- Caloriidae Odhner, 1968; Cratenidae Bergh, 1889; Favorinidae Bergh, 1889; Phidianidae Odhner, 1968; Phyllodesmiidae Thiele, 1931

= Facelinidae =

Family of gastropods

The Facelinidae is a family of aeolid nudibranchs. They are marine gastropod molluscs.

== Taxonomy ==
According to the taxonomy of the Gastropoda by Bouchet & Rocroi, 2005, this family contains the following subfamilies:

- Facelininae Bergh, 1889 - synonyms: Caloriidae Odhner, 1968; Phidianidae Odhner, 1968; Pruvotfoliinae Tardy, 1970
- Babakininae Roller, 1973 - synonym: Babainidae Roller, 1972 (inv.)
- Crateninae Bergh, 1889 - synonym: Rizzoliinae Odhner, 1939 (inv.)
- Favorininae Bergh, 1889 - synonyms: Myrrhinidae Bergh, 1905; Phyllodesmiinae Thiele, 1931; Facalaninae Er. Marcus, 1958
- Herviellinae Burn, 1967
- Pteraeolidiinae Risbec, 1953

In 2007, Gosliner and colleagues elevated the subfamily Babakininae to family Babakinidae.

According to Korshunova and colleagues (2025), the following genera are recognised in the family Facelinidae:

- Adfacelina Millen & Hermosillo, 2012
- Algarvia Garcia-Gomez & Cervera, 1989
- Amanda Macnae, 1954
- Anetarca Gosliner, 1991
- Antonietta Schmekel, 1966
- Austraeolis Burn, 1962
- Bajaeolis Gosliner & Behrens, 1986
- Burnaia Miller, 2001
- Caloria Trinchese, 1888
- Cratena Bergh, 1864
- Dicata Schmekel, 1967
- Echinopsole Macnae, 1954
- Emarcusia Roller, 1972
- Facelina Alder & Hancock, 1855
- Facelinopsis Pruvot-Fol, 1954
- Hermosita Gosliner & Behrens, 1986
- Herviella Baba, 1949
- Janssonius Ortea and Moro, 2022
- Jason Miller, 1974
- Learchis Bergh, 1896
- Moridilla Bergh, 1888
- Myja Bergh 1896
- Noumeaella Risbec, 1937
- Palisa Edmunds, 1964
- Pauleo Millen & Hamann, 1992
- Phidiana Gray, 1850
- Pruvotfolia Tardy, 1969
- Pteraeolidia Bergh, 1875
- Sakuraeolis Baba, 1965
- Setoeolis Baba & Hamatani 1965
