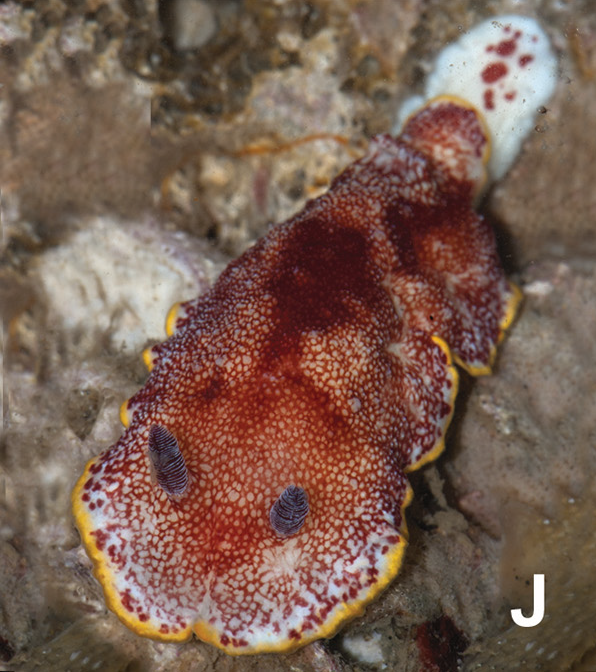

Scientific classification
- Kingdom: Animalia
- Phylum: Mollusca
- Class: Gastropoda
- Order: Nudibranchia
- Family: Chromodorididae
- Genus: Goniobranchus
- Species: G. alderi

Binomial name
- Goniobranchus alderi (Collingwood, 1881)

Synonyms
- Chromodoris alderi Collingwood, 1881; Glossodoris (Chromodoris) alderi (Collingwood, 1881)

= Goniobranchus alderi =

Species of gastropod

Goniobranchus alderi is a species of colourful sea slug, a dorid nudibranch, a marine gastropod mollusc in the family Chromodorididae.

== Distribution ==
This marine species was described from Keelung, Taiwan. It is also found in Japan.

== Description ==
Goniobranchus alderi has a pattern of red lines forming a loose reticulate network on the mantle. There is a series of deep red spots towards the margin and a yellow marginal line. The gills are white with red lines and the rhinophores have red clubs with small white spots. An animal from Sagami Bay, Japan identified as Chromodoris tinctoria is a good match for the original illustration.

== Similar species ==
This species has been confused with Goniobranchus tinctorius. A 2020 study has shown that there are probably five species without names in this complex, with Goniobranchus sp. 2 being most similar to G. alderi.
