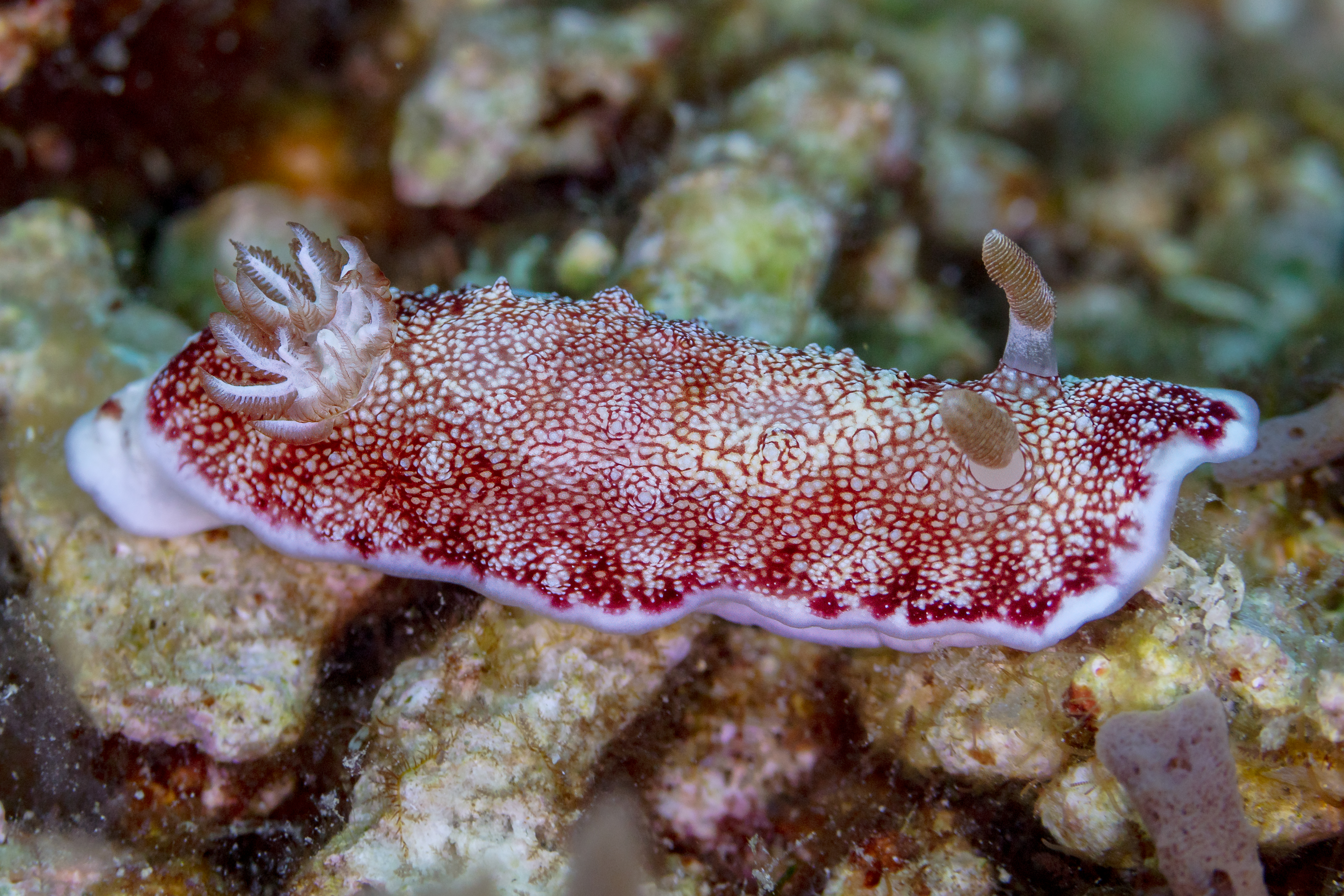
- Goniobranchus cf. reticulatus, Tulamben, Bali, Indonesia

Scientific classification
- Kingdom: Animalia
- Phylum: Mollusca
- Class: Gastropoda
- Order: Nudibranchia
- Family: Chromodorididae
- Genus: Goniobranchus
- Species: G. reticulatus

Binomial name
- Goniobranchus reticulatus (Quoy & Gaimard, 1832)

Synonyms
- Doris reticulata Quoy & Gaimard, 1832 (basionym); Chromodoris reticulata (Quoy & Gaimard, 1832); Risbecia reticulata (Quoy & Gaimard, 1832)

= Goniobranchus reticulatus =

Species of gastropod

Goniobranchus reticulatus is a species of colourful sea slug in the family Chromodorididae.

== Distribution ==
This species was described from Tongatapu. It has been widely reported from the Indo-West Pacific Ocean, but many of these records are now believed to be of distinct species.

== Description ==
The original description of this species from Voyage de la corvette l'Astrolabe in 1832:

French: Très-petite espèce, de douze à quinze lignes de longueur, ovalaire, à dos peu élevé, et dont le pied dépasse le manteau. Tout le dessus du corps est réticulé de rouge brun avec des taches de laque, tandis que le dessous est d'un beau blanc; le pied seul a son bord coloré de jaune. Les appendices labiaux, un peu pointus, sont aussi de cette couleur. Les tentacules sont striés et jaunâtres; une rainure joint les deux cavités qui les reçoit. Le contour de la cavité branchiale forme une saillie assez élevée à l'extrémité du manteau. Les folioles sont à douze ou treize divisions, lancéolées, en forme de pétales. Leur couleur est jaune.

[Very small species, twelve to fifteen lines in length, oval, with low back, and the foot of which exceeds the mantle. The entire upper part of the body is reticulated in reddish brown with lacquer spots, while the lower part is a beautiful white; the foot alone has its edge coloured yellow. The slightly pointed labial appendages are also of this colour. The tentacles are streaked and yellowish; a groove joins the two cavities which receives them. The contour of the gill cavity forms a fairly high projection at the end of the mantle. The leaflets are twelve or thirteen divisions, lanceolate, in the shape of petals. Their colour is yellow.]

— Jules Sébastien César Dumont d'Urville

There is considerable disagreement amongst experts over the identity of Goniobranchus reticulatus. The original description shows an animal with a white mantle, a red, reticulate pattern and a narrow white margin. The edge of the foot is yellow and the labial tentacles are tipped with yellow. There are no round spots in the margin or amongst the reticulate pattern. The length of the body is reported to reach 100 mm but the original description is of an animal 12–15 ligne (27–34 mm) in length. A number of similar species are known to occur within the Goniobranchus tinctorius colour group. The complex consists of at least 7 species and the true G. reticulatus is probably not the one normally being identified with this name.

The species is hermaphroditic, with both male and female organs active at the same time. After mating, the external portion of the penis detaches, but is able to regrow within 24 hours.
