= Goniobranchus tinctorius =

Scientific classification
- Kingdom: Animalia
- Phylum: Mollusca
- Class: Gastropoda
- Order: Nudibranchia
- Family: Chromodorididae
- Genus: Goniobranchus
- Species: G. tinctorius

Binomial name
- Goniobranchus tinctorius (Ruppell & Leuckart, 1828)

Synonyms
- Chromodoris tinctoria (Rüppell & Leuckart, 1828); Doris tinctoria Rüppell & Leuckart, 1828 (basionym)

Species of gastropod

Goniobranchus tinctorius is a species of colorful sea slug, a dorid nudibranch, a marine gastropod mollusk in the family Chromodorididae.

== Distribution ==
This species was described from the Red Sea. It also occurs in Oman. It has been reported widely in the tropical Indo-West Pacific but many of the records refer to Goniobranchus reticulatus, Goniobranchus alderi and similarly coloured, undescribed, species. Several of these have been shown to be distinct species by a DNA study.

== Description ==
Goniobranchus tinctorius has a white mantle with an open reticulation of fine red lines. Towards the margin these lines coalesce into red spots and outside this region are isolated red spots and blotches. There is a broad white band followed by a narrow yellow band at the edge of the mantle. The gills are white with two red lines on the outer surface which converge at the tip. The rhinophores have white shafts and red clubs with white edges to the lamellae. The length of the body can vary between 15 mm and 95 mm.
