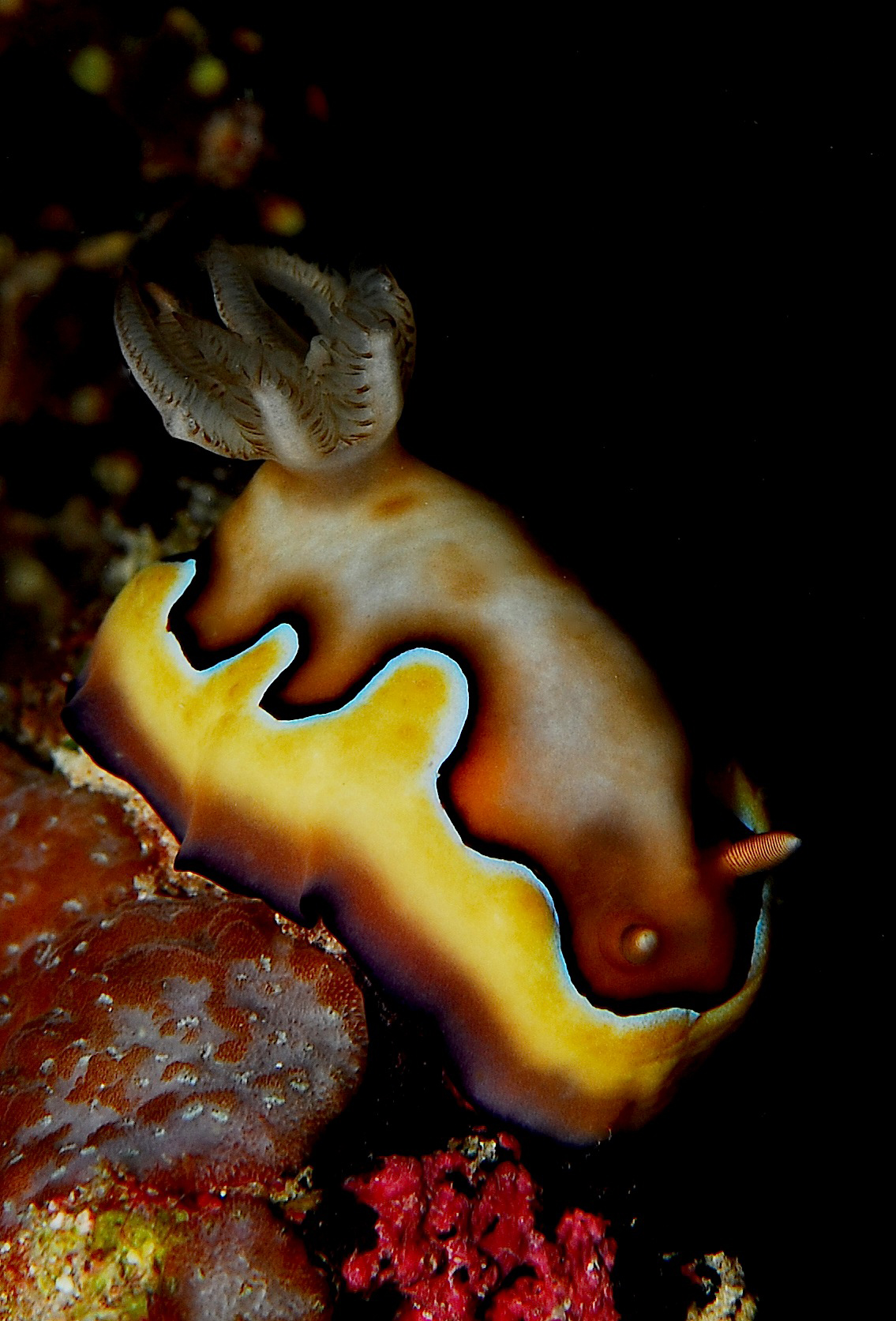
- Goniobranchus coi

Scientific classification
- Kingdom: Animalia
- Phylum: Mollusca
- Class: Gastropoda
- Order: Nudibranchia
- Family: Chromodorididae
- Genus: Goniobranchus (Pease, 1866)

Type species
- Doris vibrata Pease, 1860

Synonyms
- Lissodoris Odhner, 1934

= Goniobranchus =

Genus of gastropods

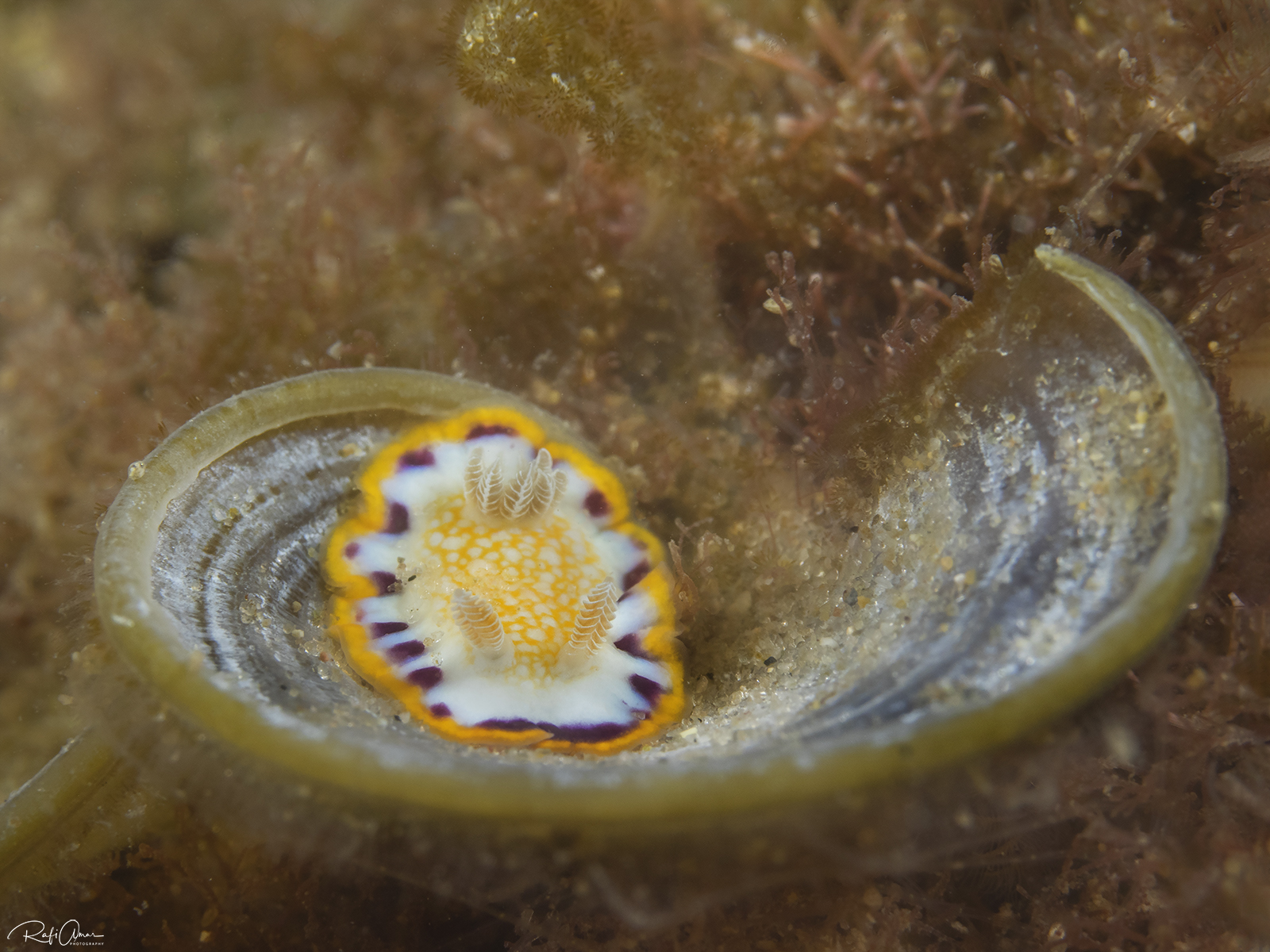
Goniobranchus obsoletus, Mediterranean off Israel, 2021

Goniobranchus is a genus of sea slugs, dorid nudibranchs, shell-less marine gastropod molluscs in the family Chromodorididae.

== Taxonomic history ==
Goniobranchus was described by Pease in 1866 but treated as a synonym of Chromodoris until 2012 when it was brought back into use for a clade revealed by molecular (DNA) techniques.

== Species ==
Species in the genus Goniobranchus include:

- Goniobranchus albomaculatus Pease, 1866
- Goniobranchus albonares (Rudman, 1990)
- Goniobranchus albopunctatus Garrett, 1879
- Goniobranchus albopustulosus (Pease, 1860)
- Goniobranchus alderi (Collingwood, 1881)
- Goniobranchus alius (Rudman, 1987)
- Goniobranchus annulatus (Eliot, 1904)
- Goniobranchus aureomarginatus (Cheeseman, 1881)
- Goniobranchus aureopurpureus (Collingwood, 1881)
- Goniobranchus aurigerus (Rudman, 1990)
- Goniobranchus bimaensis (Bergh, 1905)
- Goniobranchus bombayanus (Winckworth, 1946)
- Goniobranchus cavae (Eliot, 1904)
- Goniobranchus cazae (Gosliner & Behrens, 2004)
- Goniobranchus charlottae (Schrödl, 1999)
- Goniobranchus coi (Risbec, 1956)
- Goniobranchus collingwoodi (Rudman, 1987)
- Goniobranchus conchyliatus (Yonow, 1984)
- Goniobranchus daphne (Angas, 1864)
- Goniobranchus decorus (Pease, 1860)
- Goniobranchus epicurius (Basedow & Hedley, 1905)
- Goniobranchus fabulus (Soong & Gosliner, 2022)
- Goniobranchus fidelis (Kelaart, 1858)
- Goniobranchus galactos (Rudman & S. Johnson, 1985)
- Goniobranchus geminus (Rudman, 1987)
- Goniobranchus geometricus (Risbec, 1928)
- Goniobranchus gleniei (Kelaart, 1858)
- Goniobranchus heatherae (Gosliner, 1994)
- Goniobranchus hintuanensis (Gosliner & Behrens, 1998)
- Goniobranchus hunterae (Rudman, 1983)
- Goniobranchus kitae (Gosliner, 1994)
- Goniobranchus kuniei (Pruvot-Fol, 1930)
- Goniobranchus lekker (Gosliner, 1994)
- Goniobranchus leopardus (Rudman, 1987)
- Goniobranchus loringi (Angas, 1864)
- Goniobranchus mandapamensis (Valdés, Mollo & Ortea, 1999)
- Goniobranchus multimaculosus (Rudman, 1987)
- Goniobranchus obsoletus (Rüppell & Leuckart, 1831)
- Goniobranchus petechialis (Gould, 1852)
- Goniobranchus preciosus (Kelaart, 1858)
- Goniobranchus pruna (Gosliner, 1994)
- Goniobranchus pseudodecorus Yonow, 2018
- Goniobranchus reticulatus (Quoy & Gaimard, 1832)
- Goniobranchus roboi (Gosliner & Behrens, 1998)
- Goniobranchus rubrocornutus (Rudman, 1985)
- Goniobranchus rufomaculatus (Pease, 1871)
- Goniobranchus setoensis (Baba, 1938)
- Goniobranchus sinensis (Rudman, 1985)
- Goniobranchus splendidus (Angas, 1864)
- Goniobranchus tasmaniensis (Bergh, 1905)
- Goniobranchus tennentanus (Kelaart, 1859)
- Goniobranchus tinctorius (Rüppell & Leuckart, 1828)
- Goniobranchus trimarginatus (Winckworth, 1946)
- Goniobranchus tritos (Yonow, 1994)
- Goniobranchus tumuliferus (Collingwood, 1881)
- Goniobranchus verrieri (Crosse, 1875)
- Goniobranchus vibratus (Pease, 1860)
- Goniobranchus woodwardae (Rudman, 1983)

Species brought into synonymy

- Goniobranchus godeffroyanus (Bergh, 1877): synonym of Hypselodoris godeffroyana (Bergh, 1977)
- Goniobranchus naiki (Valdés, Mollo & Ortea, 1999): synonym of Goniobranchus bombayanus (Winckworth, 1946)
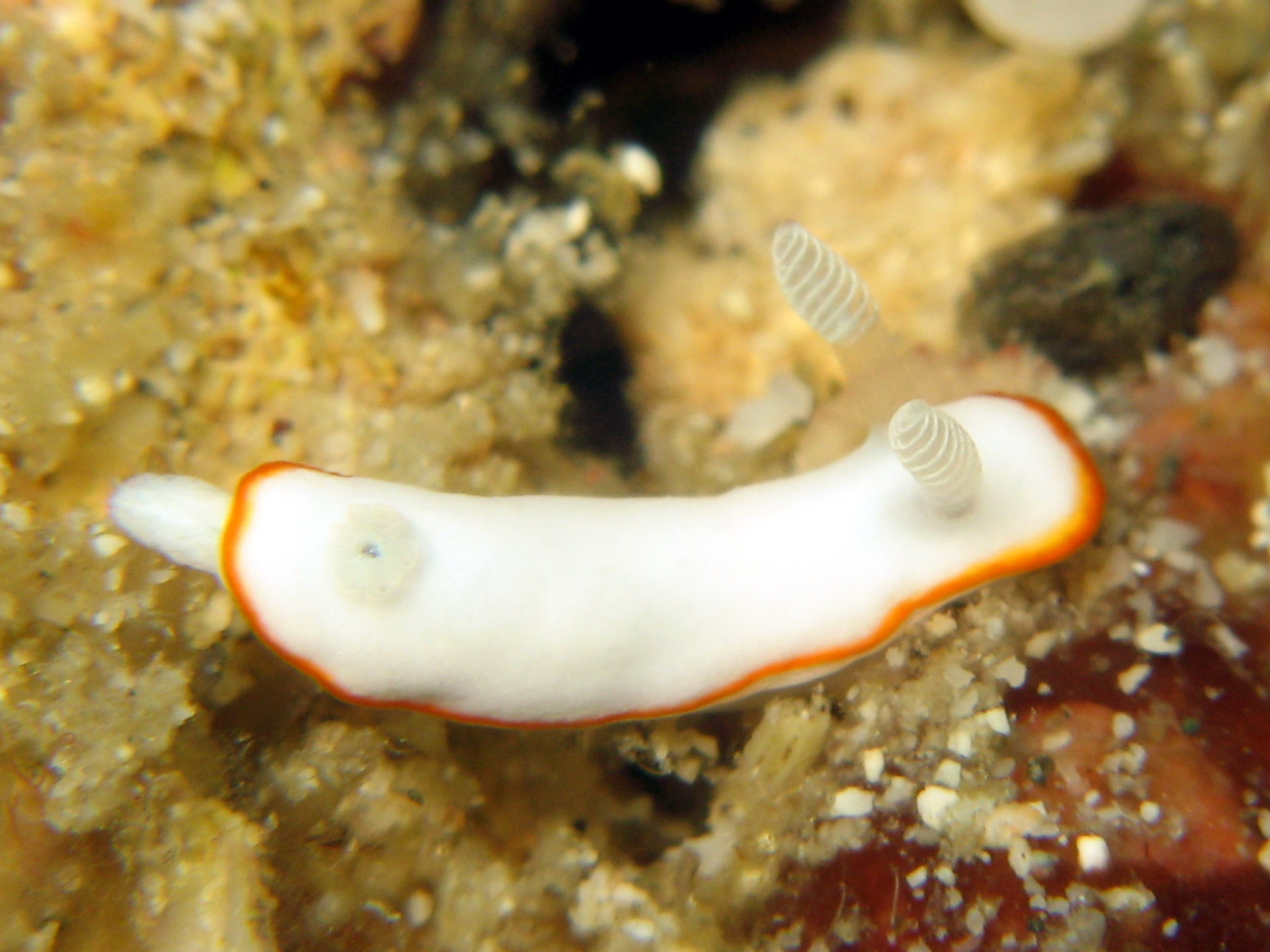
Goniobranchus cf. albonares

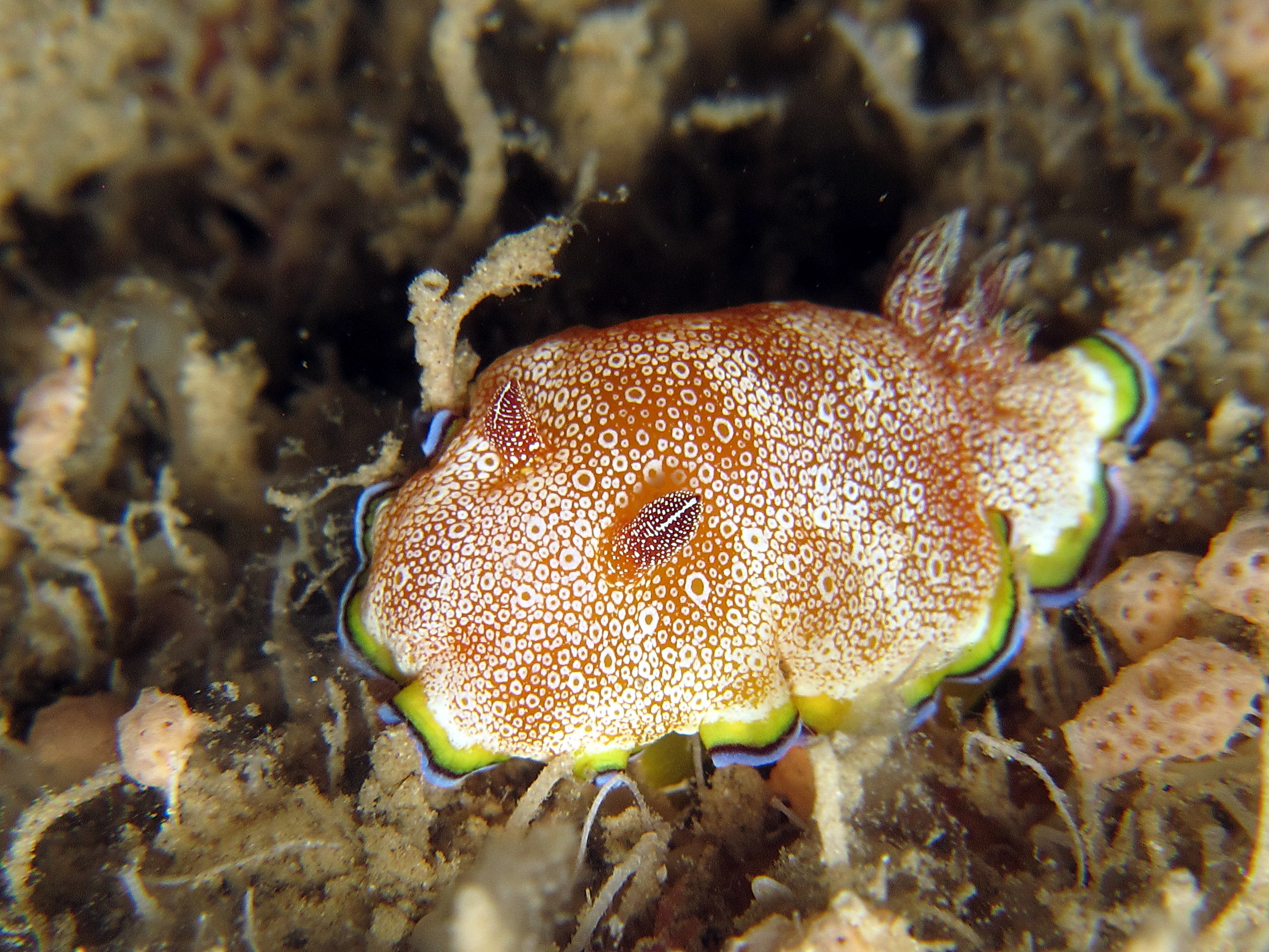
Goniobranchus albopunctatus

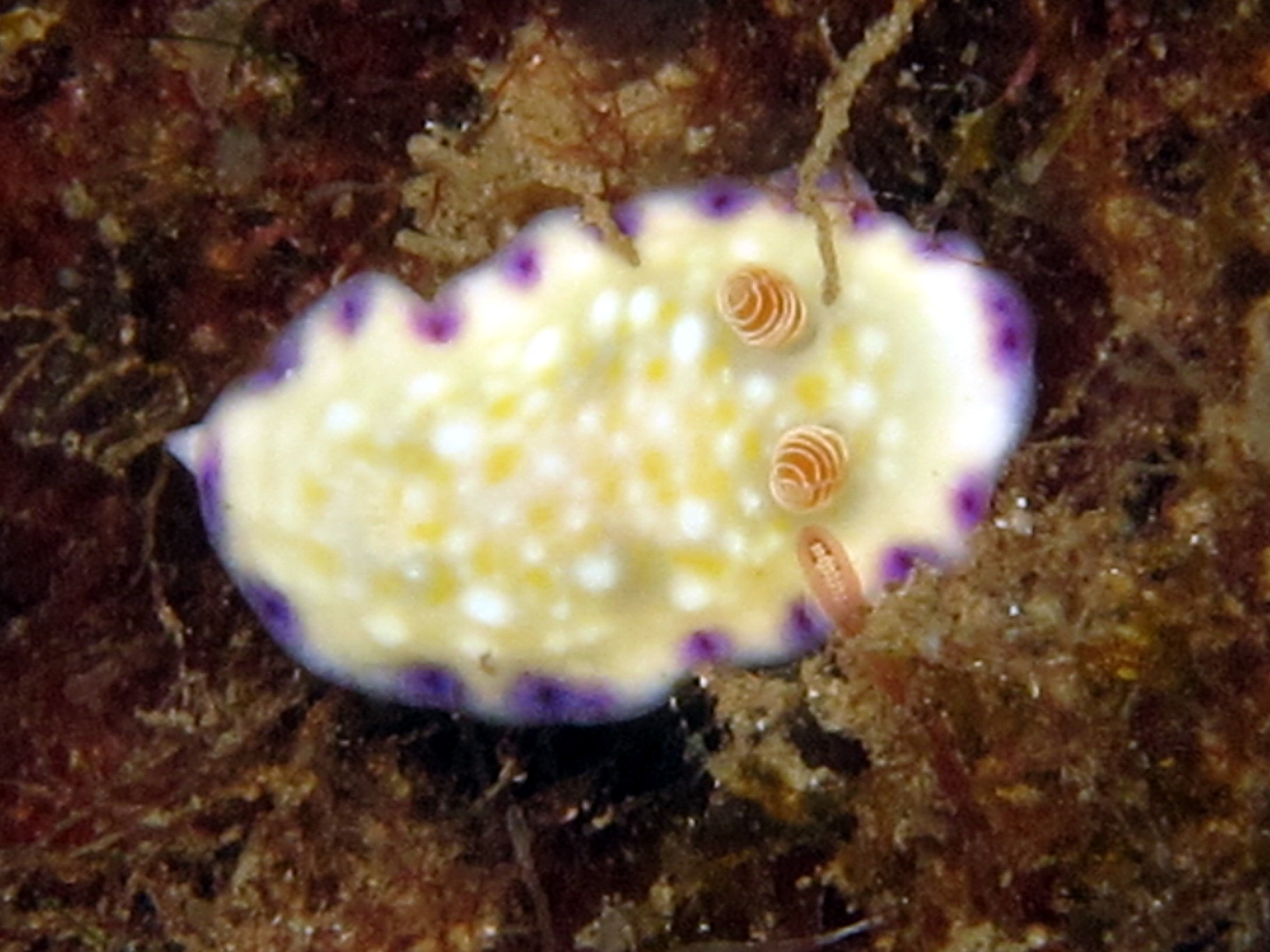
Goniobranchus albopustulosus

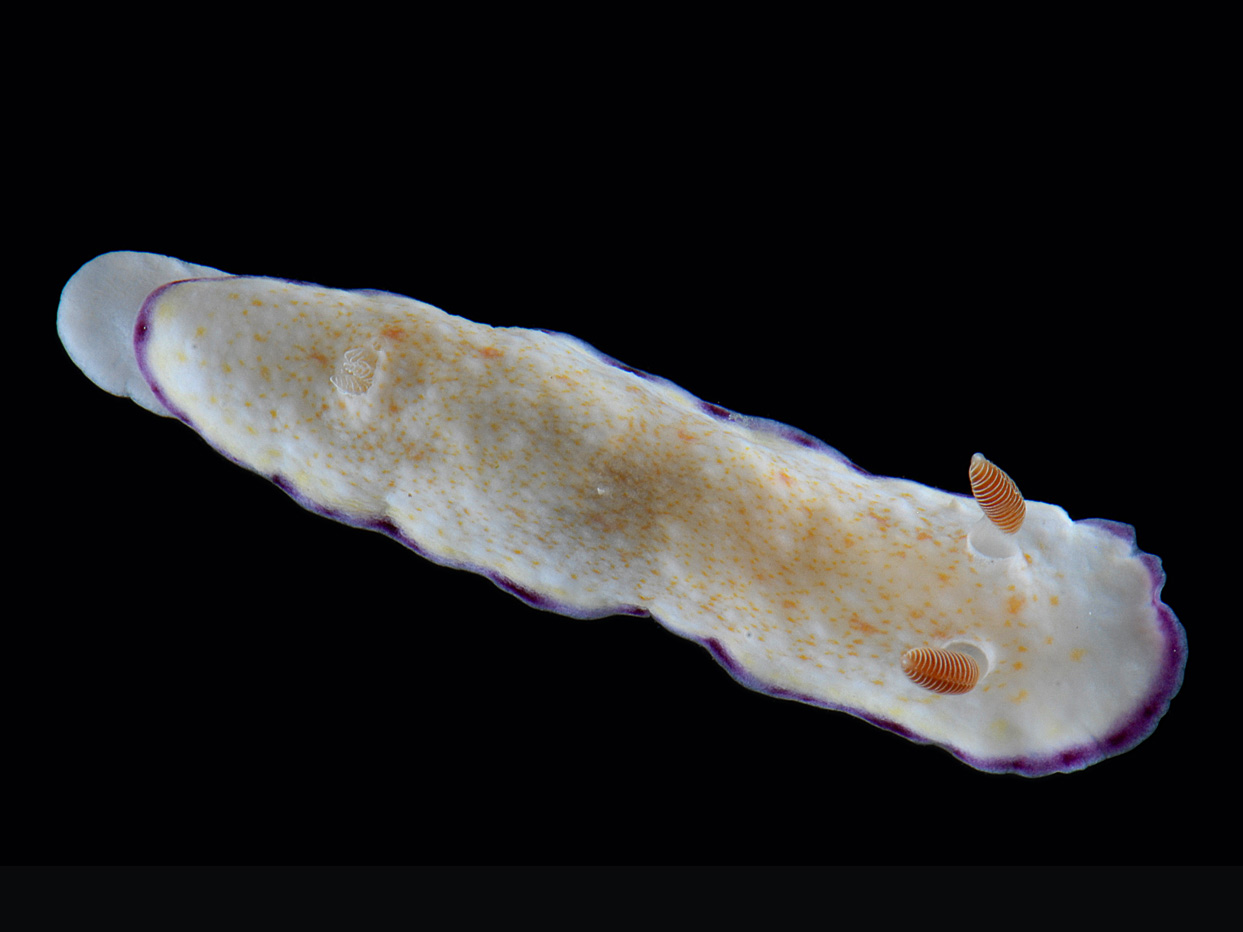
Goniobranchus alius

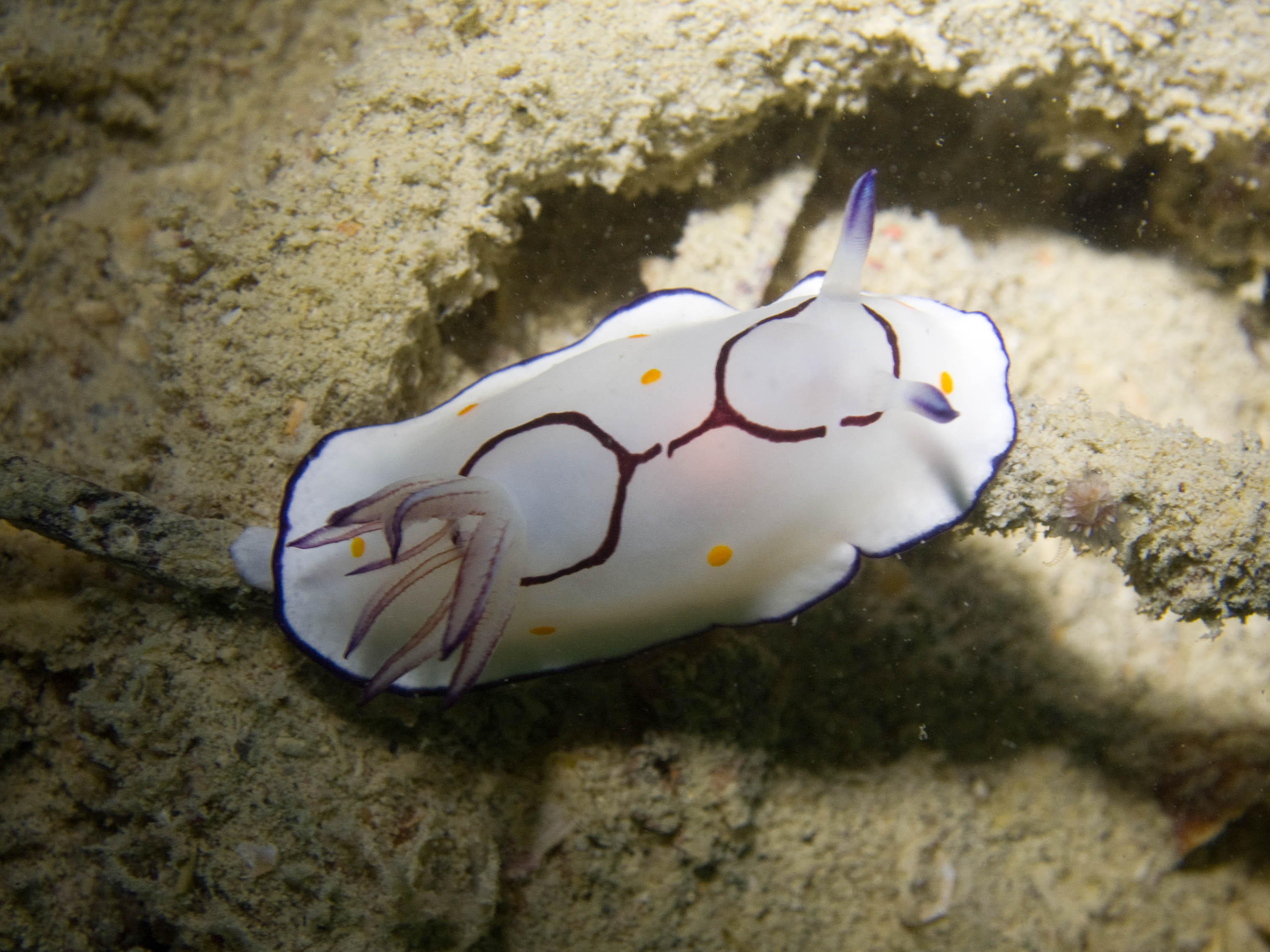
Goniobranchus annulatus

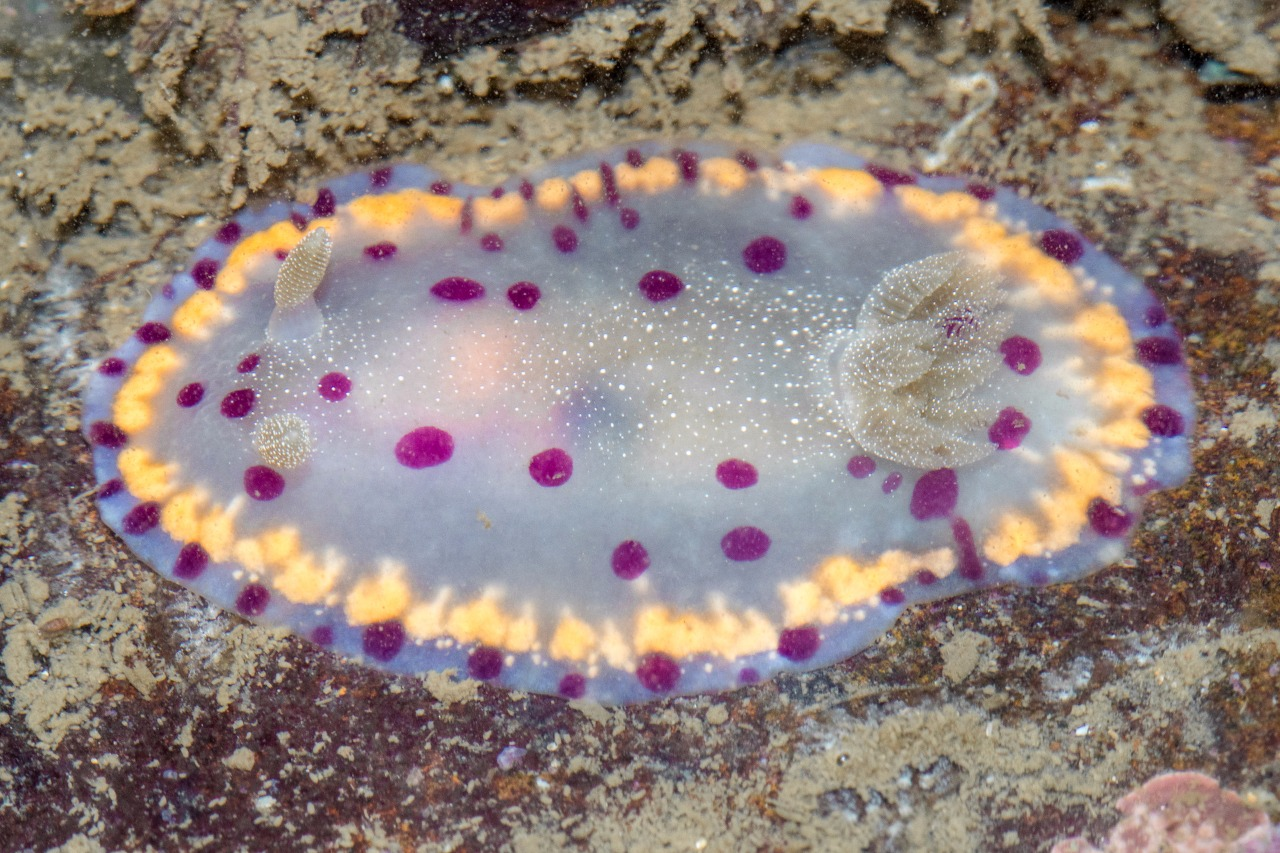
Goniobranchus bombayanus

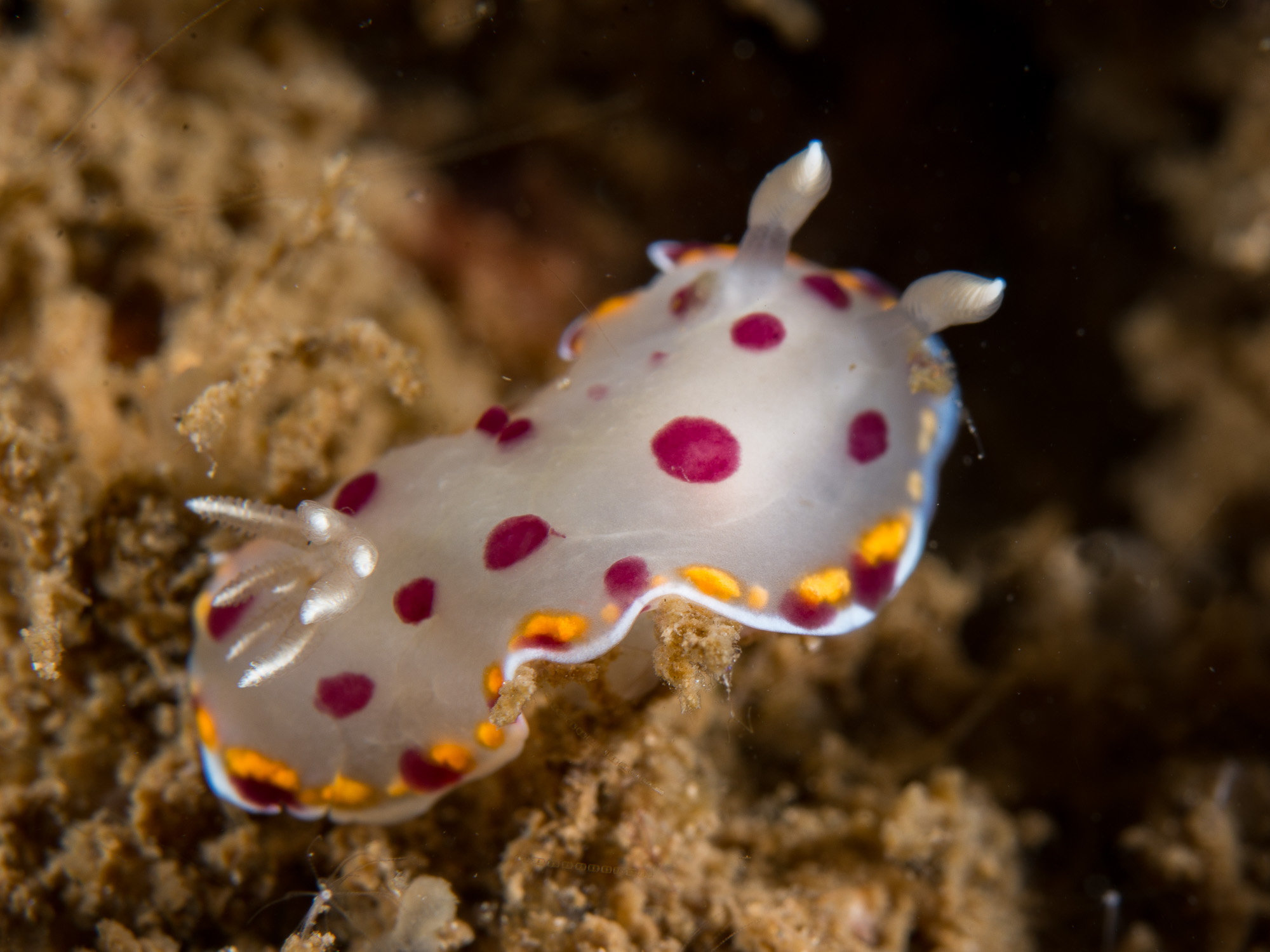
Goniobranchus bimaensis

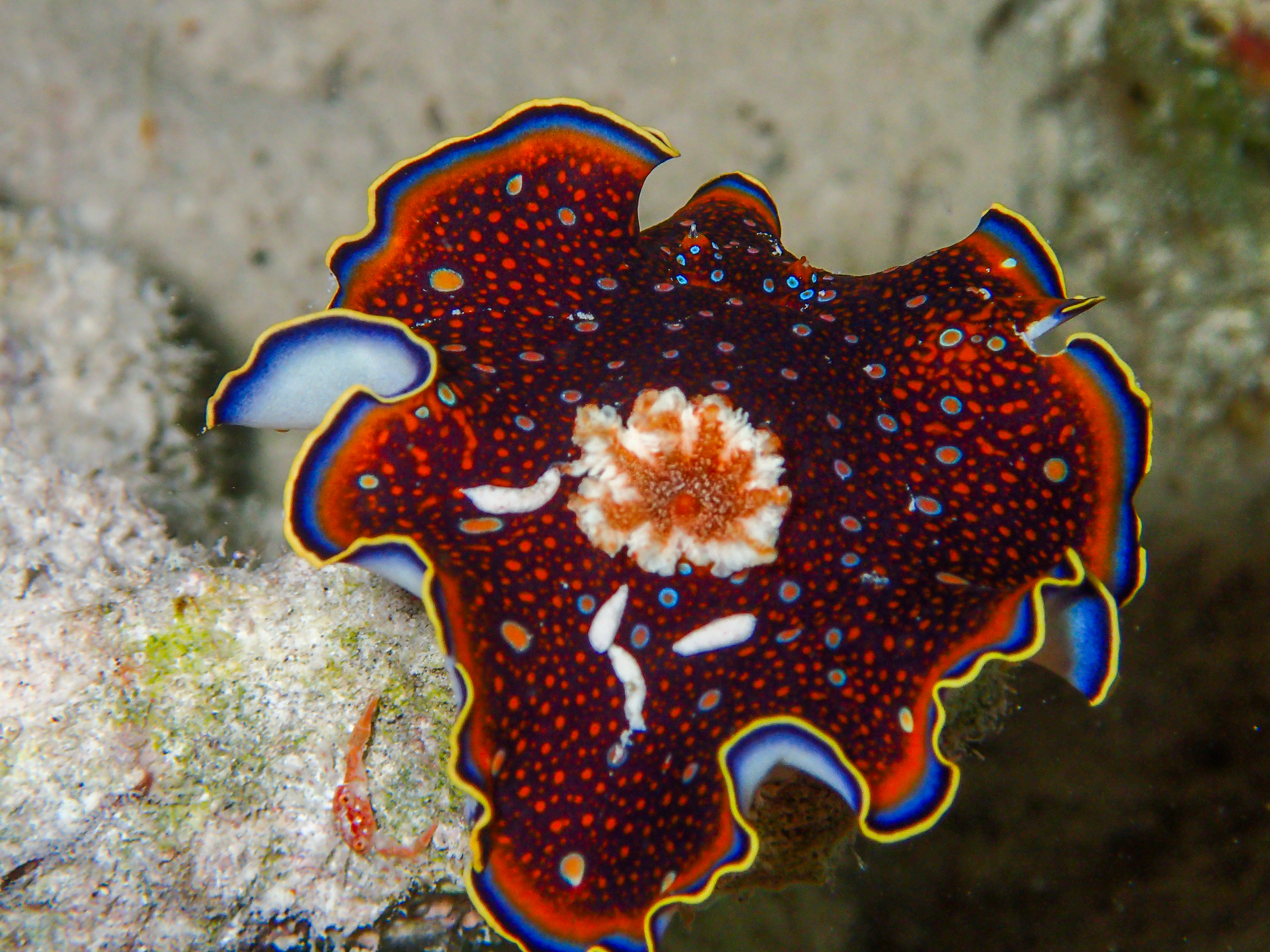
Goniobranchus charlottae

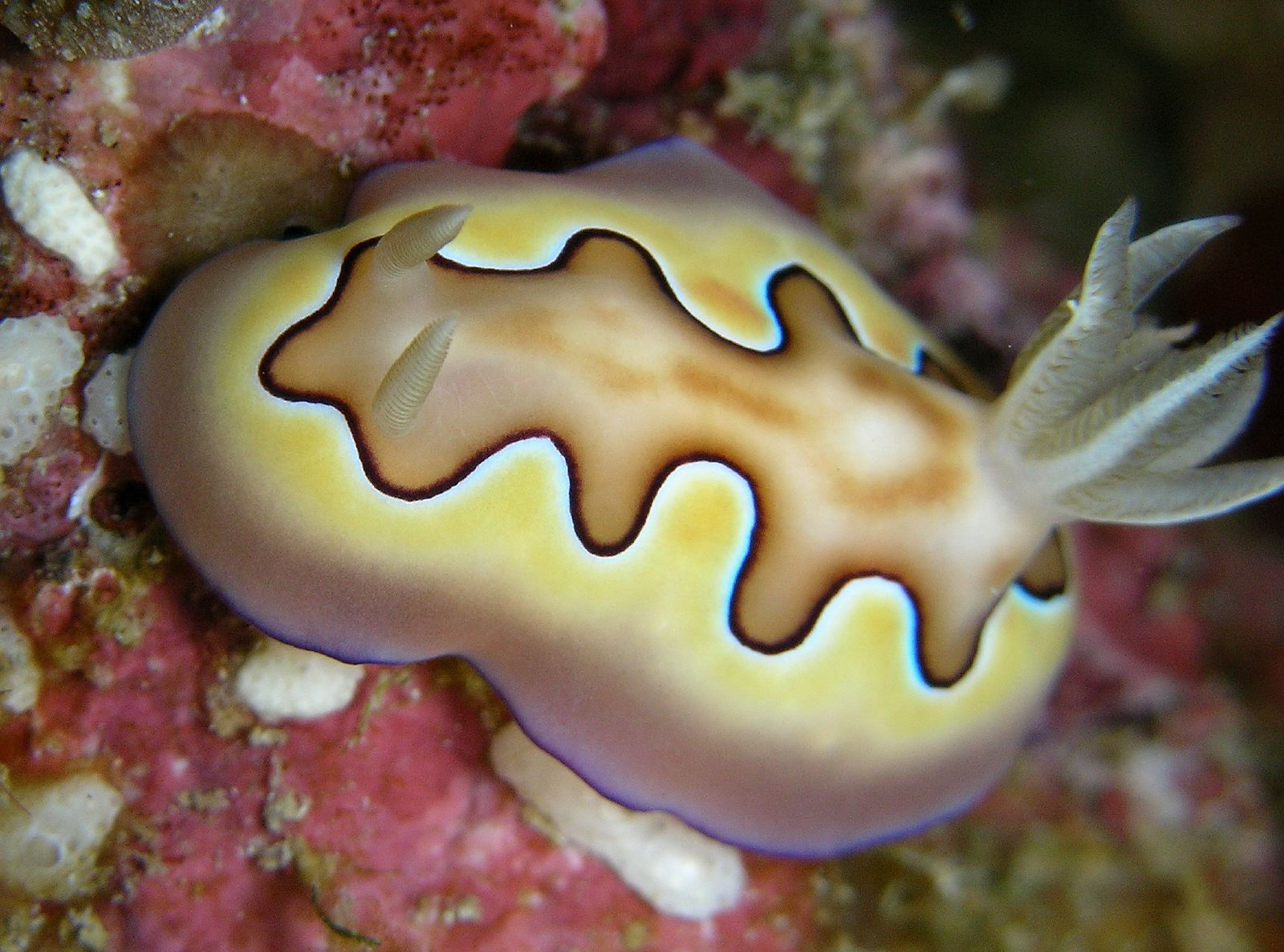
Goniobranchus coi

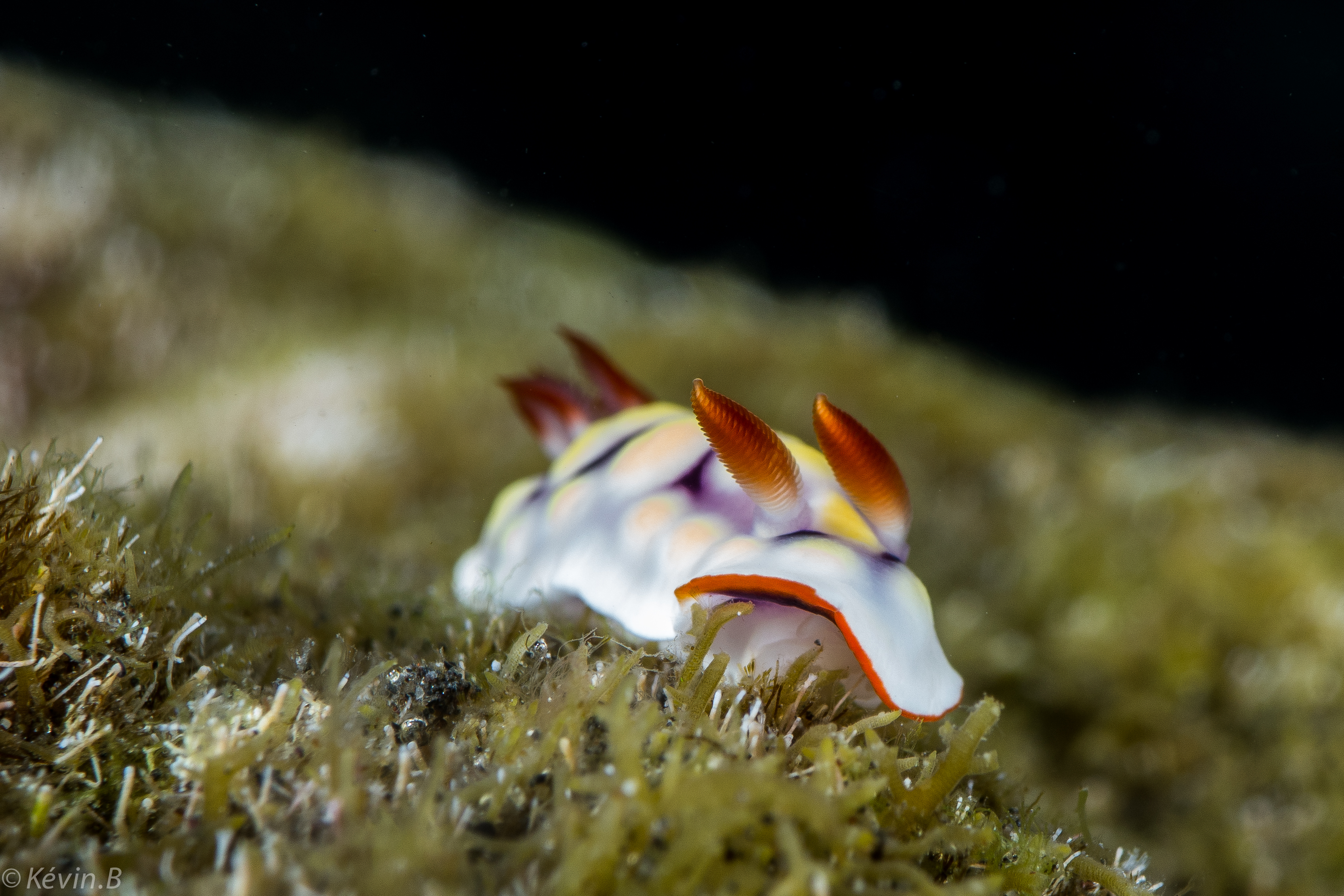
Goniobranchus conchyliatus

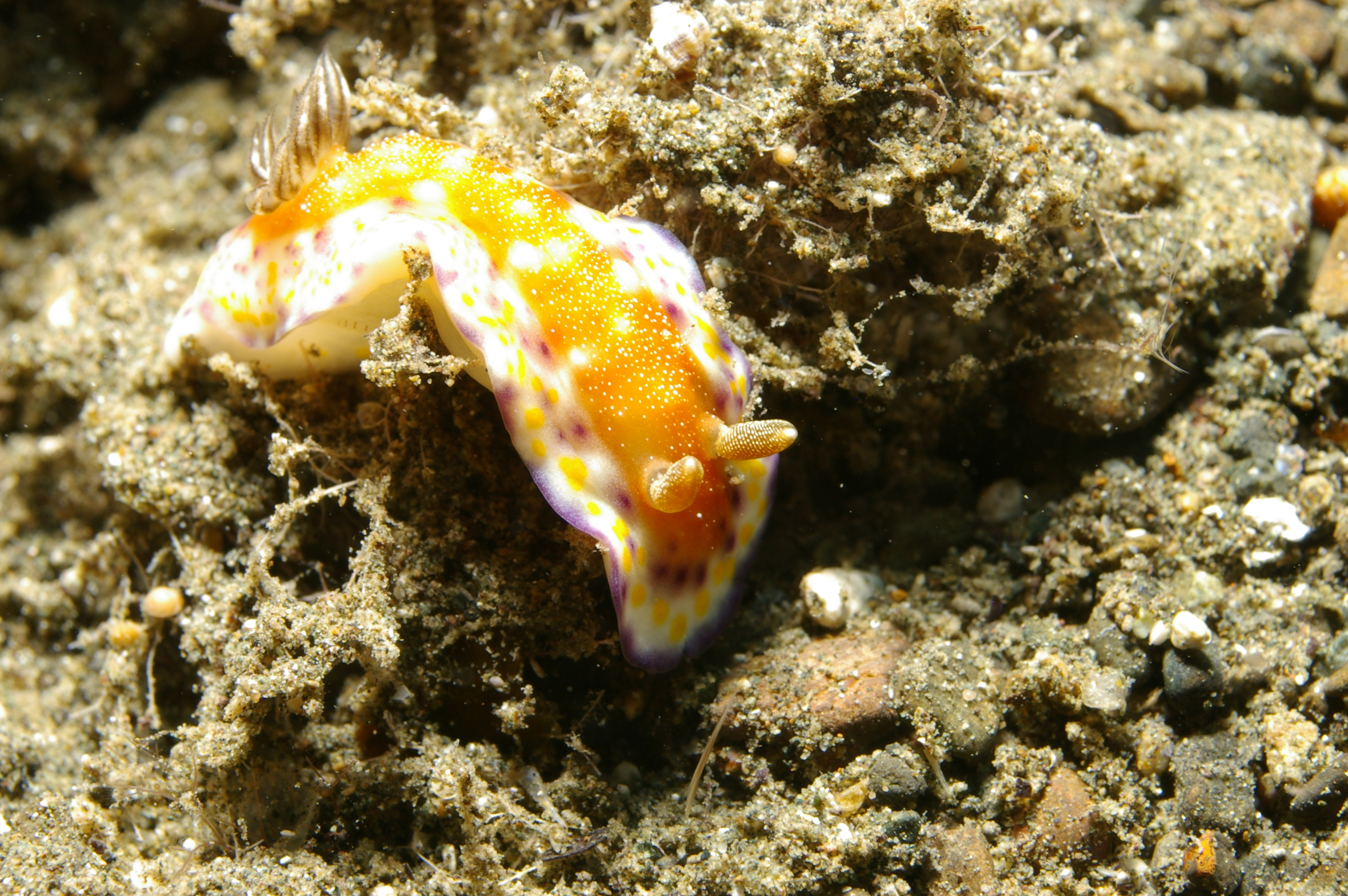
Goniobranchus collingwoodi

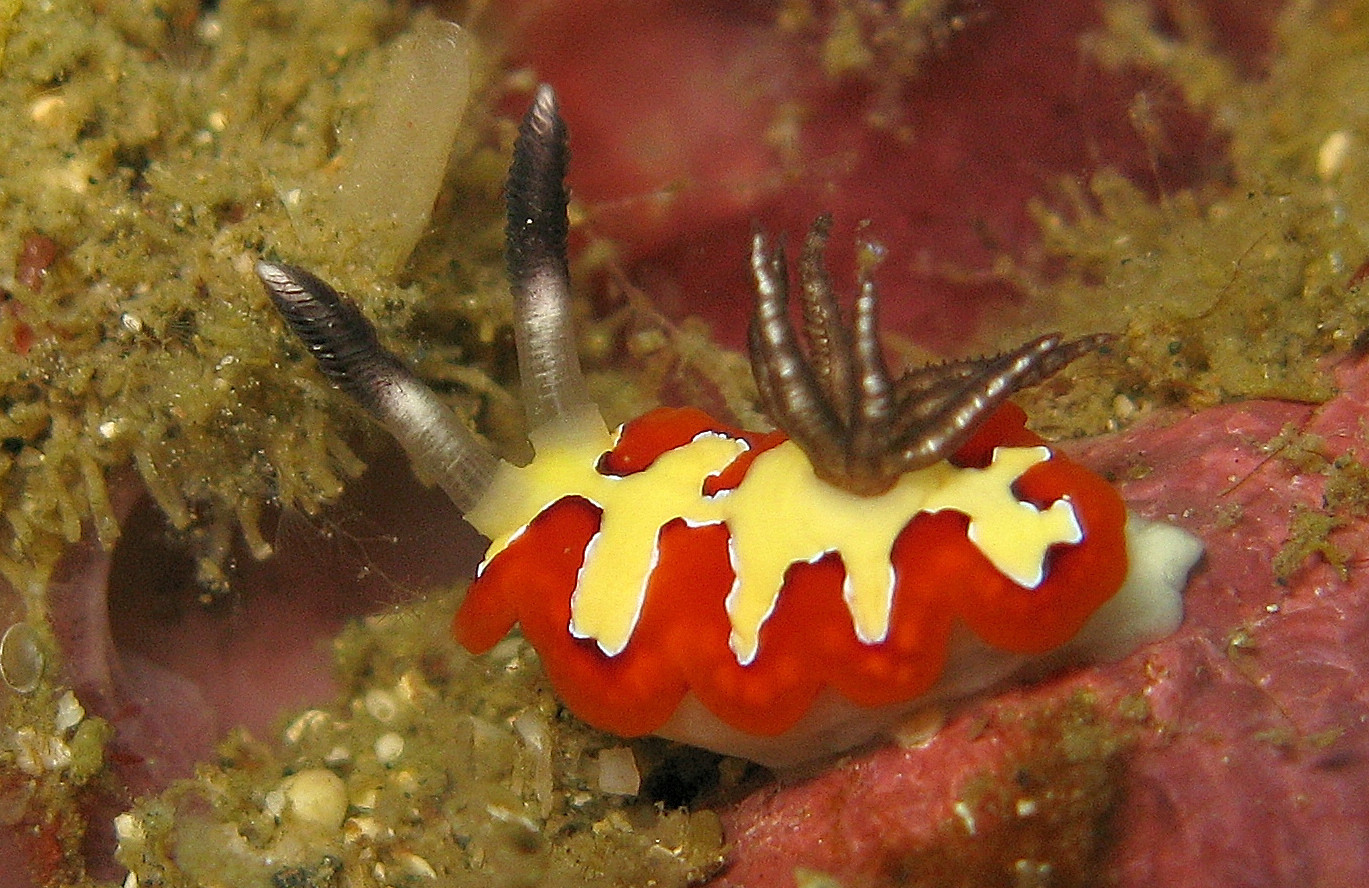
Goniobranchus fidelis

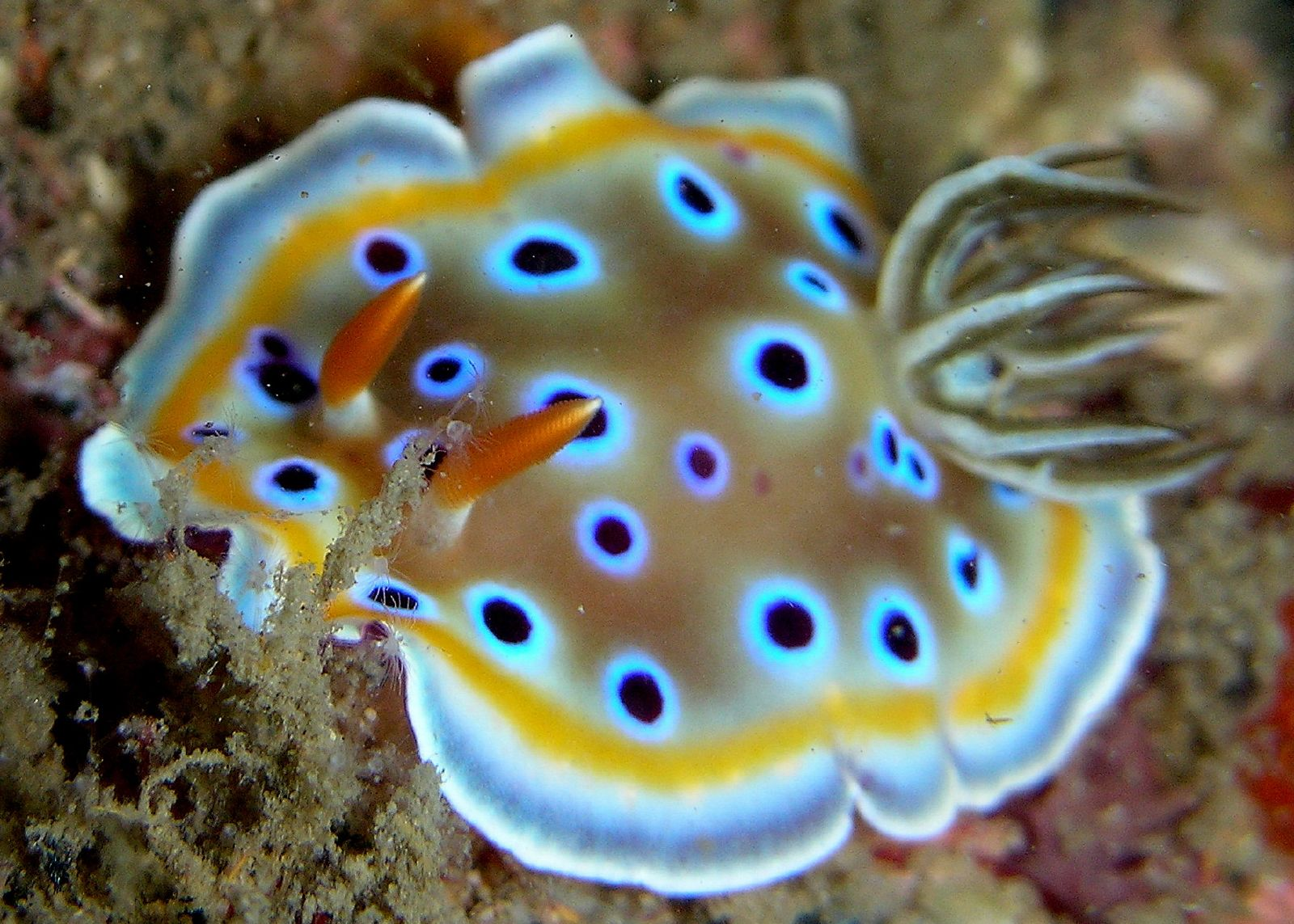
Goniobranchus geminus

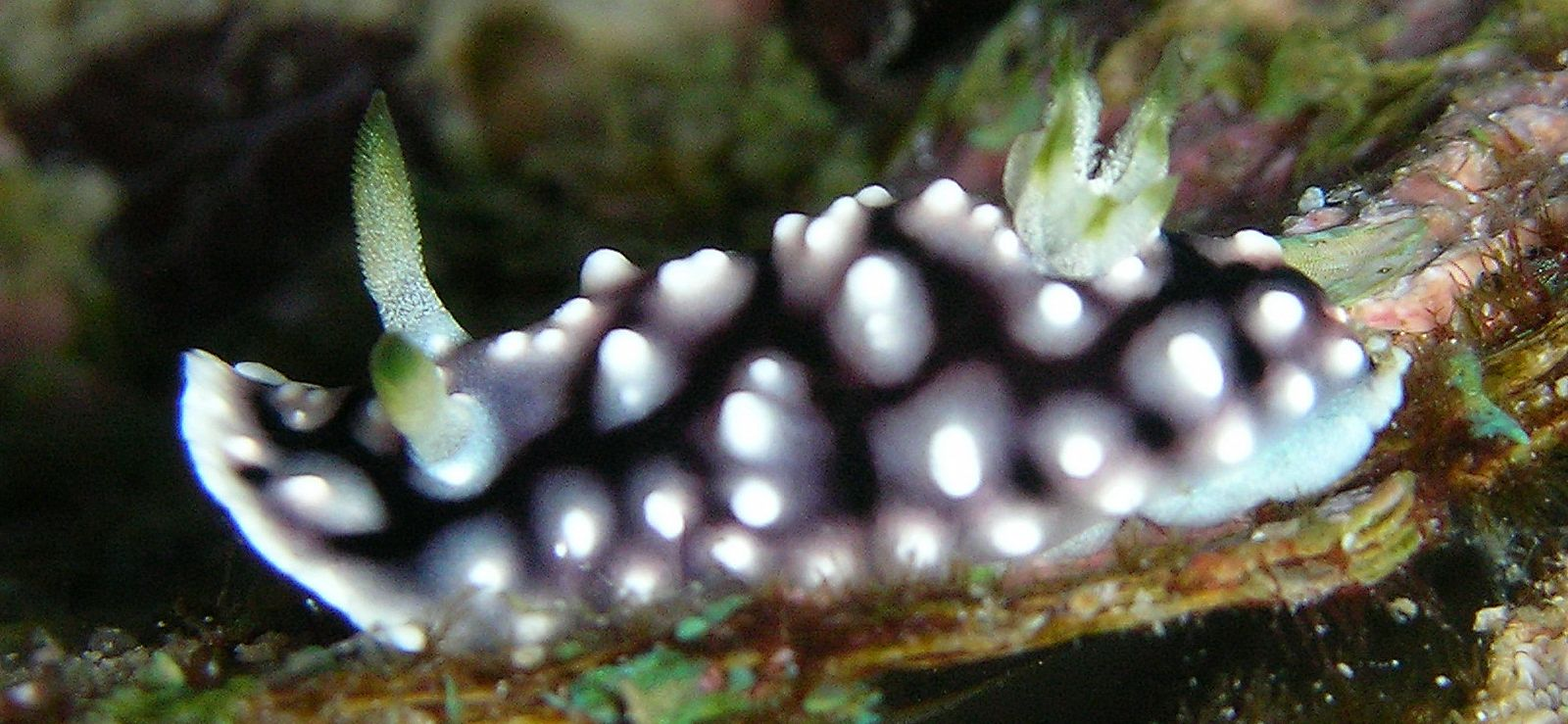
Goniobranchus geometricus

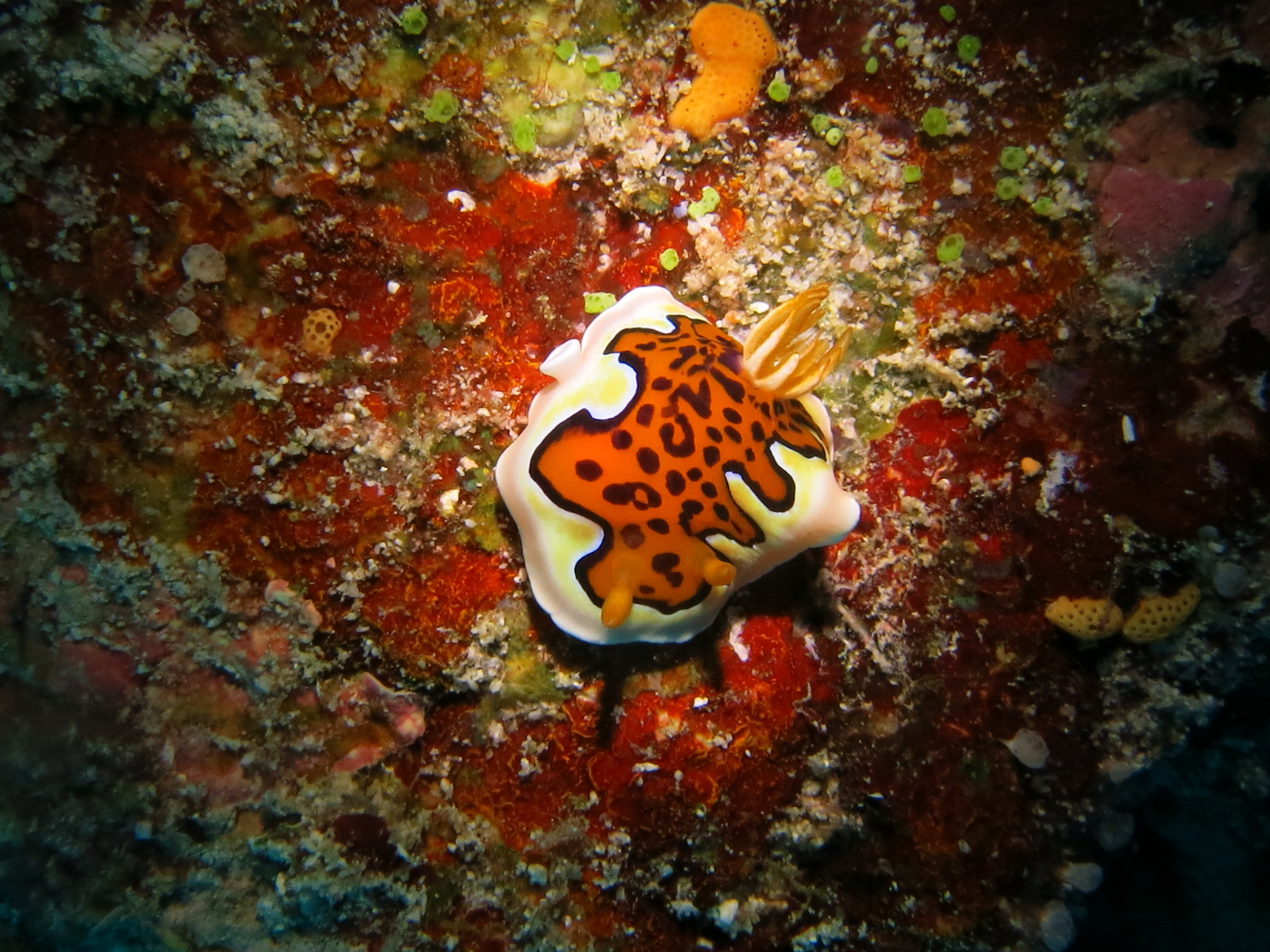
Goniobranchus gleniei

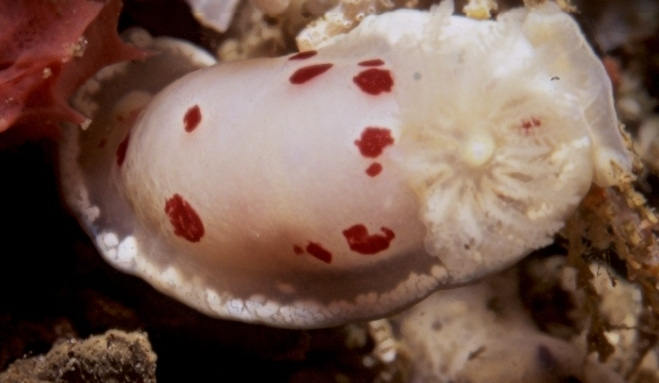
Goniobranchus heatherae

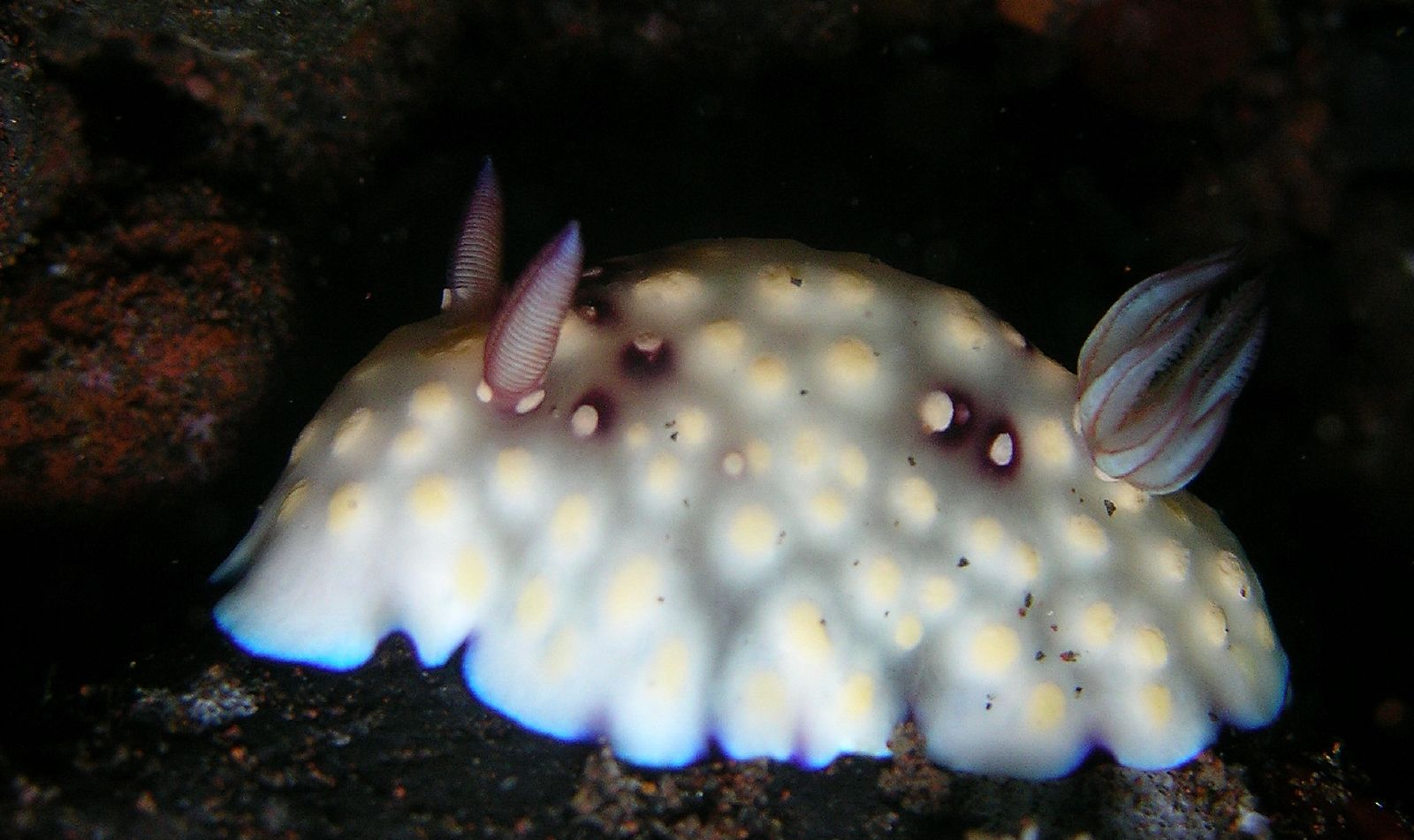
Goniobranchus hintuanensis

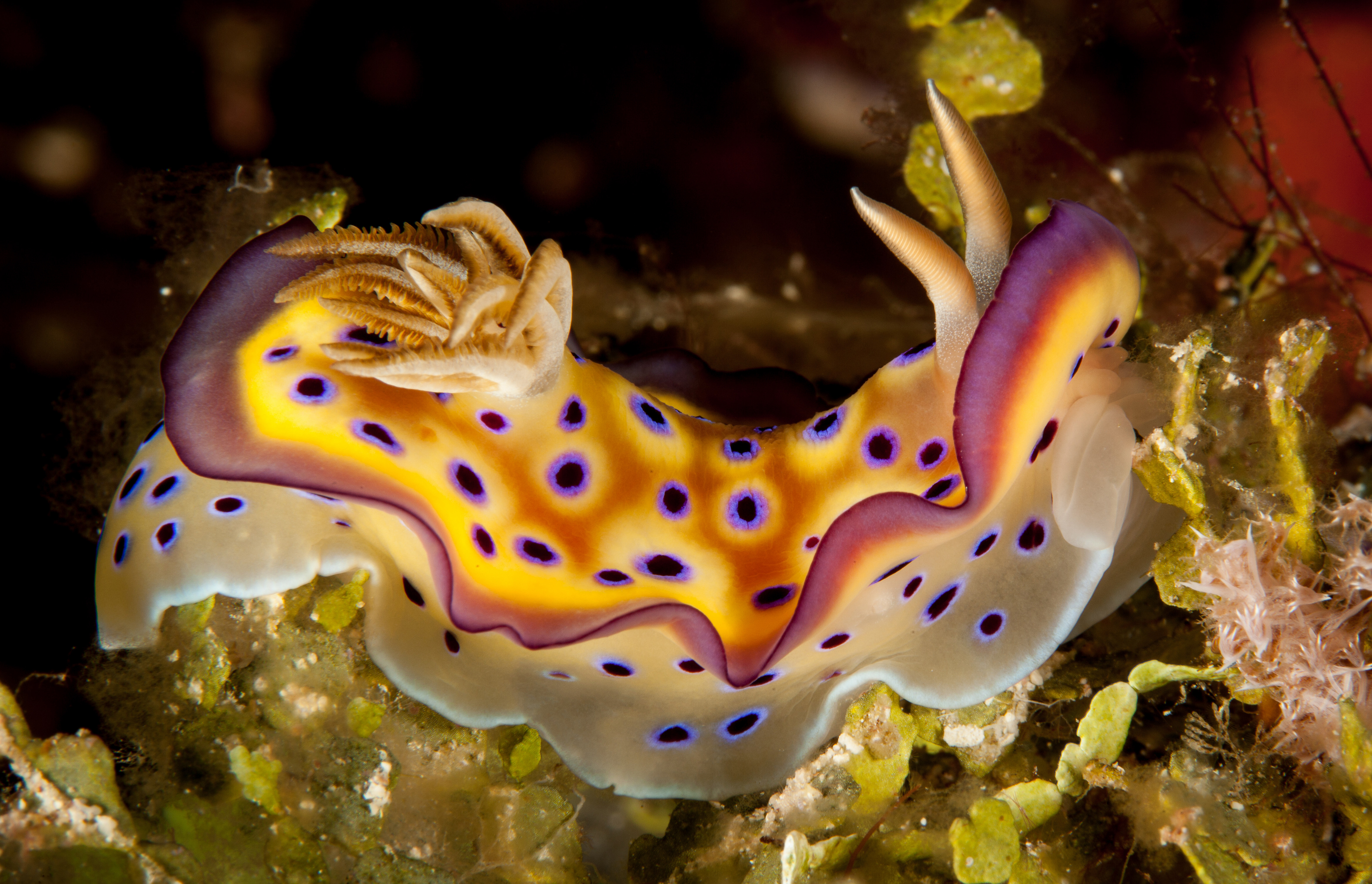
Goniobranchus kuniei

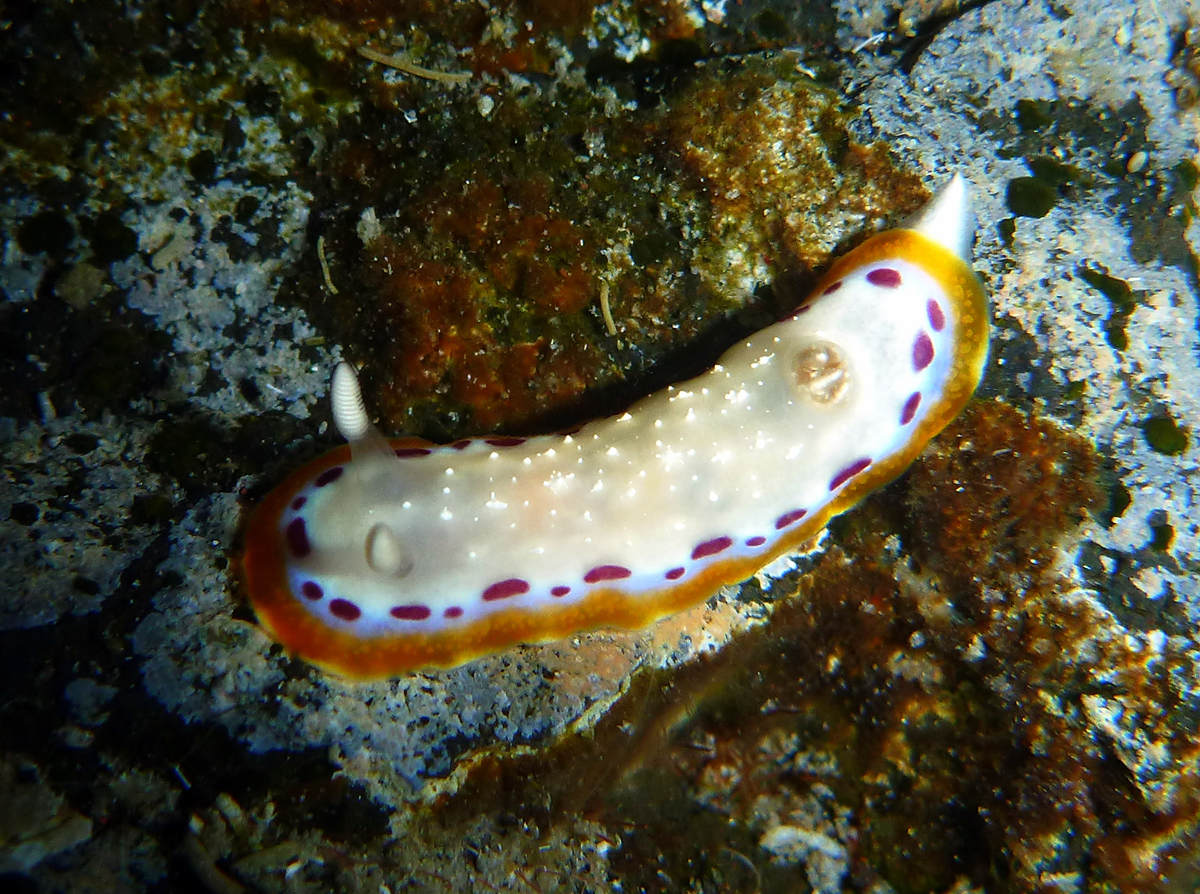
Goniobranchus lekker

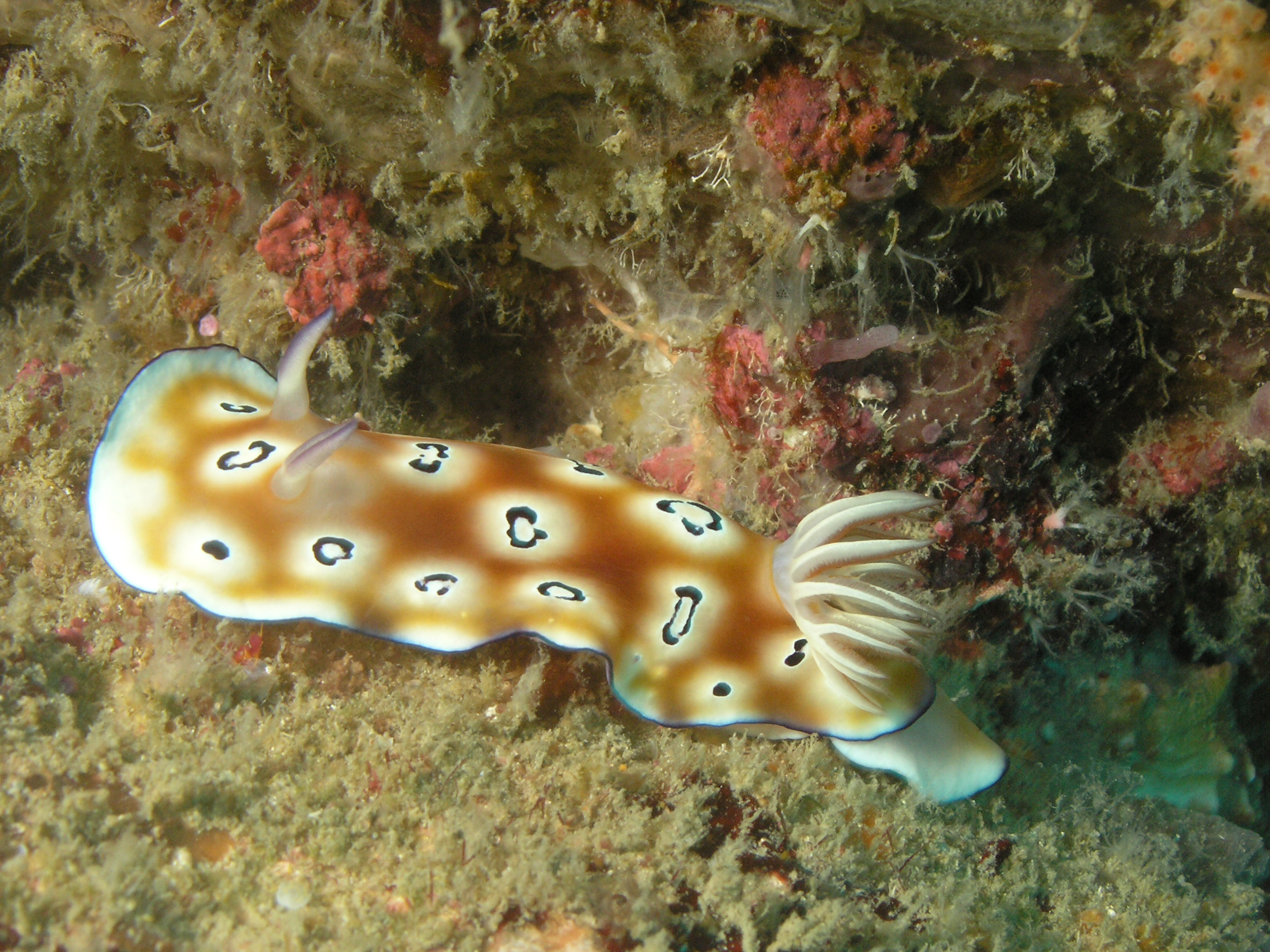
Goniobranchus leopardus

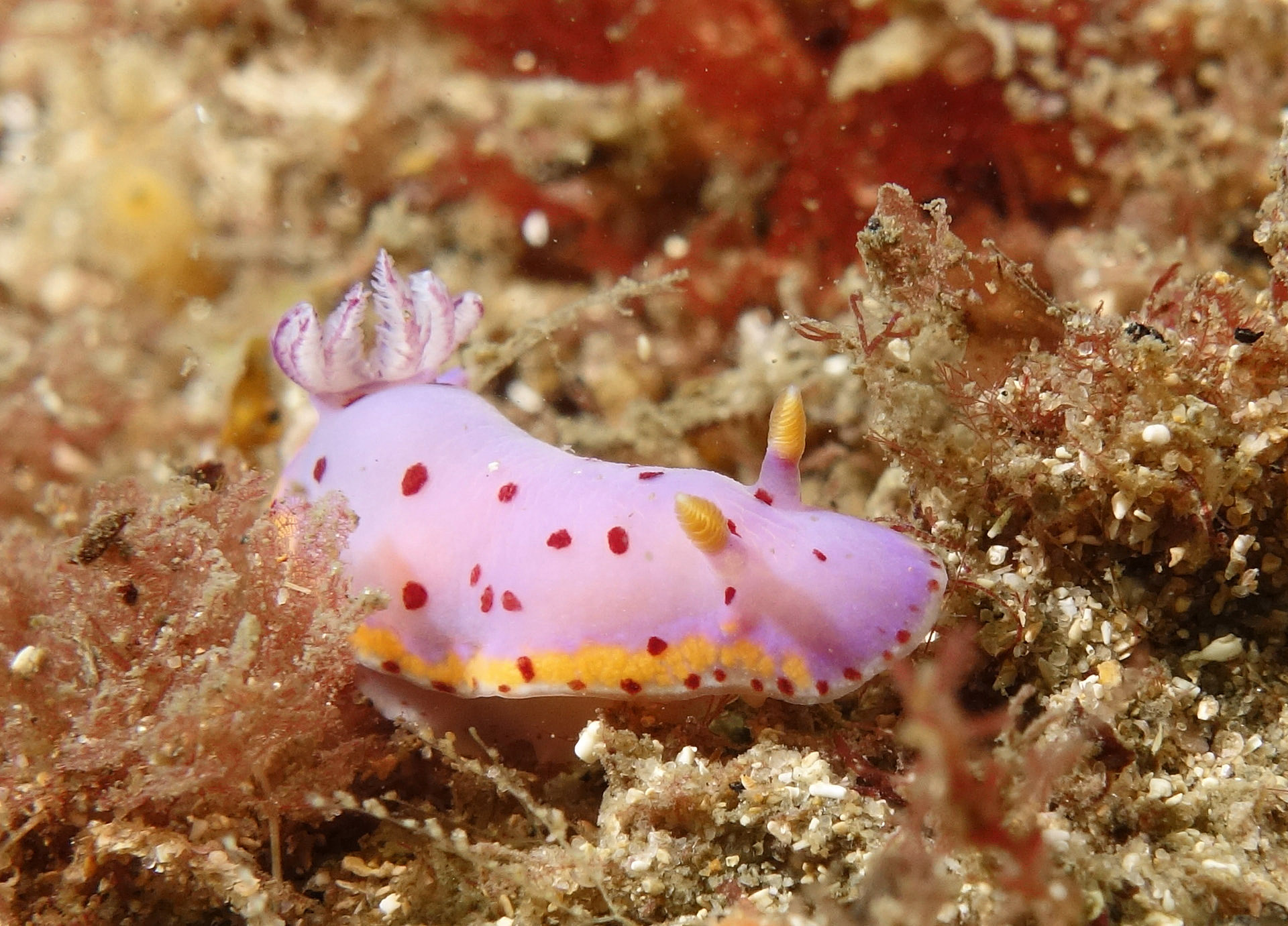
Goniobranchus loringi

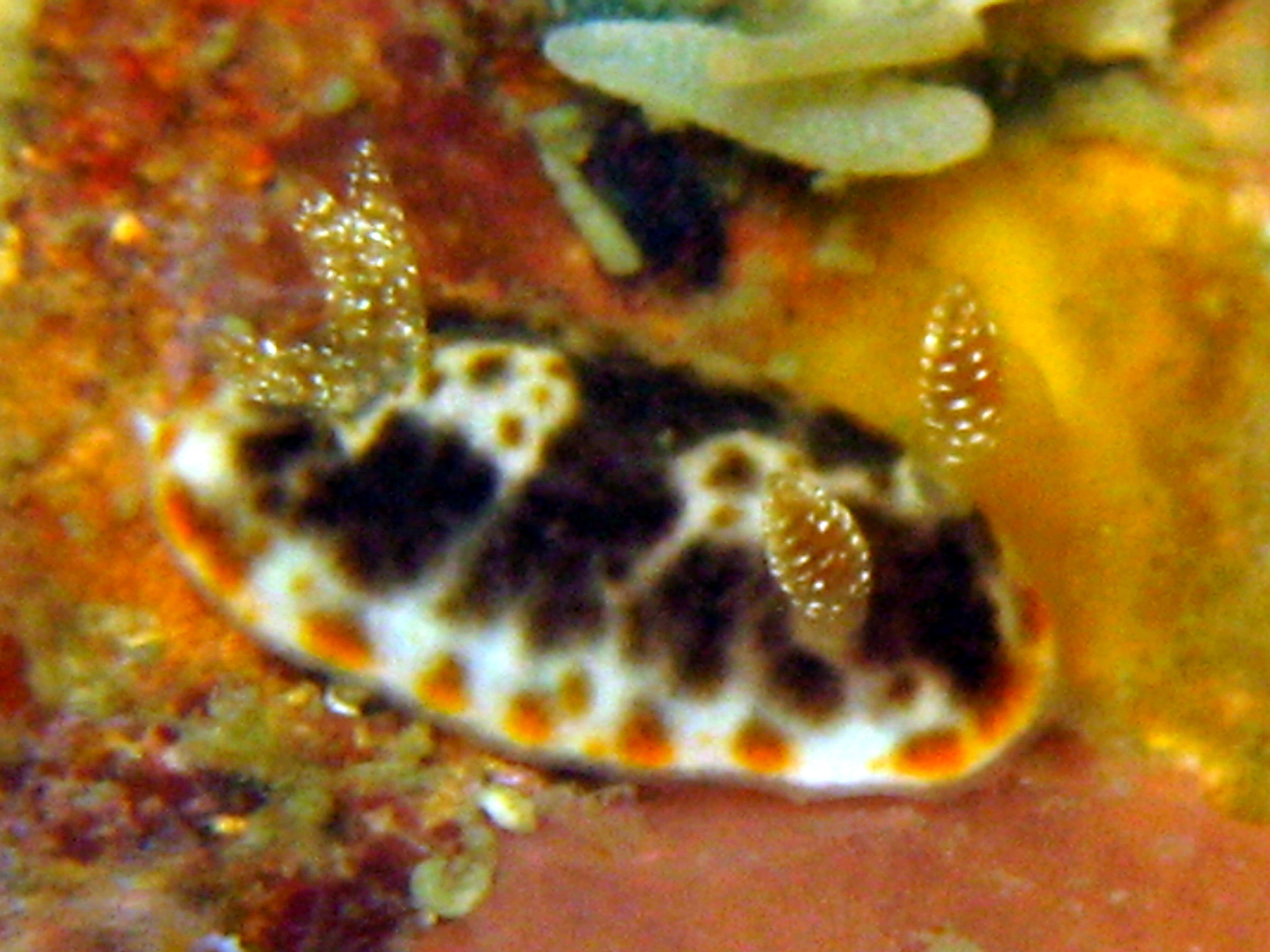
Goniobranchus mandapamensis

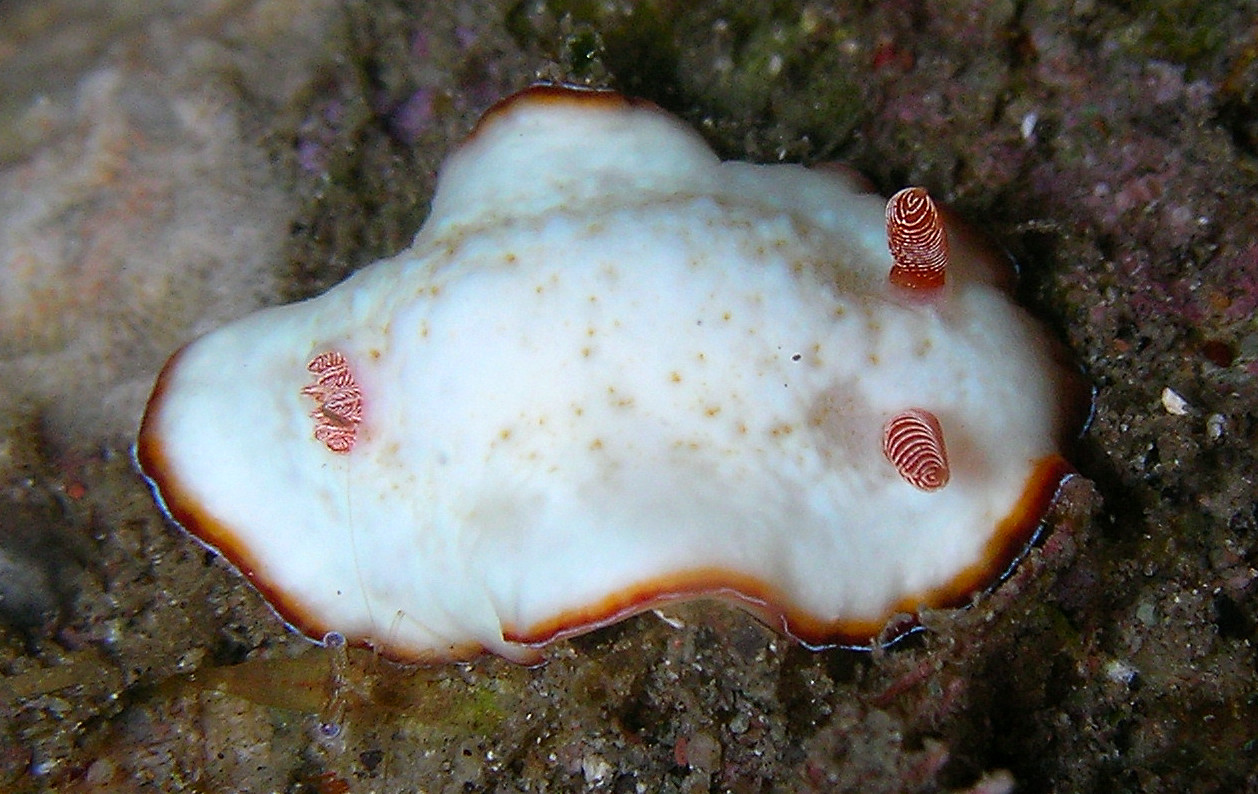
Goniobranchus preciosus

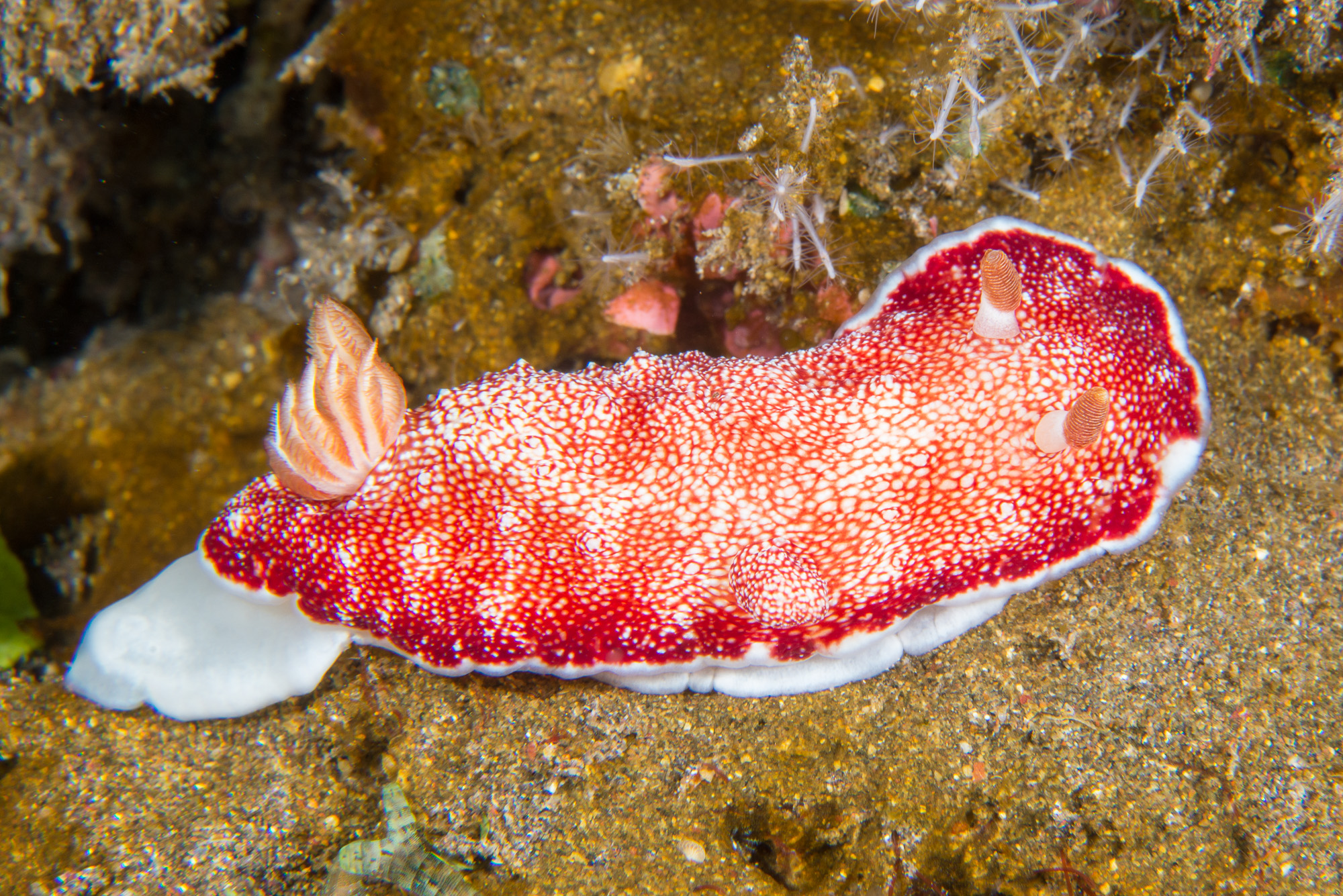
Goniobranchus reticulatus

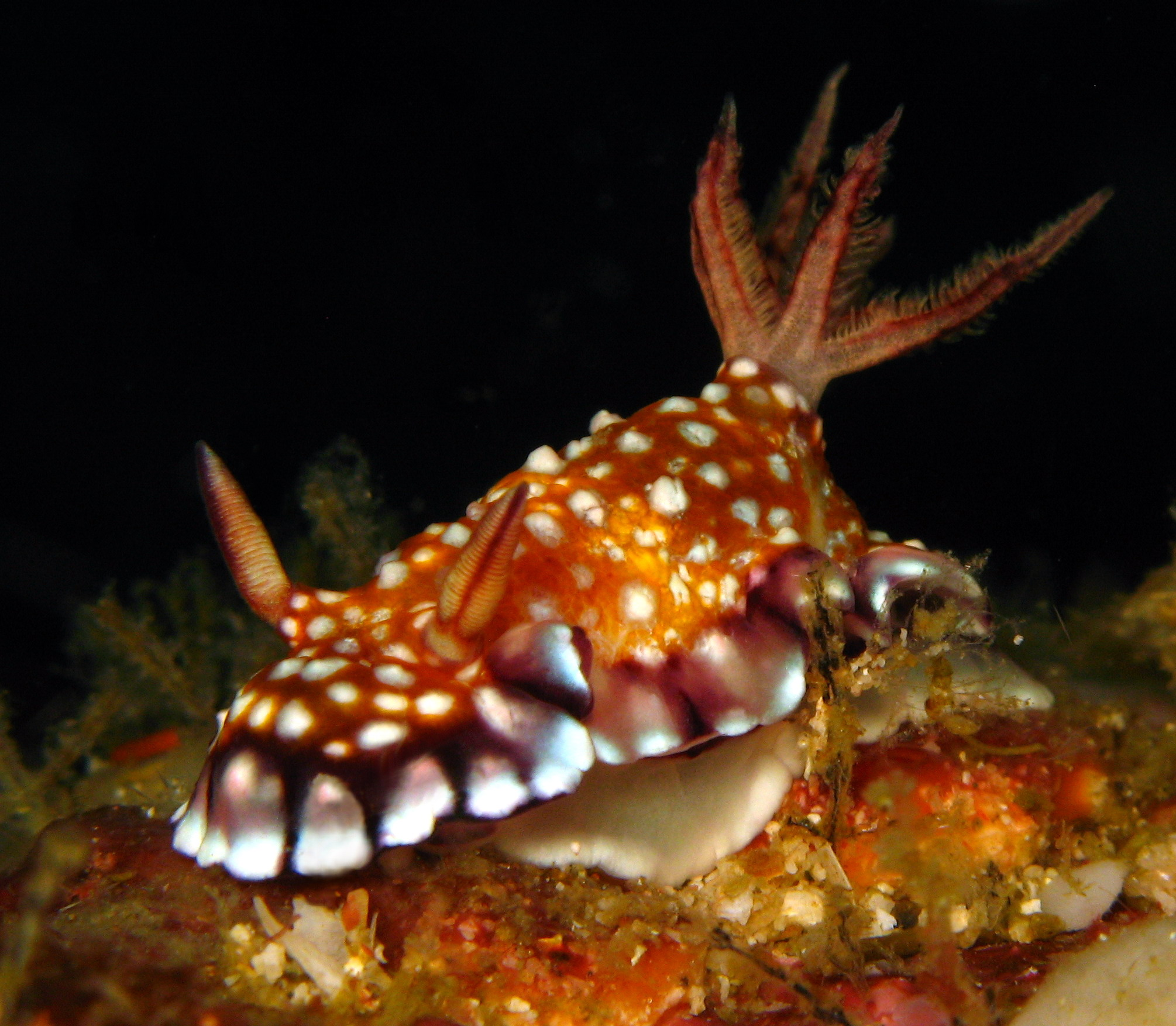
Goniobranchus cf. roboi

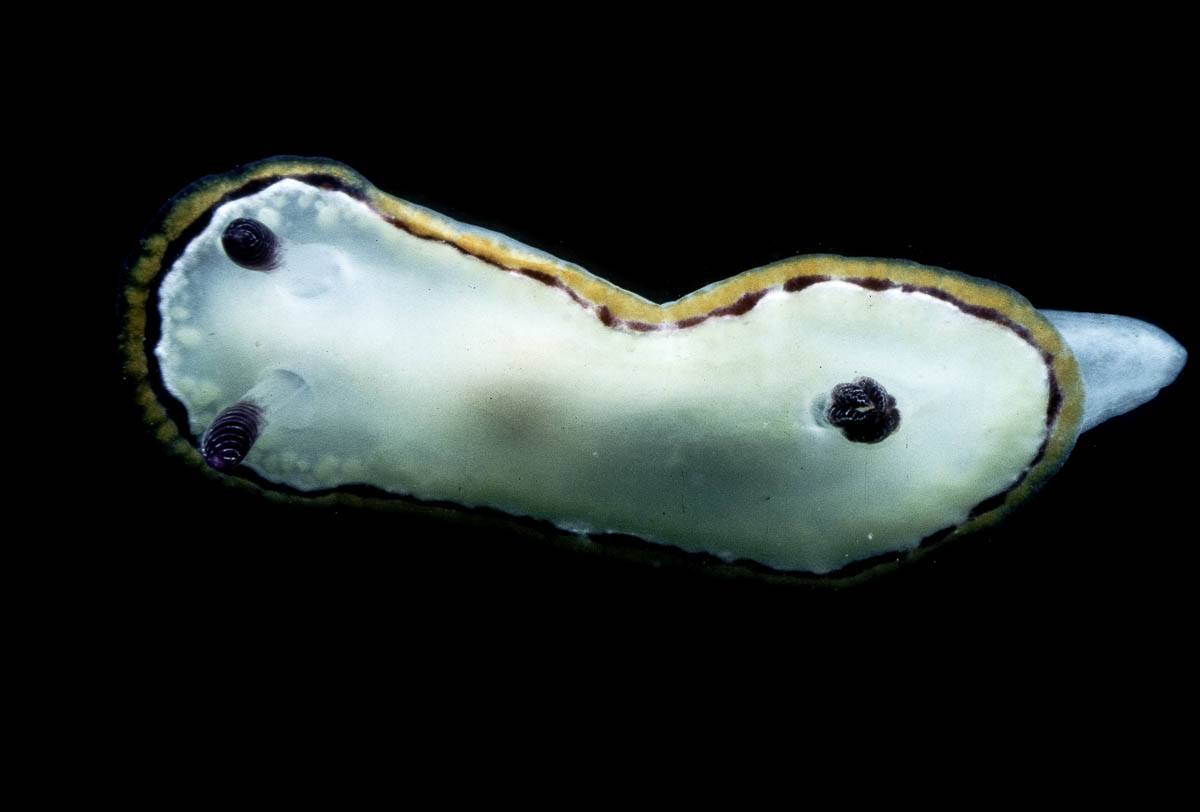
Goniobranchus rubrocornutus

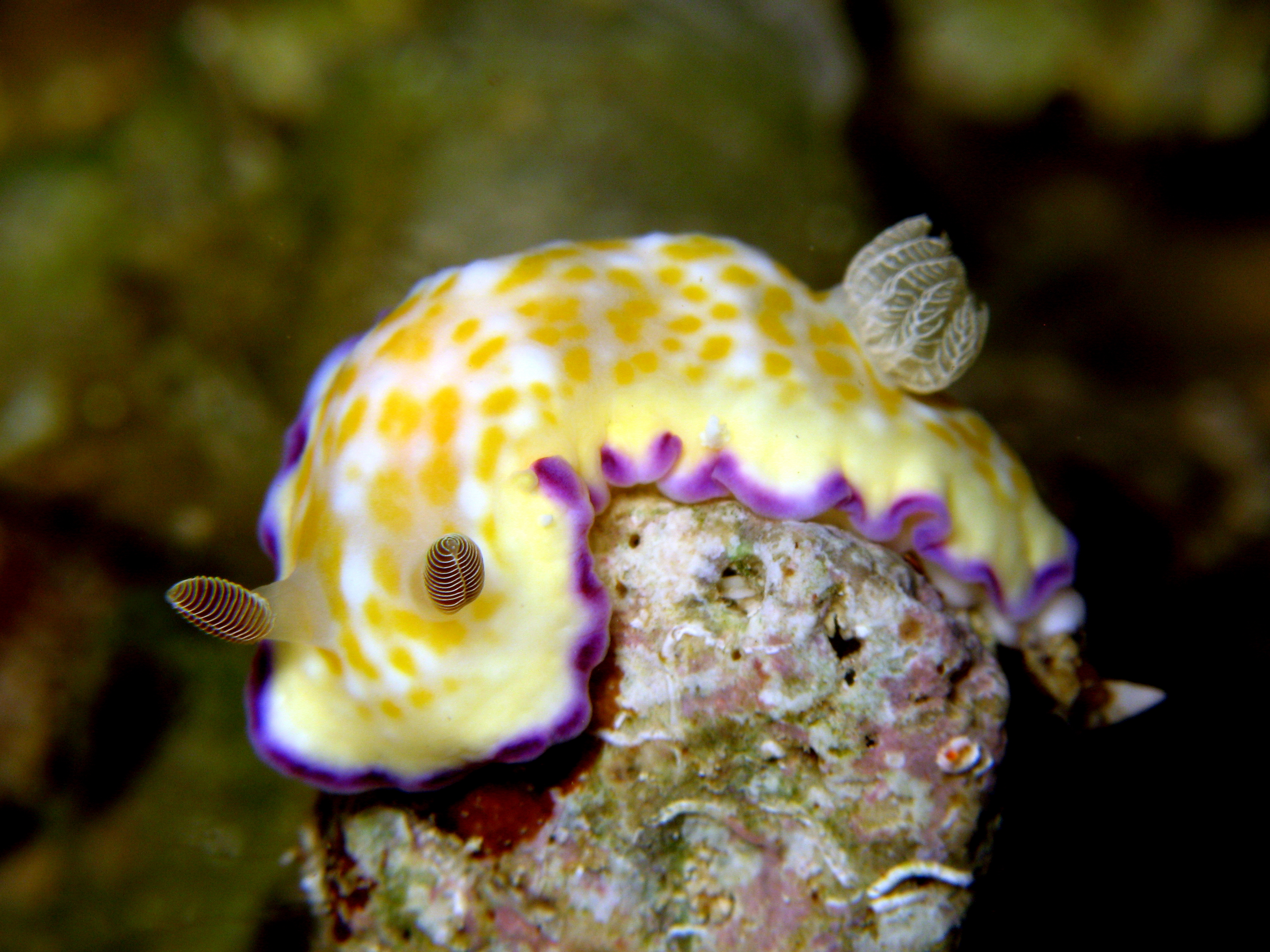
Goniobranchus rufomaculatus

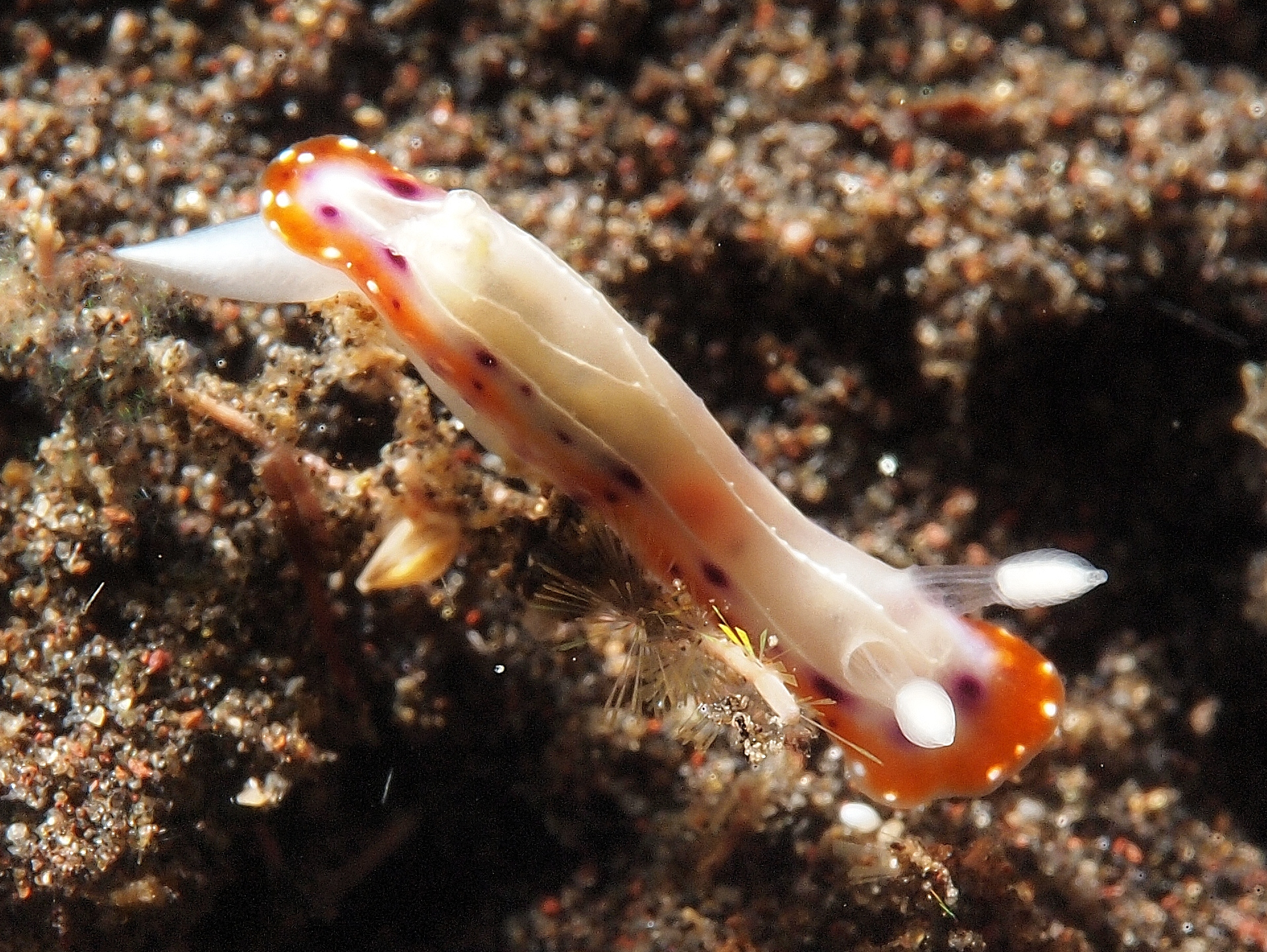
Goniobranchus setoensis

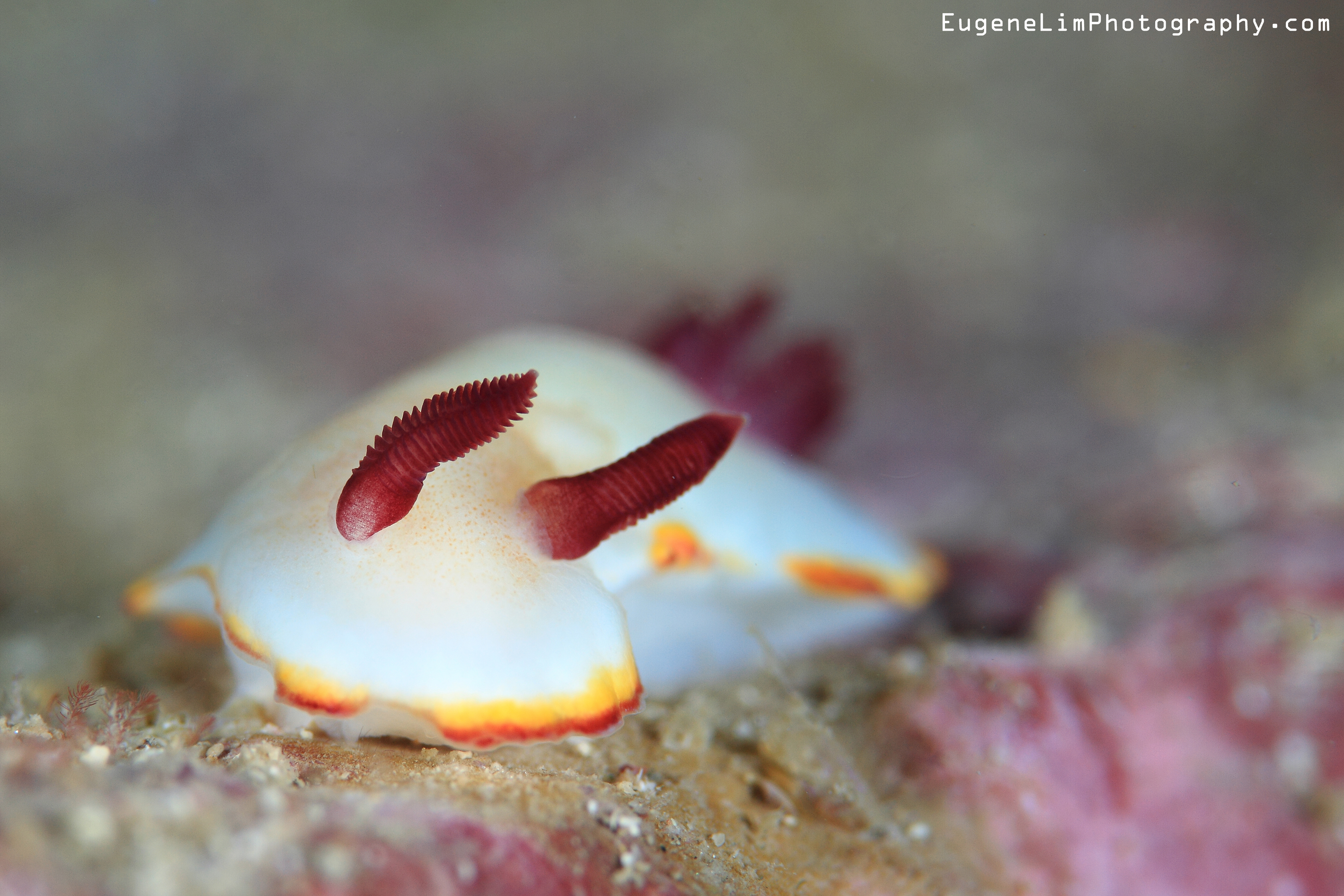
Goniobranchus sinensis

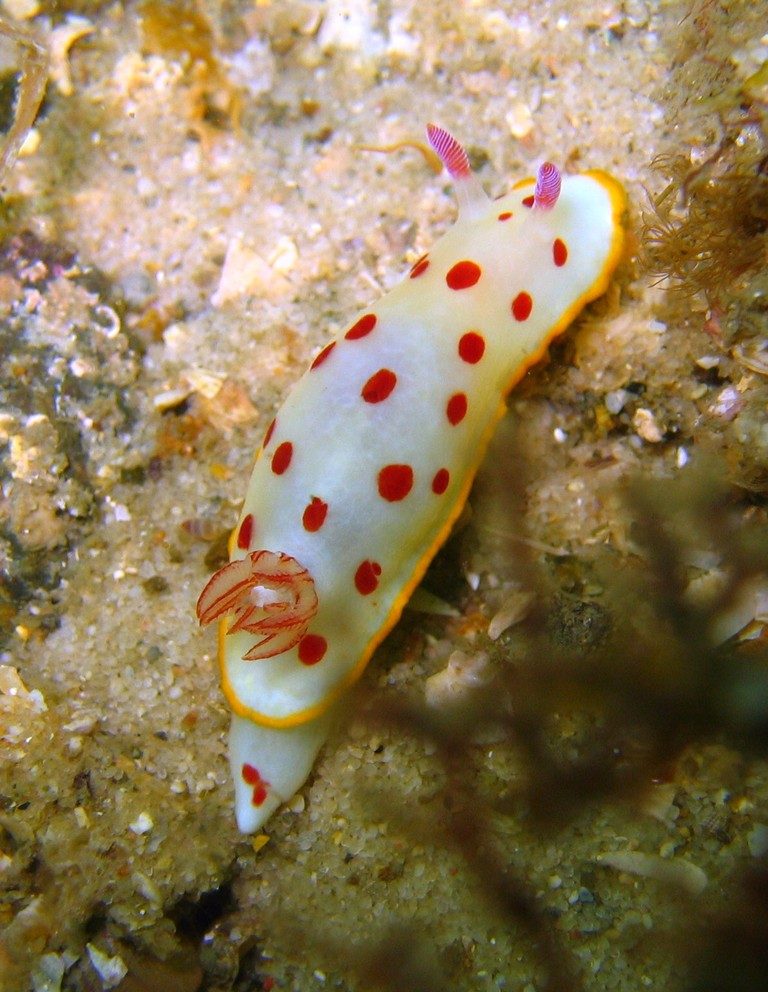
Goniobranchus splendidus

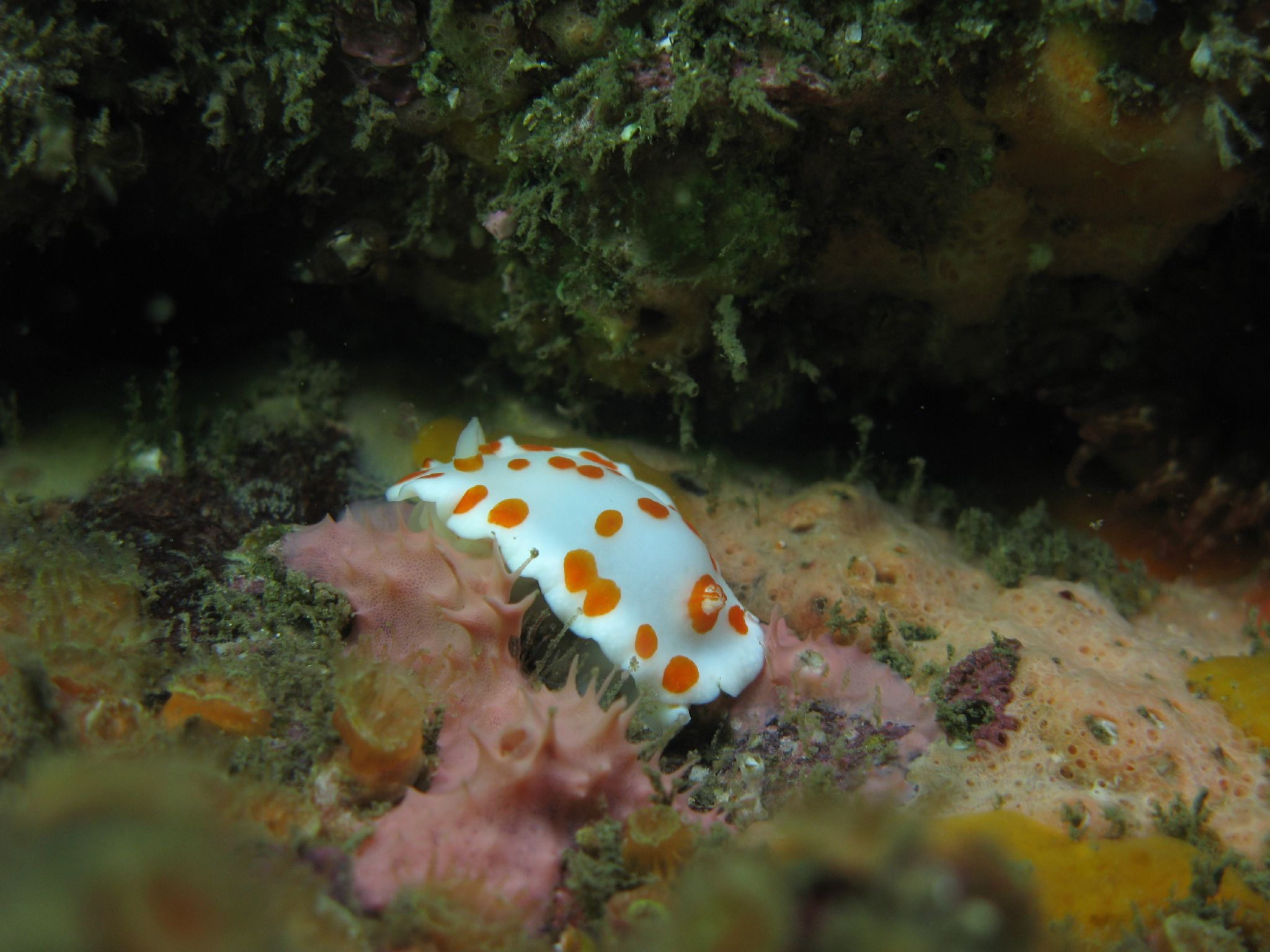
Goniobranchus tasmaniensis

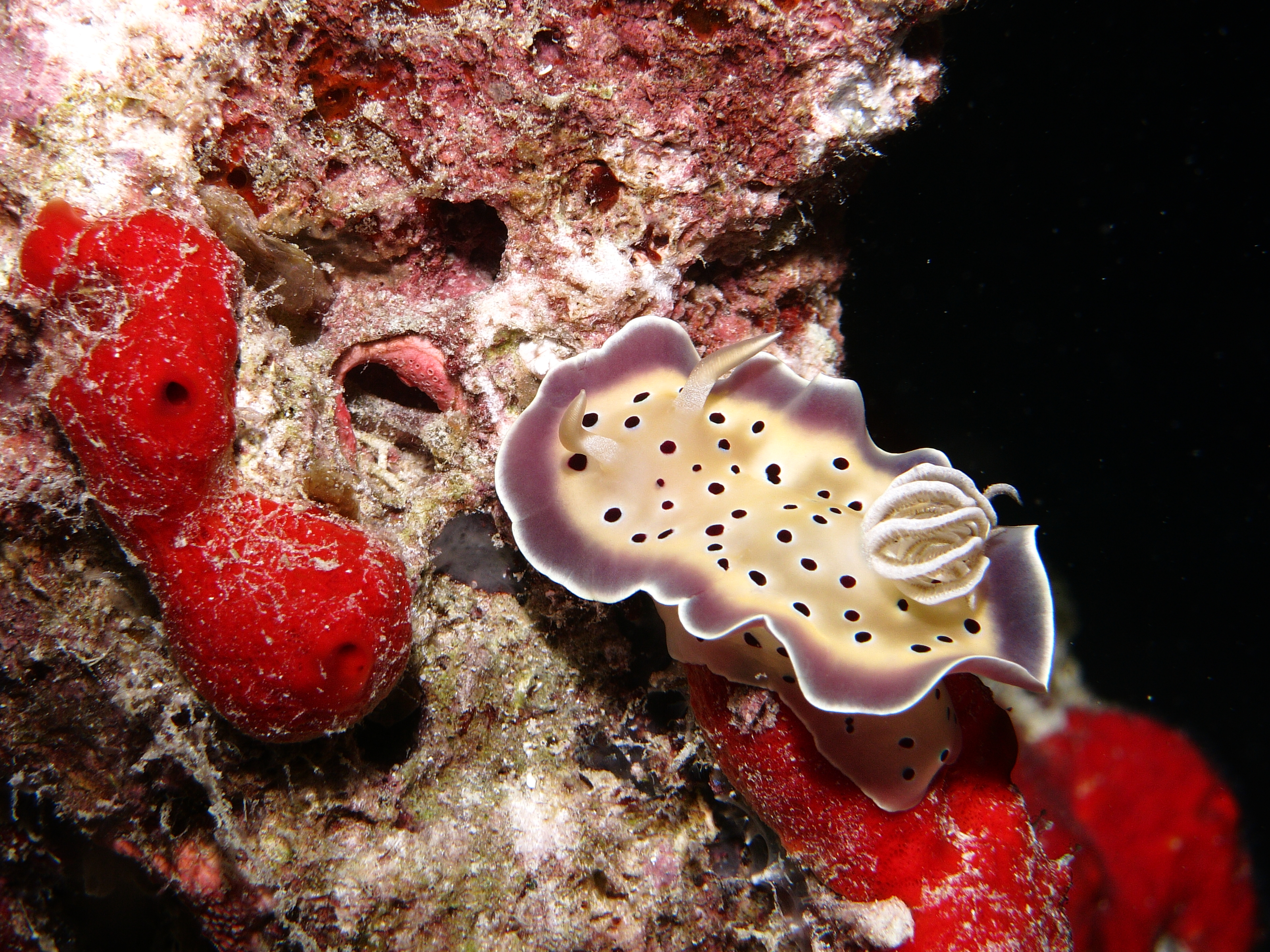
Goniobranchus tritos

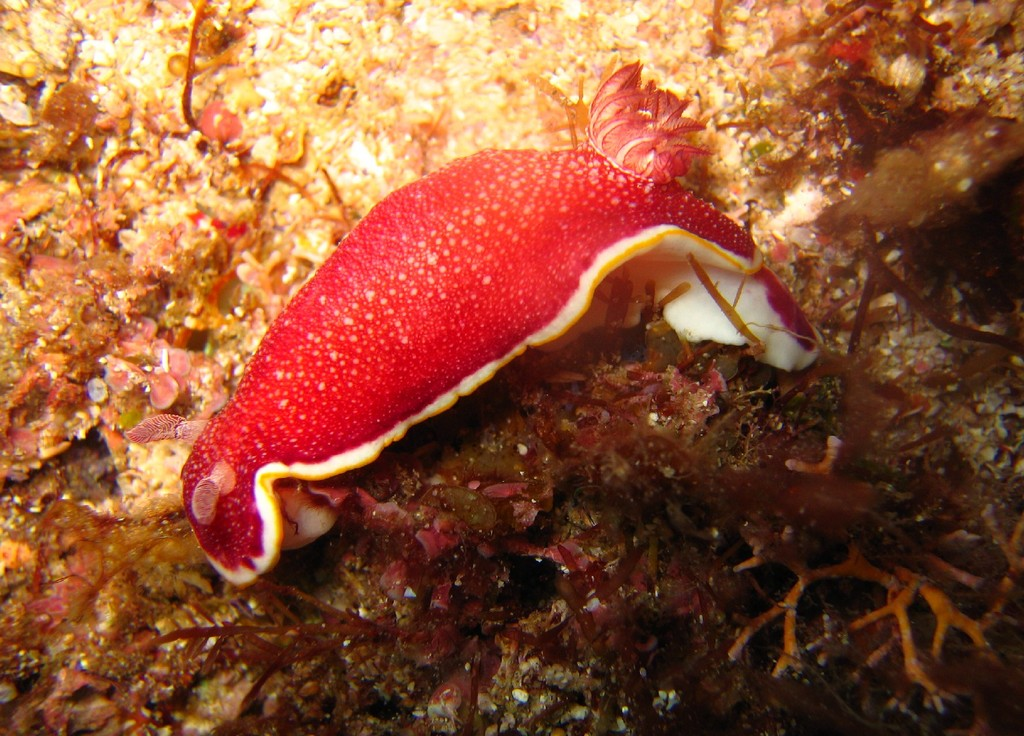
Goniobranchus tinctorius

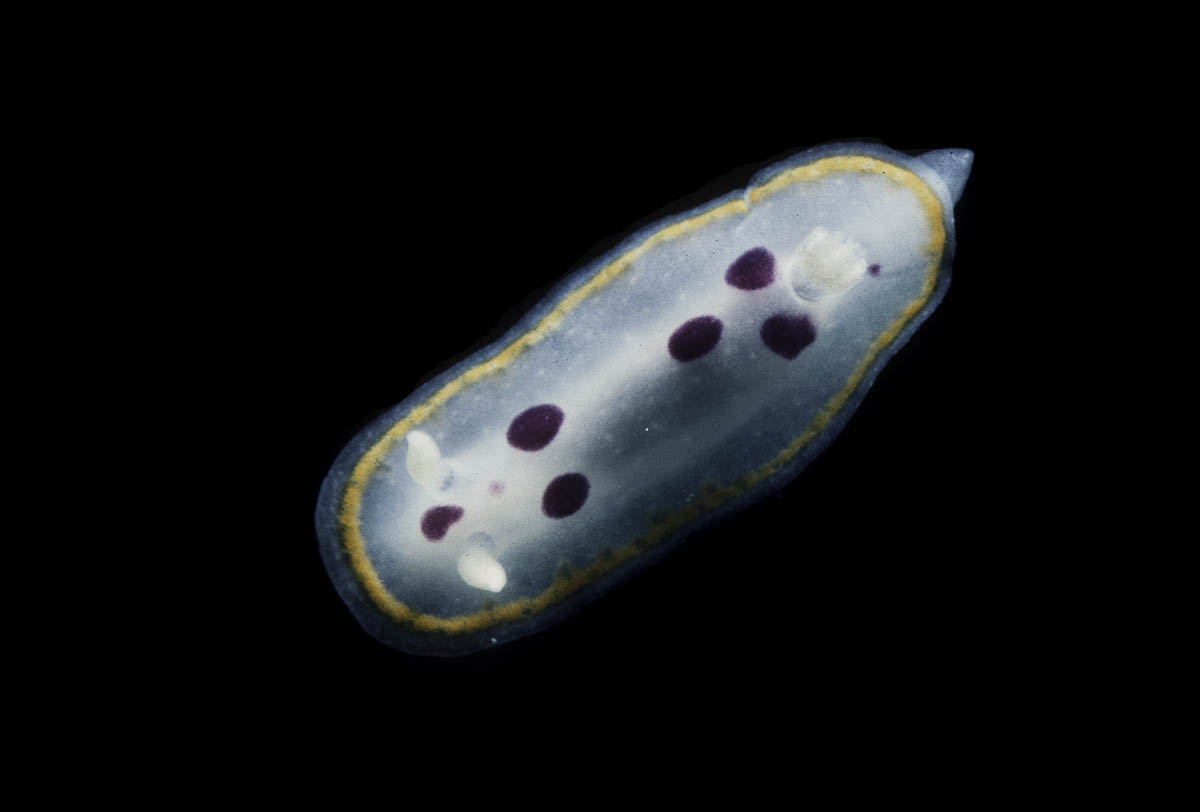
Goniobranchus tumuliferus

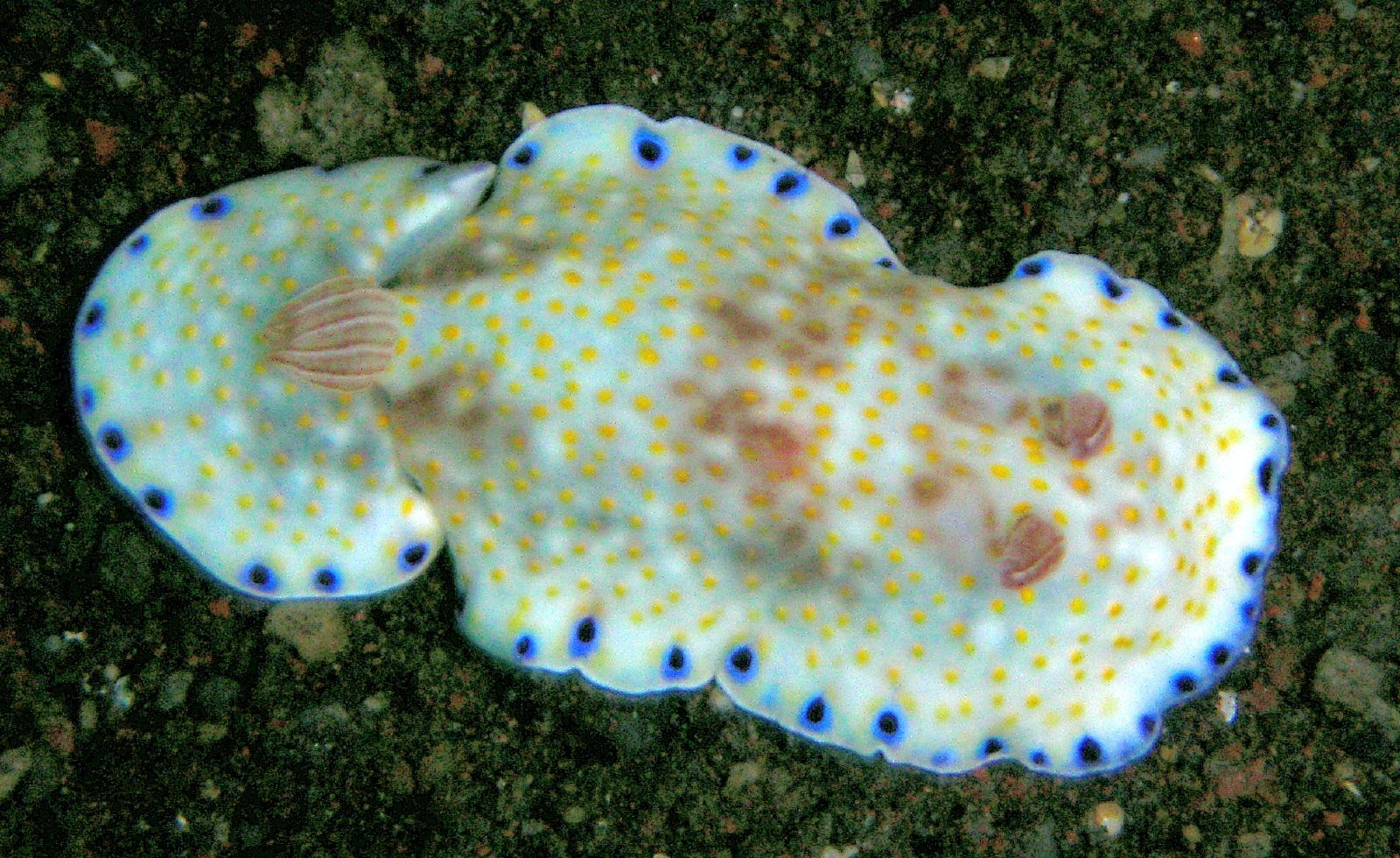
Goniobranchus variatus

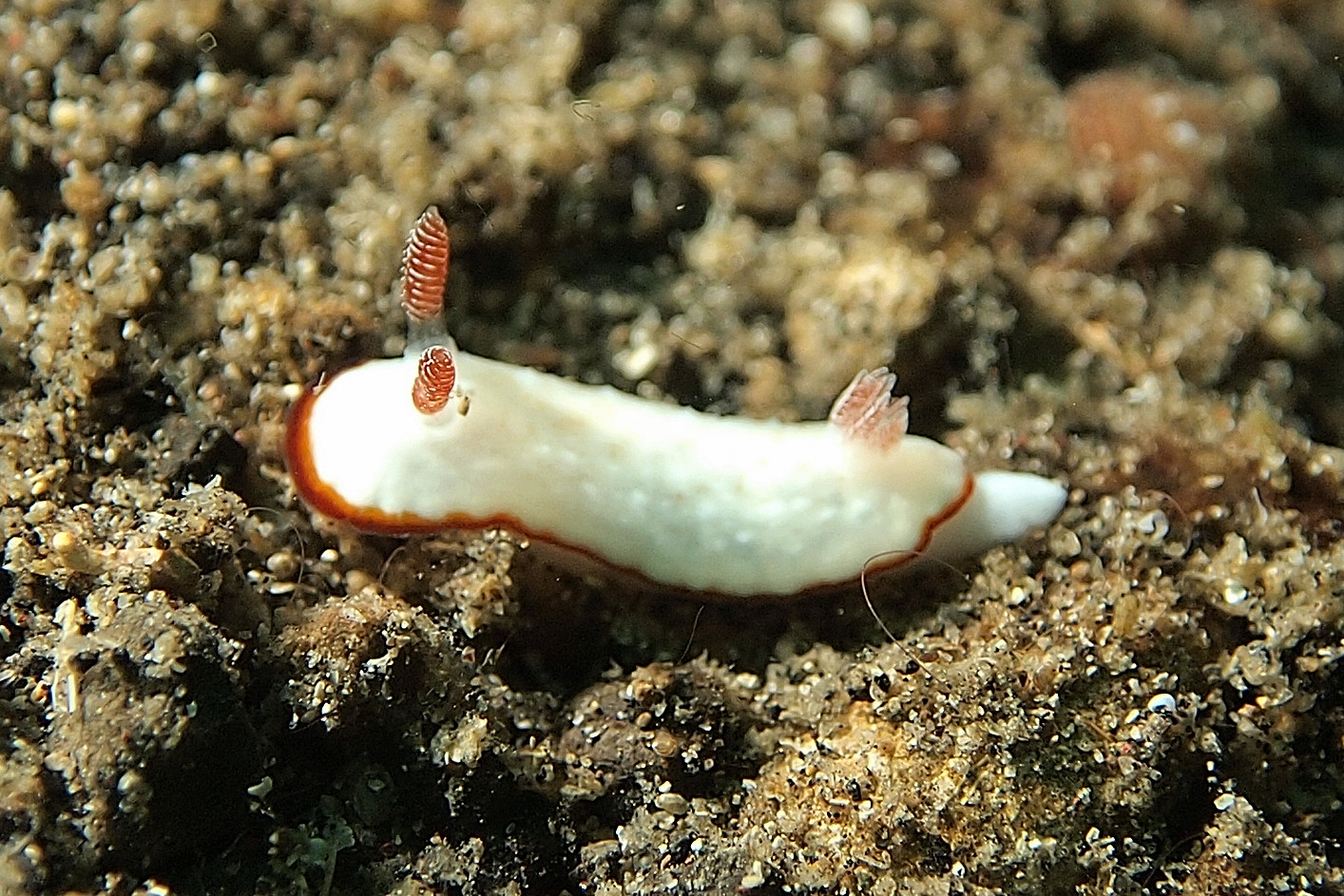
Goniobranchus verrieri

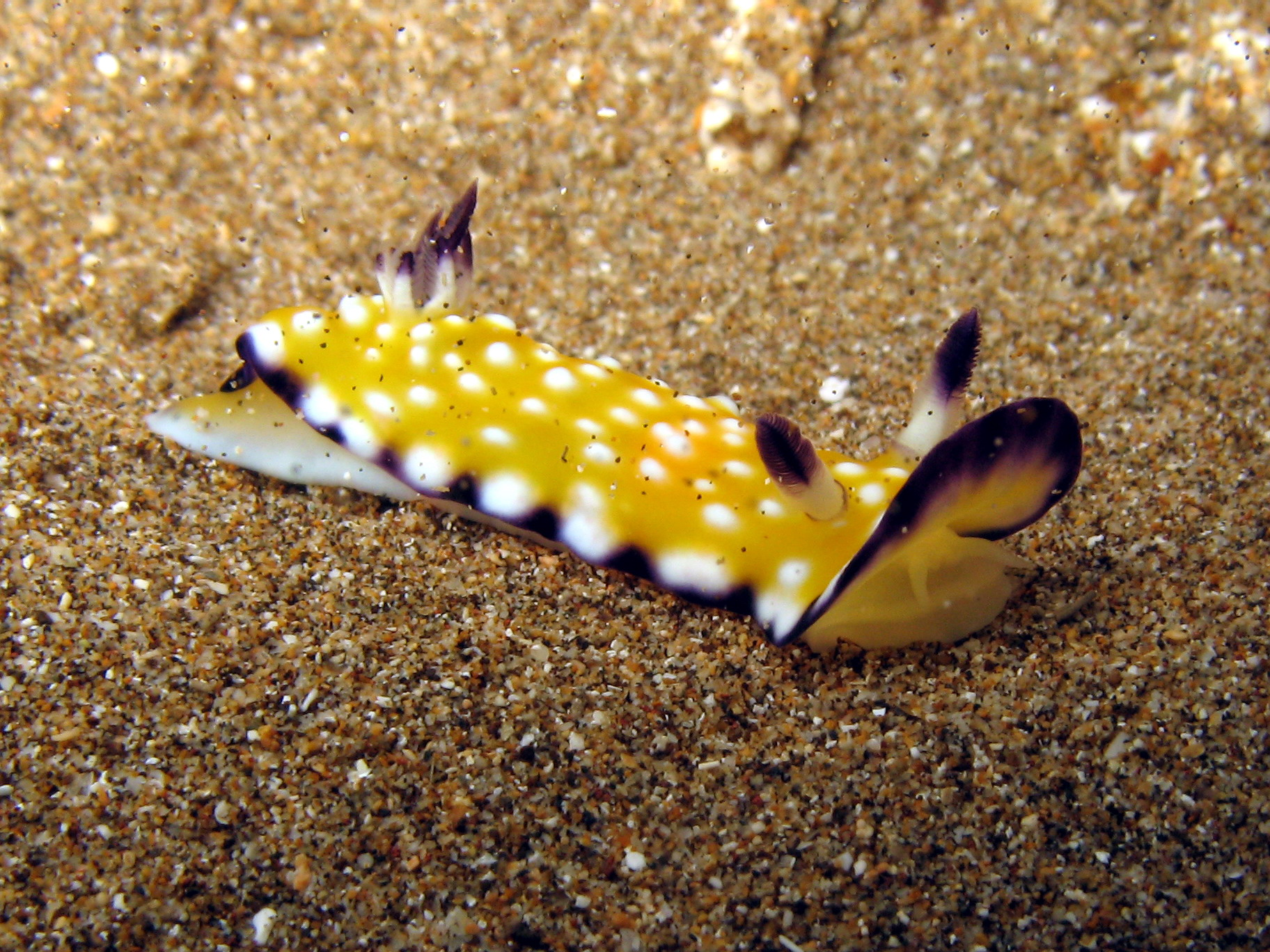
Goniobranchus vibratus
