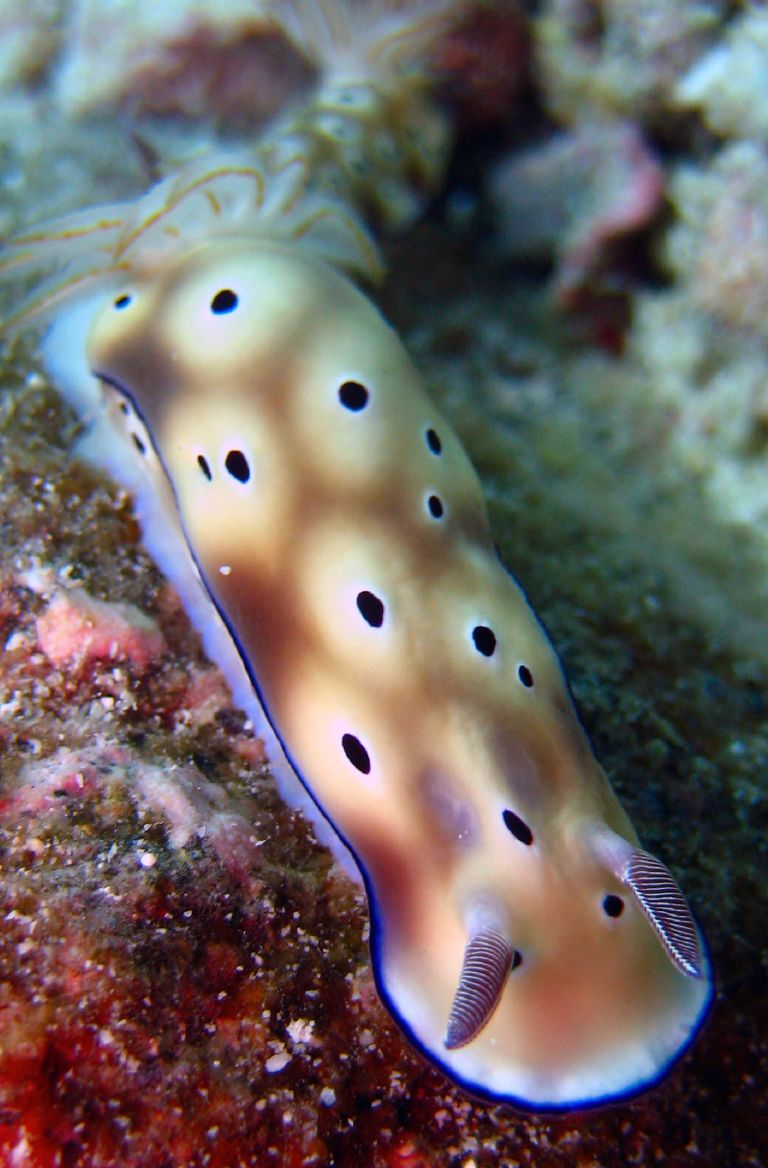

Scientific classification
- Kingdom: Animalia
- Phylum: Mollusca
- Class: Gastropoda
- Order: Nudibranchia
- Family: Chromodorididae
- Genus: Hypselodoris
- Species: H. tryoni

Binomial name
- Hypselodoris tryoni (Garrett, 1873)

Synonyms
- Chromodoris odhneri (Risbec, 1953); Chromodoris tryoni (Garrett, 1873); Goniodoris tryoni Garrett, 1873 (basionym); Jeanrisbecia francoisi (Odhner, 1934); Risbecia francoisi Odhner, 1934; Risbecia odhneri Risbec, 1953; Risbecia tryoni (Garrett, 1873)

= Hypselodoris tryoni =

Species of gastropod

Hypselodoris tryoni is a species of sea slug, a dorid nudibranch, a marine gastropod mollusk in the genus Chromodorididae.

== Taxonomic history ==
The decision to include Risbecia species within the family Hypselodoris was made on the basis of a molecular (DNA) study which showed that Risbecia species are a clade inside the genus Hypselodoris as currently constituted.

== Distribution ==
This species was described from the Society Islands. It is reported to occur widely in the tropical Western Pacific Ocean from Australia to the Philippines.

== Description ==
Hypselodoris tryoni has a brown body and white foot. The body and upper dorsum are covered in purple spots ringed with white or light-brown. The gills are typically translucent white or light-brown and the rhinophores are brown to dark-brown and covered in circular white lines. It has a thin blue or purple line on the mantle edge. There is some colour variation between individuals. Hypselodoris tryoni is similar in appearance to Goniobranchus geminus, Goniobranchus kuniei and Goniobranchus leopardus, although it lacks the wide purple mantle edge line present in those species. Goniobranchus species also tend to have a lower, more rounded body. Sea slugs such as Hypselodoris tryoni, are known to exhibit trailing behaviour where up to four animals will follow one another very closely, often touching. It is not known what causes this behaviour.

Hypselodoris tryoni reaches at least 60 mm in length and has been observed to raise and lower its head while crawling.

== Ecology ==
Like many slugs in the genus Chromodorididae, Risbecia tryoni feeds on sponges and have been seen feeding on sponges from the family Dysidea. When feeding they are sometimes accompanied by a group of shrimp, Periclimenes imperator, in an apparent form of commensalism.

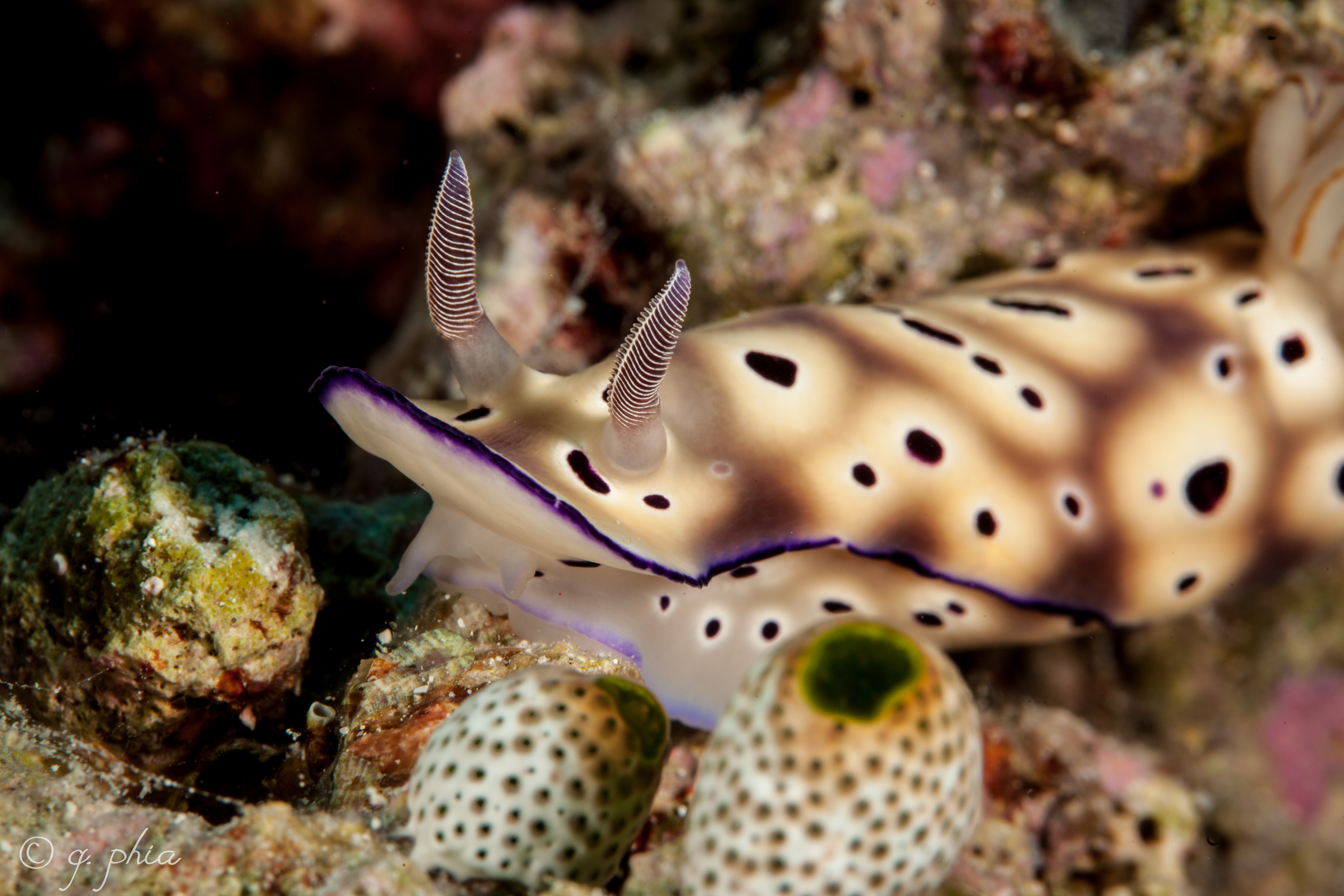
Hypselodoris tryoni in Wakatobi National Park, 2018

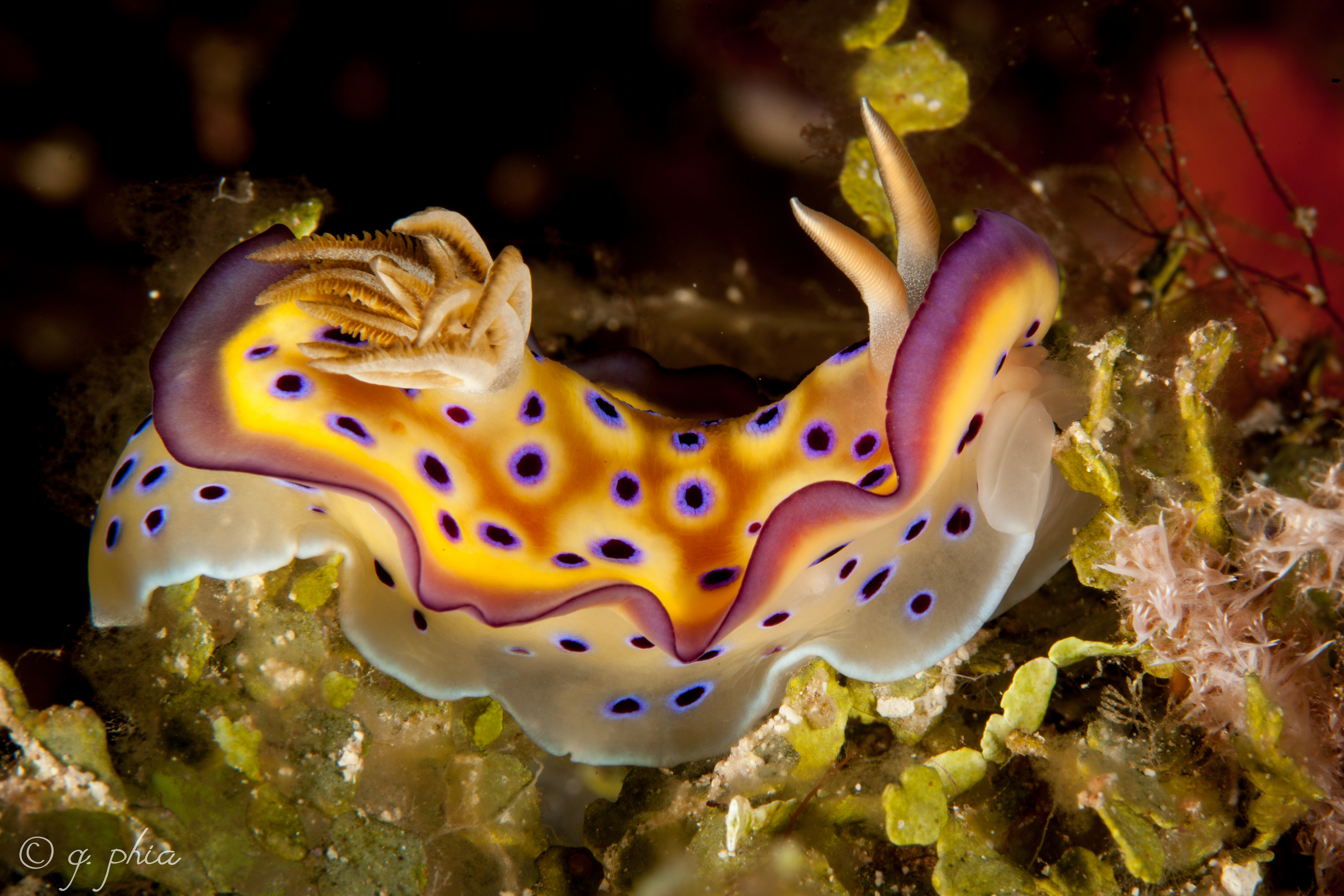
Hypselodoris tryoni in Wakatobi National Park, 2018

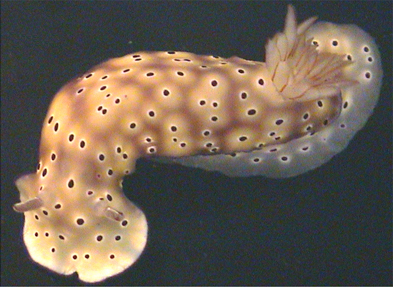
Hypselodoris tryoni

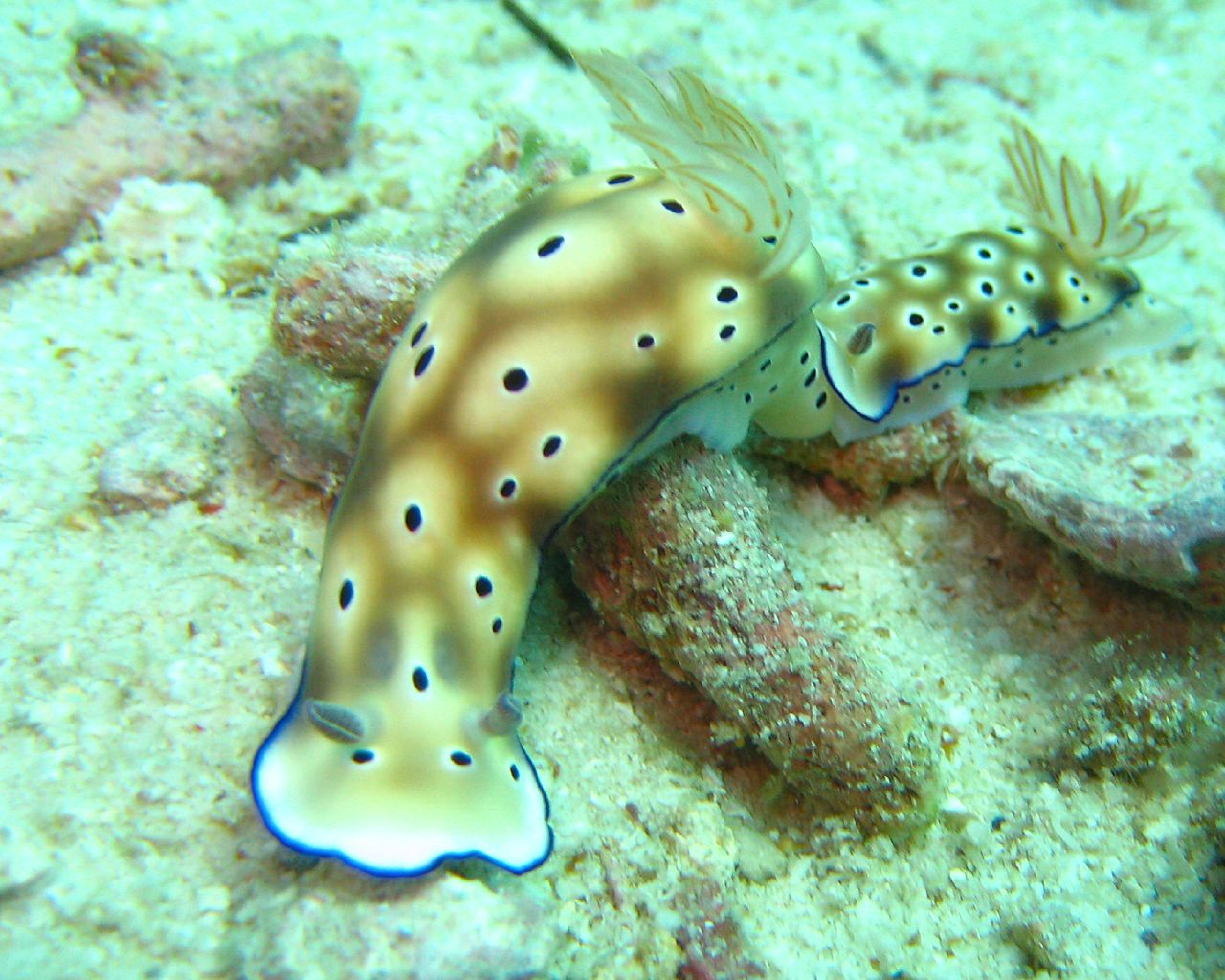
Hypselodoris tryoni exhibiting "trailing" behaviour.
