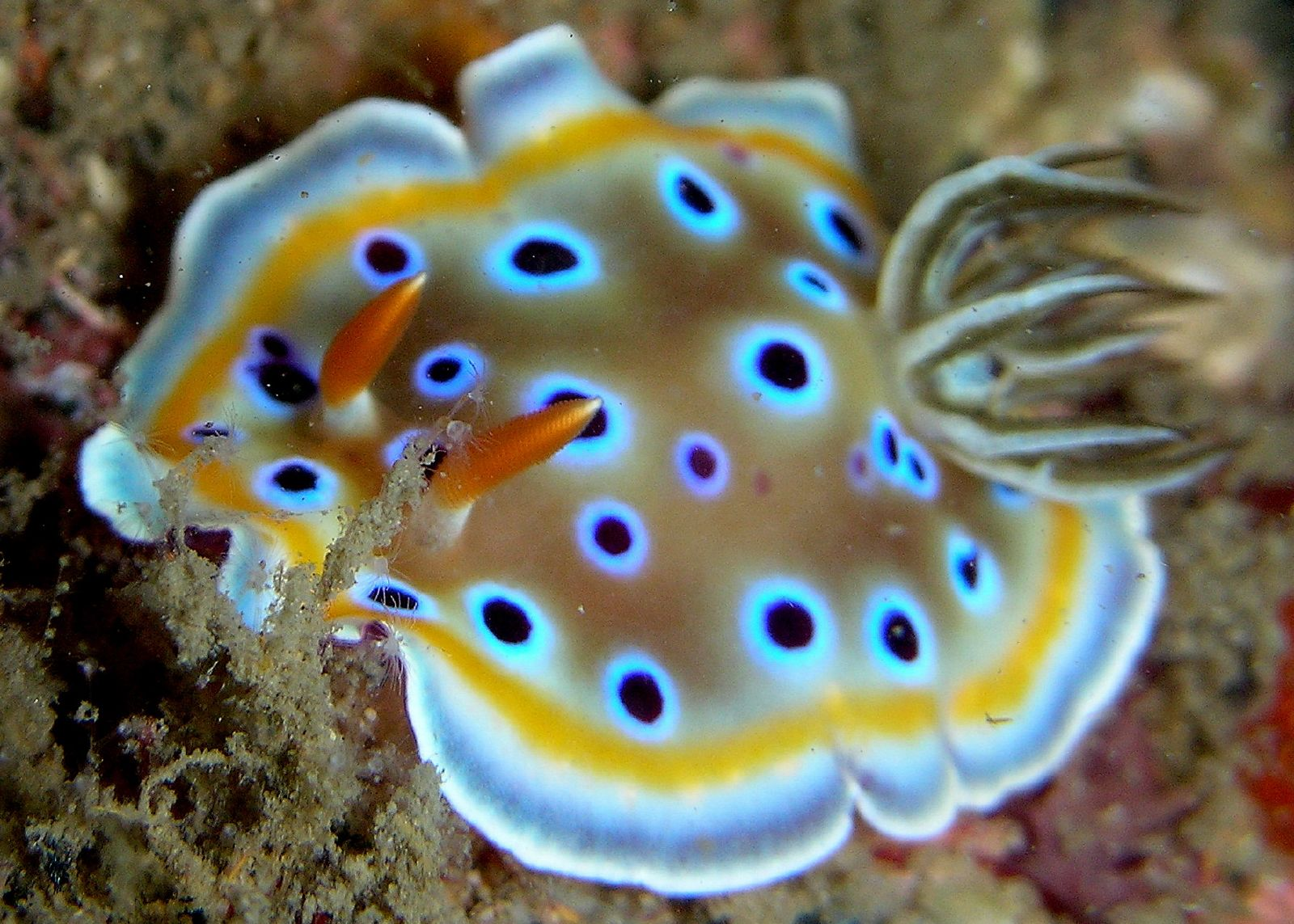
- Goniobranchus geminus

Scientific classification
- Kingdom: Animalia
- Phylum: Mollusca
- Class: Gastropoda
- Order: Nudibranchia
- Infraorder: Doridoidei
- Superfamily: Chromodoridoidea; Bergh, 1891

Families
- See text.

= Chromodoridoidea =

Superfamily of gastropods

Chromodoridoidea is a taxonomic superfamily of shell-less sea slugs, marine gastropod mollusks included in the clade Nudibranchia.

== Taxonomy ==
Families and subfamilies currently within Chromodoridoidea:

- Family Actinocyclidae O'Donoghue, 1929
- Family Cadlinellidae Odhner, 1934
- Family Cadlinidae Bergh, 1891
- Family Chromodorididae Bergh, 1891
  - Subfamily Chromodoridinae
  - Subfamily Miamirinae
- Family Hexabranchidae Bergh, 1891
- Family Showajidaiidae Korshunova, Fletcher, Picton, Lundin, Kashio, N. Sanamyan, K. Sanamyan, Padula, Schrödl & Martynov, 2020

Taxa brought into synonymy:

- Aldisidae Odhner, 1939 accepted as Cadlinidae Bergh, 1891
- Cadlinellinae Odhner, 1934 accepted as Cadlinellidae Odhner, 1934
- Ceratosomatidae Gray, 1857 accepted as Miamirinae Bergh, 1891
- Doriprismaticinae H. Adams & A. Adams, 1858 accepted as Chromodoridinae Bergh, 1891
- Echinochilidae Odhner, 1968 accepted as Cadlinidae Bergh, 1891
- Inudinae Er. Marcus & Ev. Marcus, 1967 accepted as Cadlinidae Bergh, 1891
- Glossodorididae O'Donoghue, 1924 accepted as Chromodoridinae Bergh, 1891
- Lissodoridinae Odhner, 1968 accepted as Chromodoridinae Bergh, 1891
- Thorunninane Odhner, 1926 accepted as Chromodoridinae Bergh, 1891
