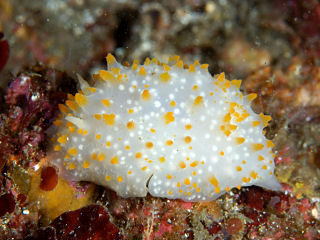
- Cadlinella sagamiensis

Scientific classification
- Kingdom: Animalia
- Phylum: Mollusca
- Class: Gastropoda
- Order: Nudibranchia
- Family: Showajidaiidae
- Genus: Showajidaia
- Species: S. sagamiensis

Binomial name
- Showajidaia sagamiensis Baba, 1937

Synonyms
- Cadlina sagamiensis Baba, 1937 (original combination); Cadlinella sagamiensis (Baba, 1937)

= Showajidaia sagamiensis =

Species of gastropod

Showajidaia sagamiensis is a species of sea slug, a dorid nudibranch, a shell-less marine gastropod mollusk in the family Showajidaiidae.

== Distribution ==
Known only from the central part of the Pacific coast of the Japanese island of Honshu, including Sagami Bay and Suruga Bay.
