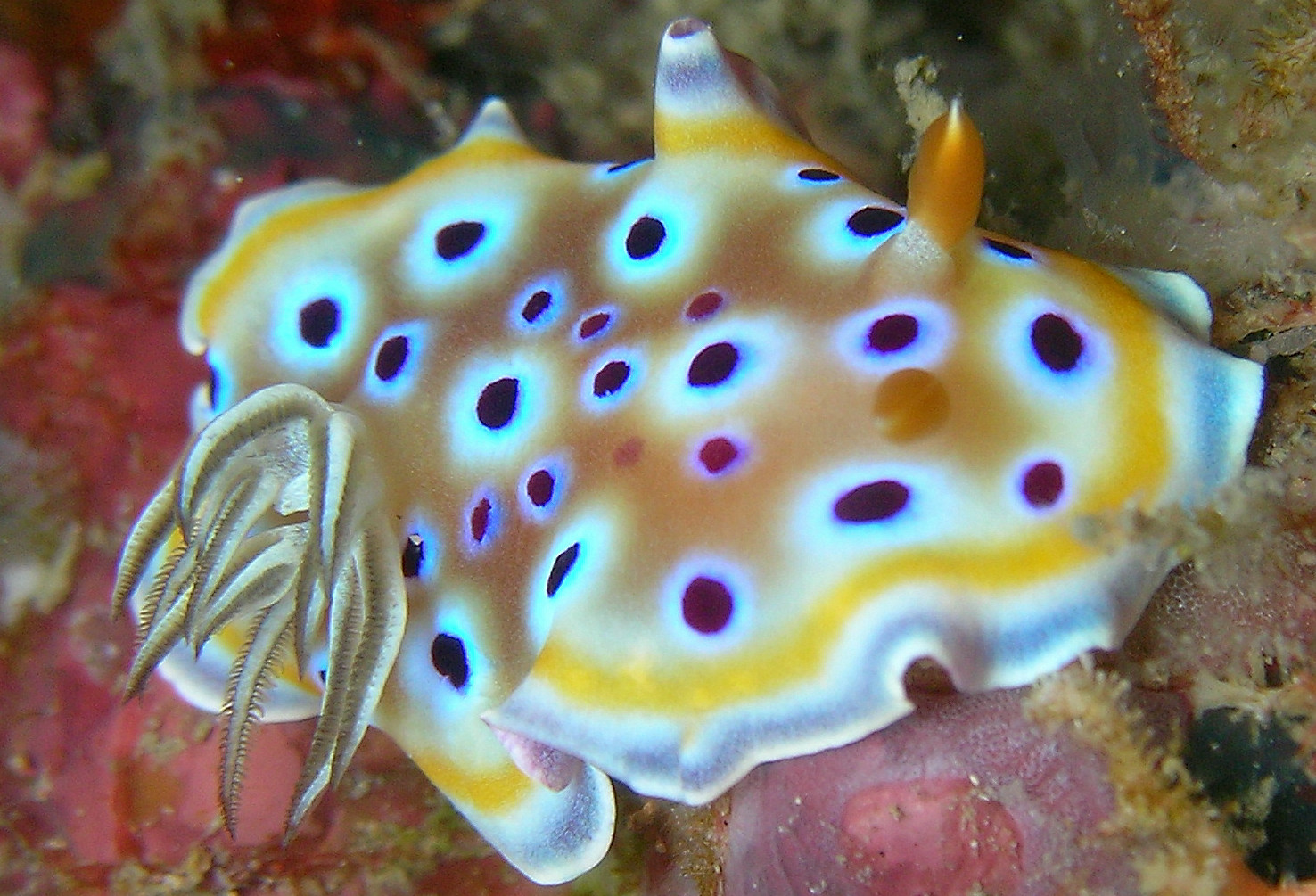

Scientific classification
- Kingdom: Animalia
- Phylum: Mollusca
- Class: Gastropoda
- Order: Nudibranchia
- Family: Chromodorididae
- Genus: Goniobranchus
- Species: G. geminus

Binomial name
- Goniobranchus geminus (Rudman, 1987à

Synonyms
- Chromodoris geminus Rudman, 1987 (basionym)

= Goniobranchus geminus =

Species of gastropod

Goniobranchus geminus, also known as the gem sea slug, is a species of very colourful sea slug, a dorid nudibranch, a marine gastropod mollusc in the family Chromodorididae.

== Taxonomic history ==
Until 2012 this species was known as Chromodoris geminus but was moved to the genus Goniobranchus as a result of a molecular (DNA) study.

== Description ==
Goniobranchus geminus can reach a maximum size of 5 cm in length. It has four distinctive coloured lines around the mantle edge. Starting from a thin white outer line, then a light grayish line, followed by another white line and finally a bright golden yellow line. The background coloration from the back is light brown to yellowish speckled with mauve ocelli circled with a white margin. The foot, clearer and with a white margin, also has ocelli. The rhinophores are yellow or purple and laminated, gills are white outlined with beige.

== Distribution and habitat ==
This sea slug lives in the Indian Ocean from Kenya to Sri Lanka and in the Red Sea and has a predilection for the external slopes of coral reefs.

== Similar species ==
- Goniobranchus kuniei (Pruvot-Fol, 1930).
- Goniobranchus leopardus (Rudman, 1987).
- Hypselodoris tryoni (Garrett, 1873).
- Goniobranchus tritos (Yonow, 1994).
