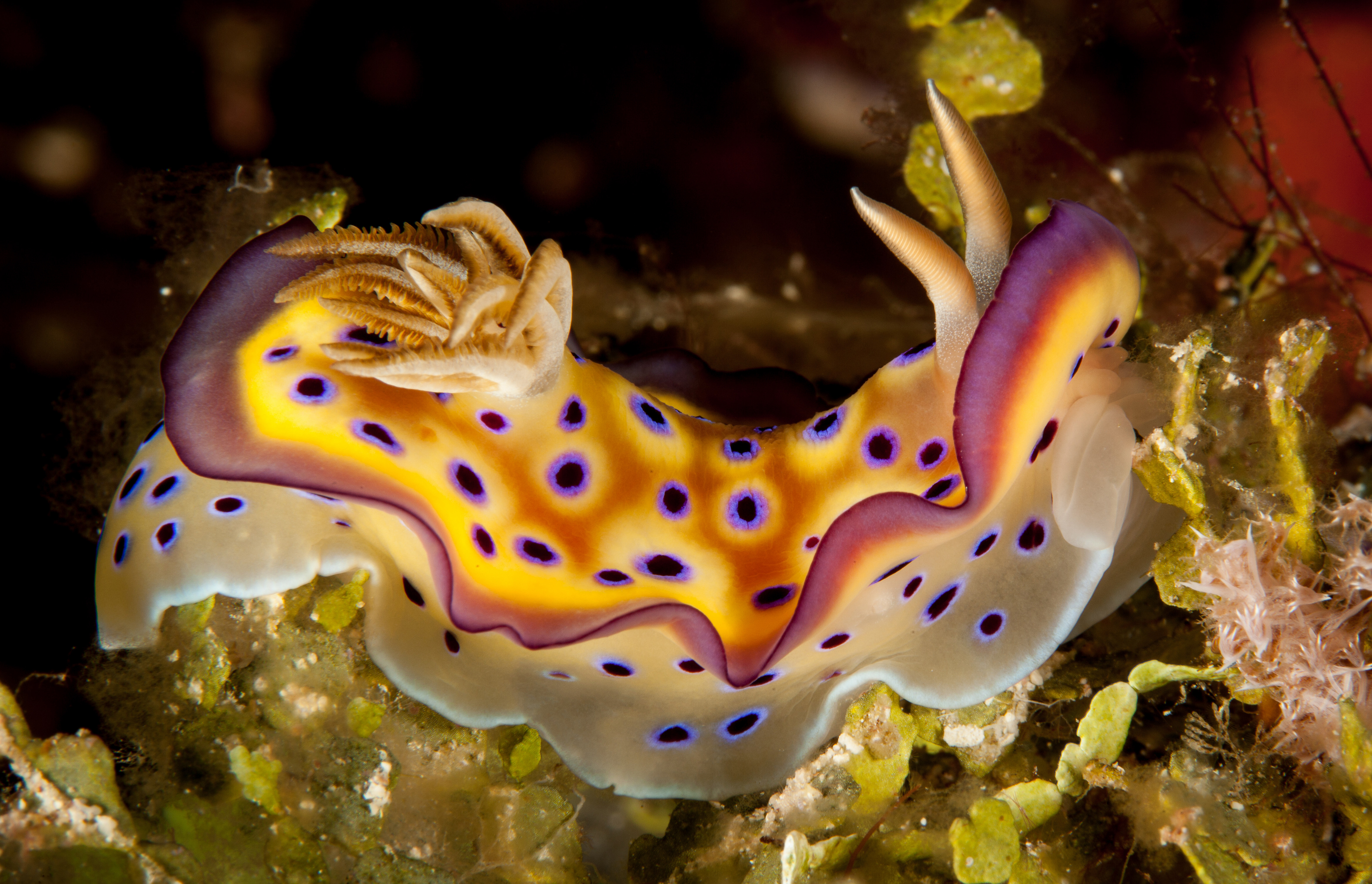

Scientific classification
- Kingdom: Animalia
- Phylum: Mollusca
- Class: Gastropoda
- Order: Nudibranchia
- Family: Chromodorididae
- Genus: Goniobranchus
- Species: G. kuniei

Binomial name
- Goniobranchus kuniei (Pruvot-Fol, 1930)

Synonyms
- Chromodoris kuniei Pruvot-Fol, 1930 basionym; Chromodoris kuniei ransoni (Pruvot-Fol, 1954); Glossodoris kuniei Pruvot-Fol, 1930); Glossodoris ransoni Pruvot-Fol, 1954

= Goniobranchus kuniei =

Species of gastropod

Goniobranchus kuniei is a species of a dorid nudibranch, a marine gastropod mollusc in the family Chromodorididae.

== Distribution ==
These species were initially documented in New Caledonia. They are known from the western Pacific Ocean and eastern Indian Ocean, including Fiji, the Marshall Islands, Australia, Papua New Guinea, Indonesia, Malaysia, the Philippines, and Taiwan.

== Description ==
The Goniobranchus kuniei has a striking pattern of blue spots with pale blue halos on a creamy-colored mantle. Its mantle also features a double border of purple and blue. The body can reach a length of approximately 40 mm (1.6 in). The species Goniobranchus tritos and Goniobranchus geminus share similar color patterns.

== Habitat ==
This species likes waters that are 21–26 °C (70–79 °F) and is often found between 5 and 40 meters (16 and 131 ft).

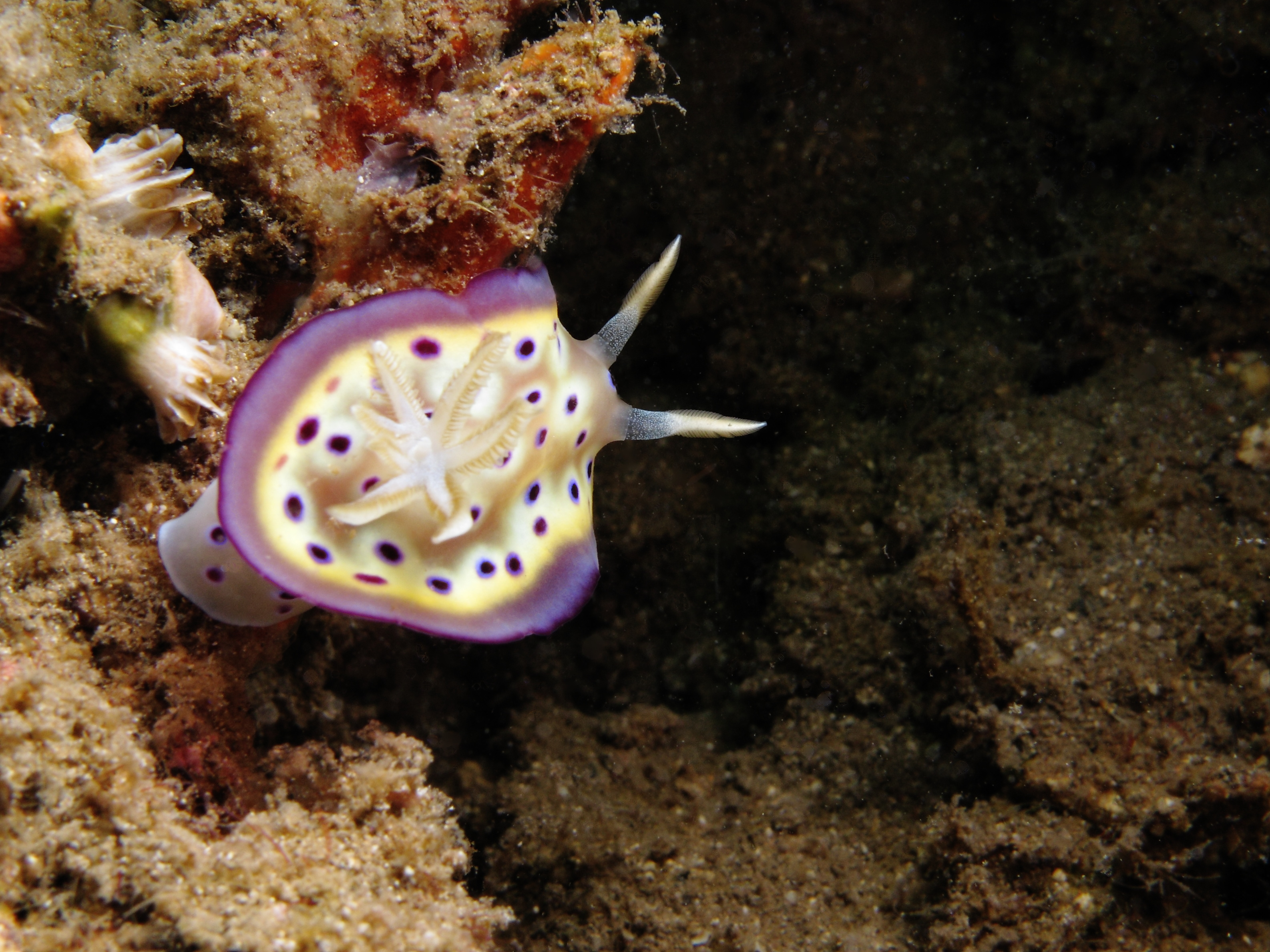
Goniobranchus kuniei at Bima bay (Sumbawa, Indonesia)

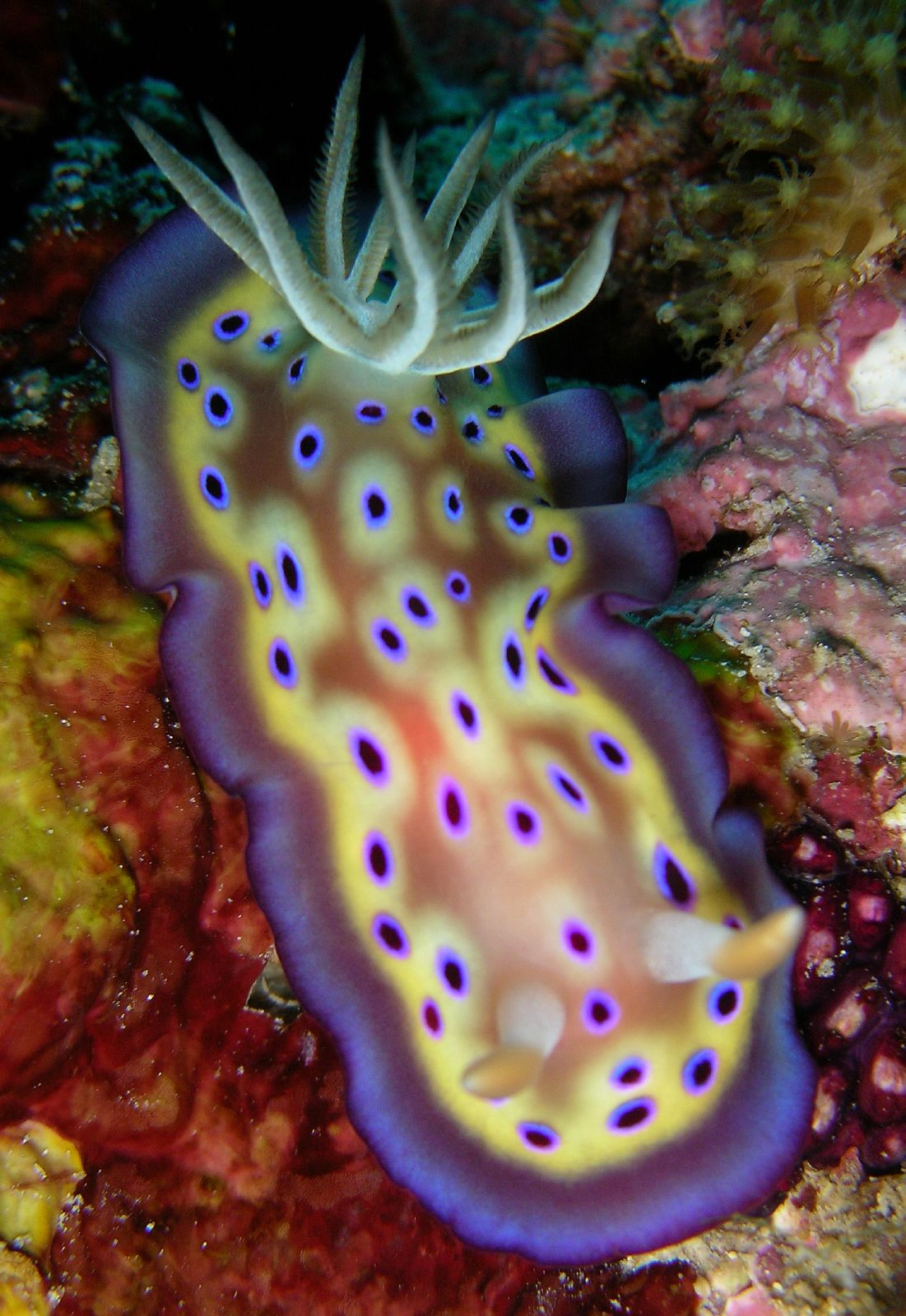
Goniobranchus kuniei
