= Miamirinae =

- Miamira miamirana, anterior end towards upper left

Scientific classification
- Kingdom: Animalia
- Phylum: Mollusca
- Class: Gastropoda
- Order: Nudibranchia
- Family: Chromodorididae
- Subfamily: Miamirinae; Bergh, 1891

Type genus
- Miamira Bergh, 1874

Genera
- See text

Synonyms
- Ceratosomatidae J.E. Gray, 1857

Subfamily of gastropods

Miamirinae is a taxonomic subfamily of colourful sea slugs; dorid nudibranchs, marine gastropod mollusks in the family Chromodorididae.

It was established as a subfamily in by Rudolph Bergh in 1891, despite his usage of the suffix -idae that traditionally denotes familial status.

== Description ==
The original 1891 text describes Miamirinids as being ovular in shape with a notum that is somewhat flatter but also domed. The mantle margin is somewhat broad, and the foot not narrow. Oral tentacles are very small.

All Miamirindids eat sponges.

== Genera ==
Genera currently within Miamirinae include:

- Ceratosoma J. E. Gray, 1850
- Felimare Ev. Marcus & Er. Marcus, 1967
- Hypselodoris W. Stimpson, 1855
- Mexichromis Bertsch, 1977
- Miamira Bergh, 1874
- Thorunna Bergh, 1878

Genera currently in synonymy include:

- Babaina Odhner, 1968: synonym of Thorunna Bergh, 1878
- Brachychlanis Ehrenberg, 1831 : synonym of Hypselodoris W. Stimpson, 1855
- Digidentis Rudman, 1984: synonym of Thorunna Bergh, 1878
- Durvilledoris Rudman, 1984: synonym of Mexichromis Bertsch, 1977
- Jeanrisbecia Franc, 1968: synonym of Hypselodoris W. Stimpson, 1855
- Orodoris Bergh, 1875: synonym of Miamira Bergh, 1874
- Pectendoris Rudman, 1984: synonym of Mexichromis Bertsch, 1977
- Pterodoris Ehrenberg, 1831: synonym of Hypselodoris W. Stimpson, 1855
- Risbecia Odhner, 1934: synonym of Hypselodoris W. Stimpson, 1855
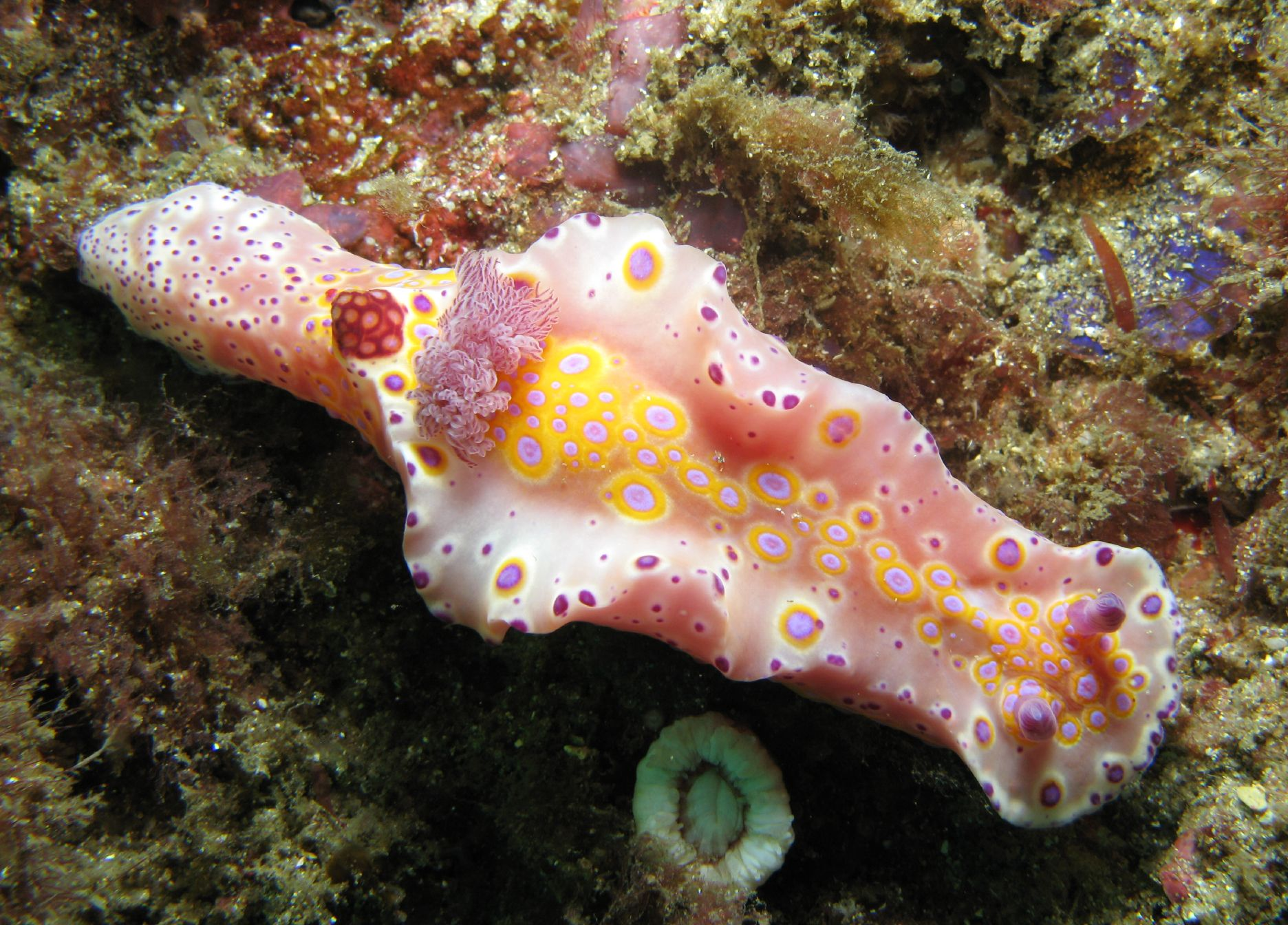
Ceratosoma brevicaudatum

Felimare agassizii

Hypselodoris bullockii mating

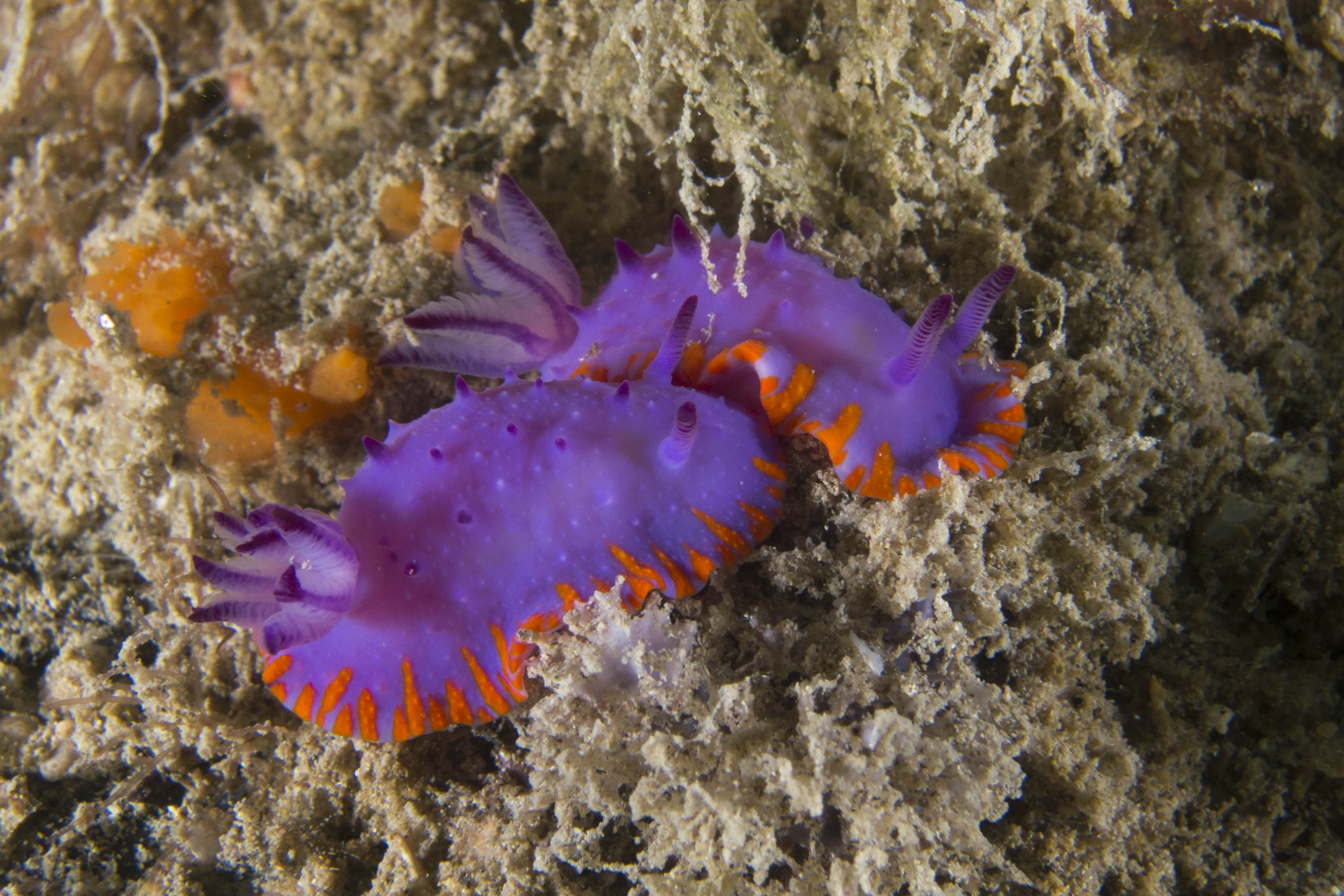
Two Mexichromis macropus

Miamira sinuata

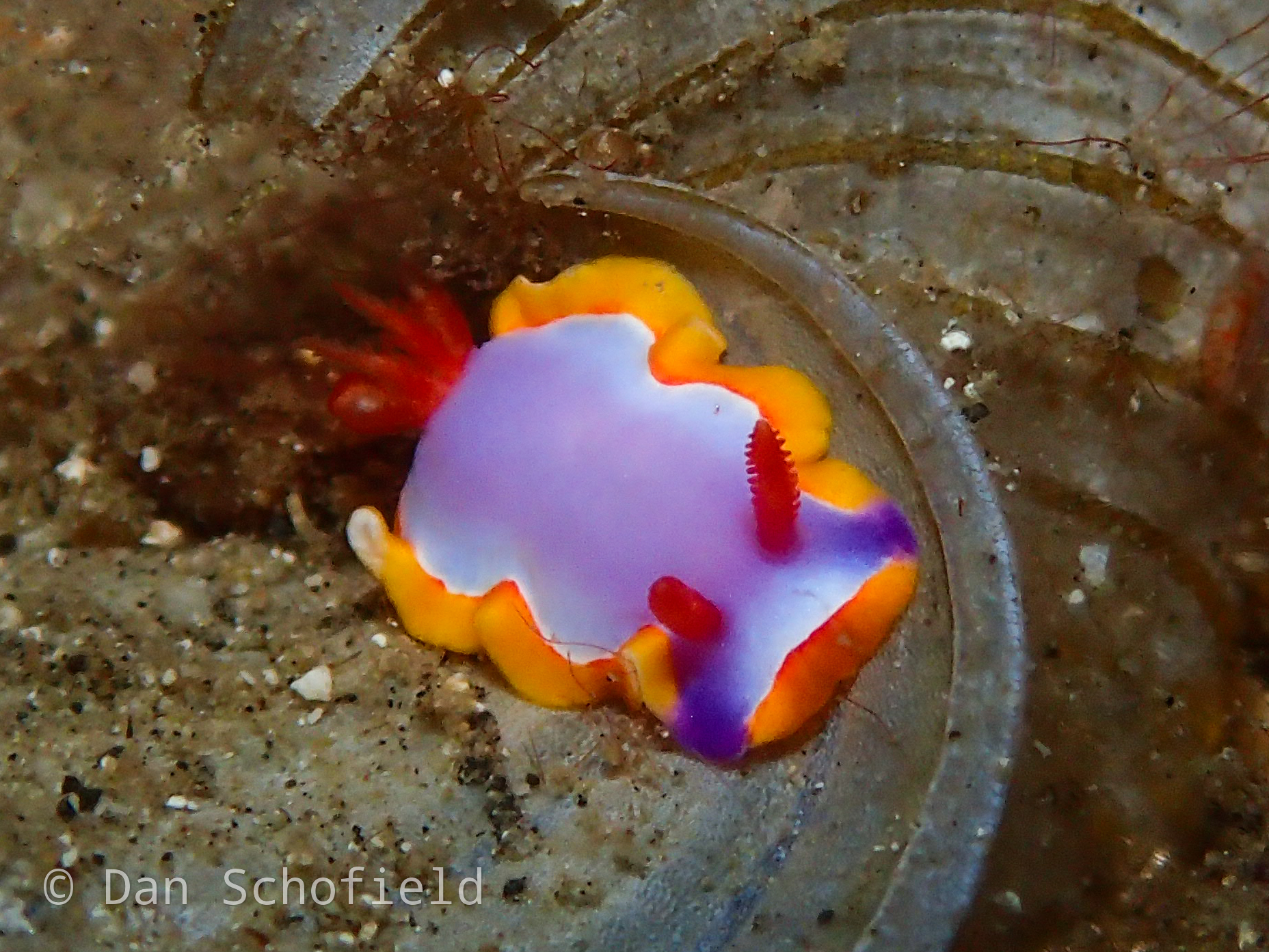
Thorunna purpuropedis
