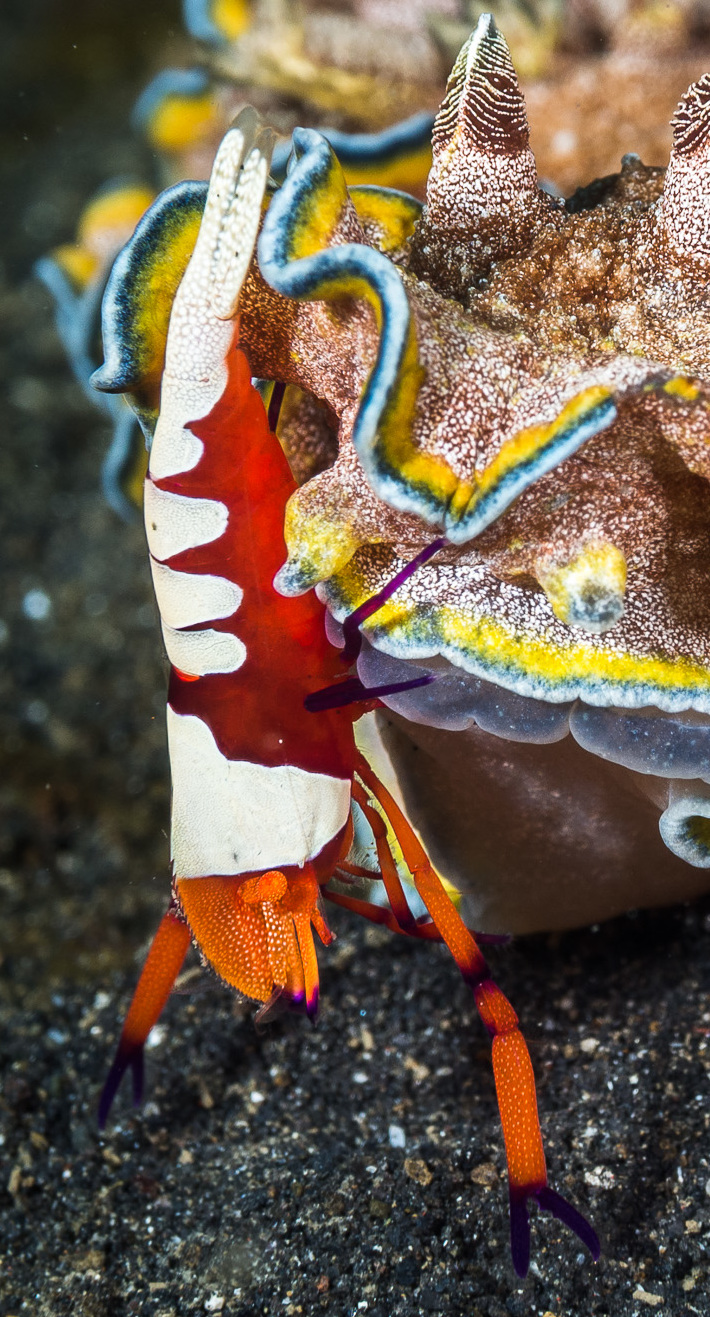
- With the cleaning shrimp Zenopontonia rex

Scientific classification
- Kingdom: Animalia
- Phylum: Mollusca
- Class: Gastropoda
- Order: Nudibranchia
- Family: Chromodorididae
- Genus: Glossodoris
- Species: G. cincta

Binomial name
- Glossodoris cincta (Bergh, 1888)

= Glossodoris cincta =

Species of gastropod

Glossodoris cincta is a species of sea slug, a dorid nudibranch, a shell-less marine gastropod mollusk in the family Chromodorididae. This name has been extensively used for a group of similarly coloured species, some of which are unnamed.

== Distribution ==
This species was described from Ile Marianne, Fouquets Reef, Mauritius. This species has been reported in error widely in the Indo-Pacific region but these reports should be referred to Glossodoris acosti or undescribed Glossodoris species. The only reliable recent records are from Réunion.

== Description ==
Glossodoris cincta has a mantle which is tawny brown with blue-white dots and a dark blue margin to the mantle which is separated from the brown by a thin grey line. The rhinophores are dark brown with blue-white dots. The living holotype was 60 mm (2.4 in) in length.

== Gallery ==
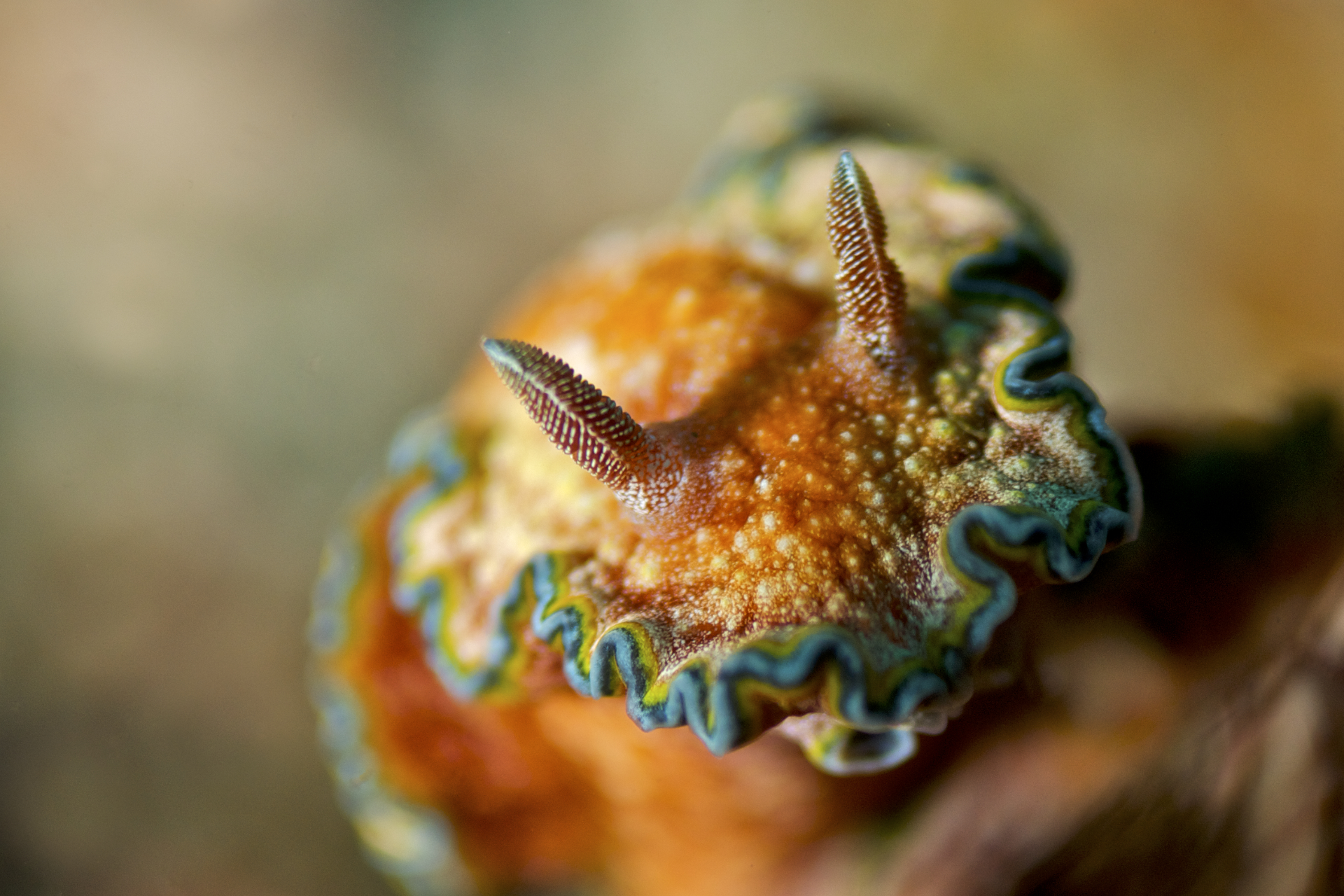
Frontal closeup of Glossodoris cincta

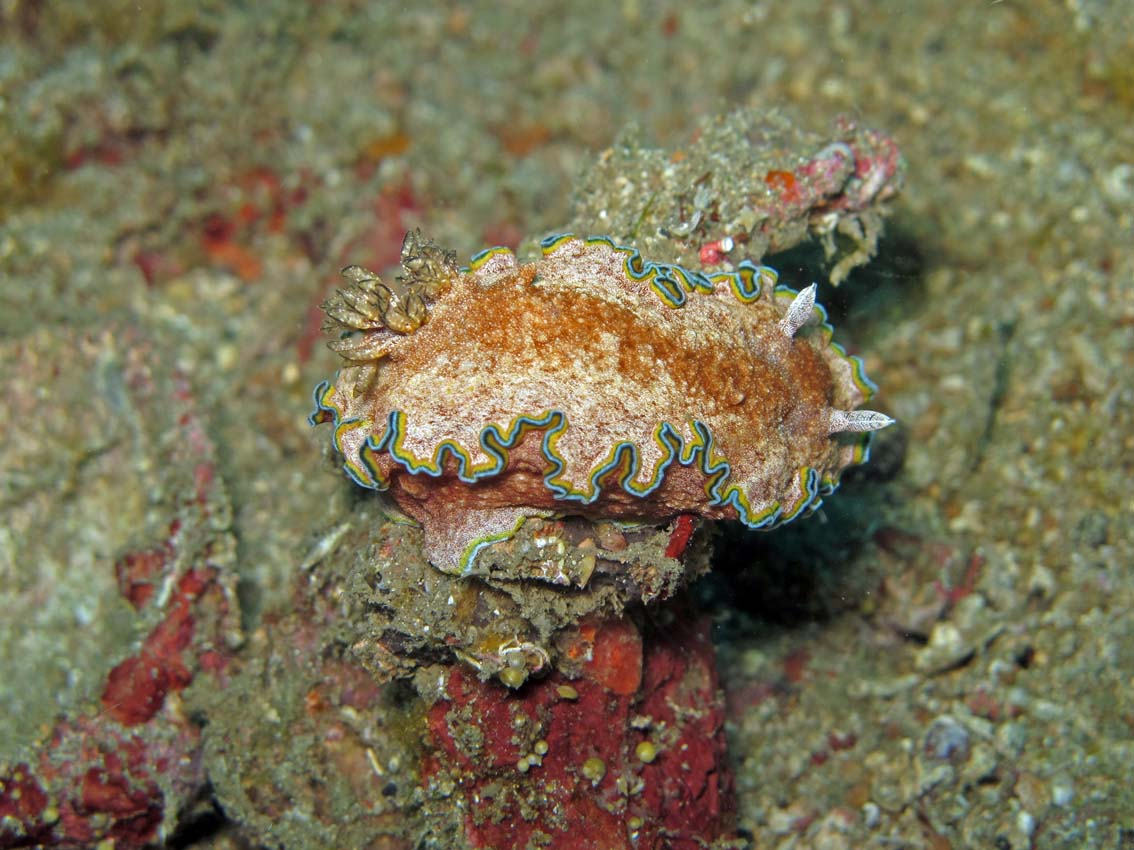
Glossodoris cincta at Lembeh Bali, 2011

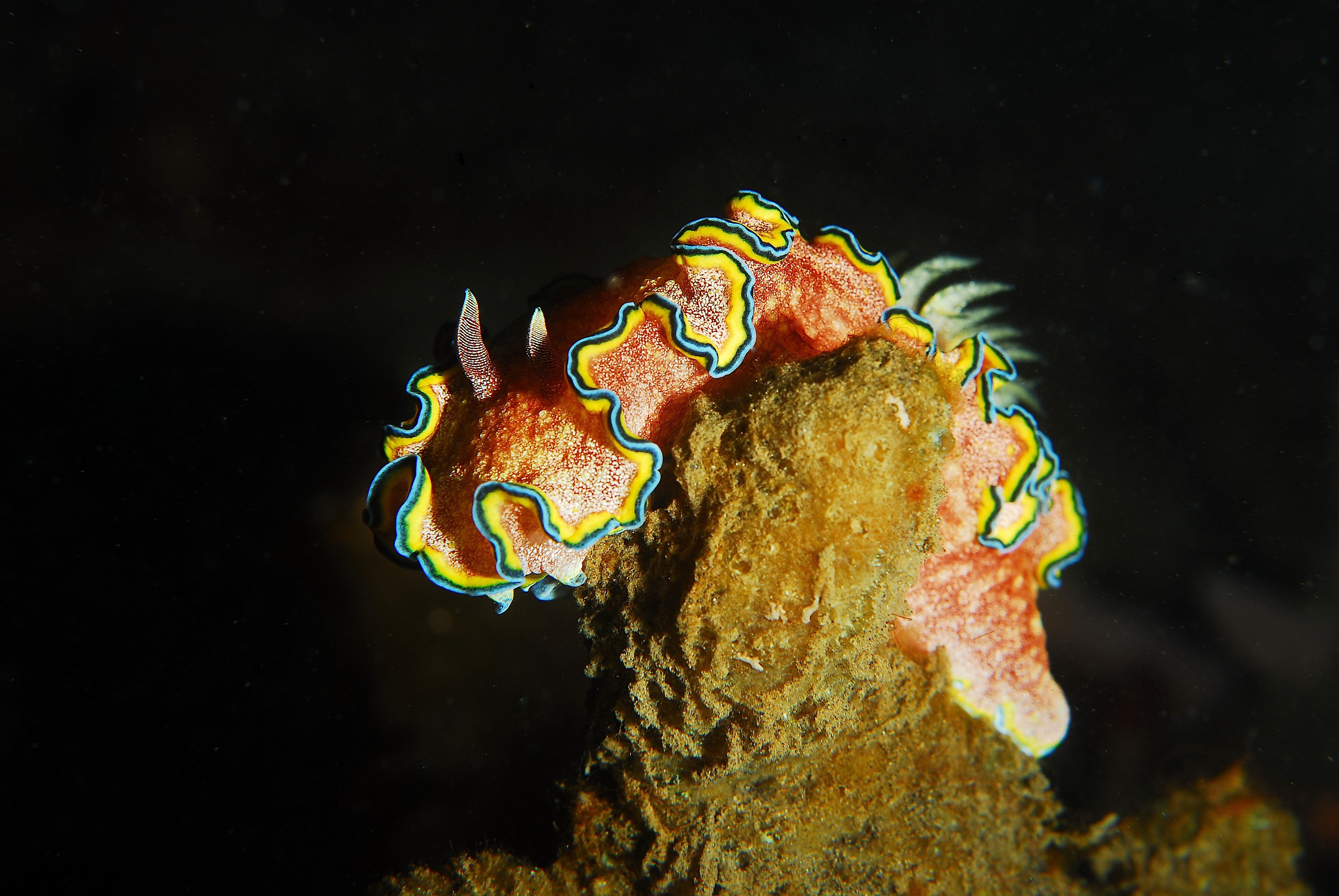
Glossodoris cincta

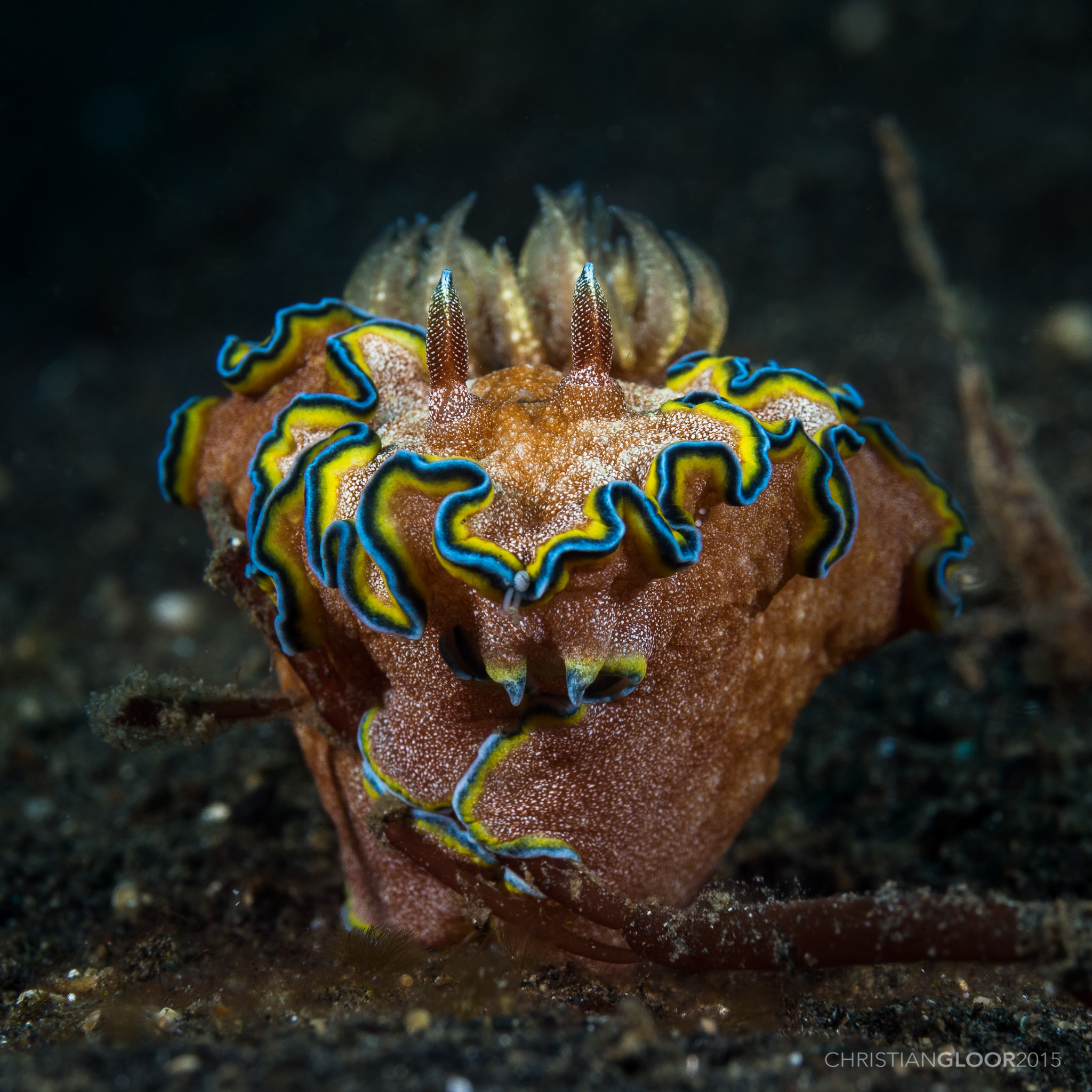
Glossodoris cincta at Wakatobi National Park Indonesia, 2015

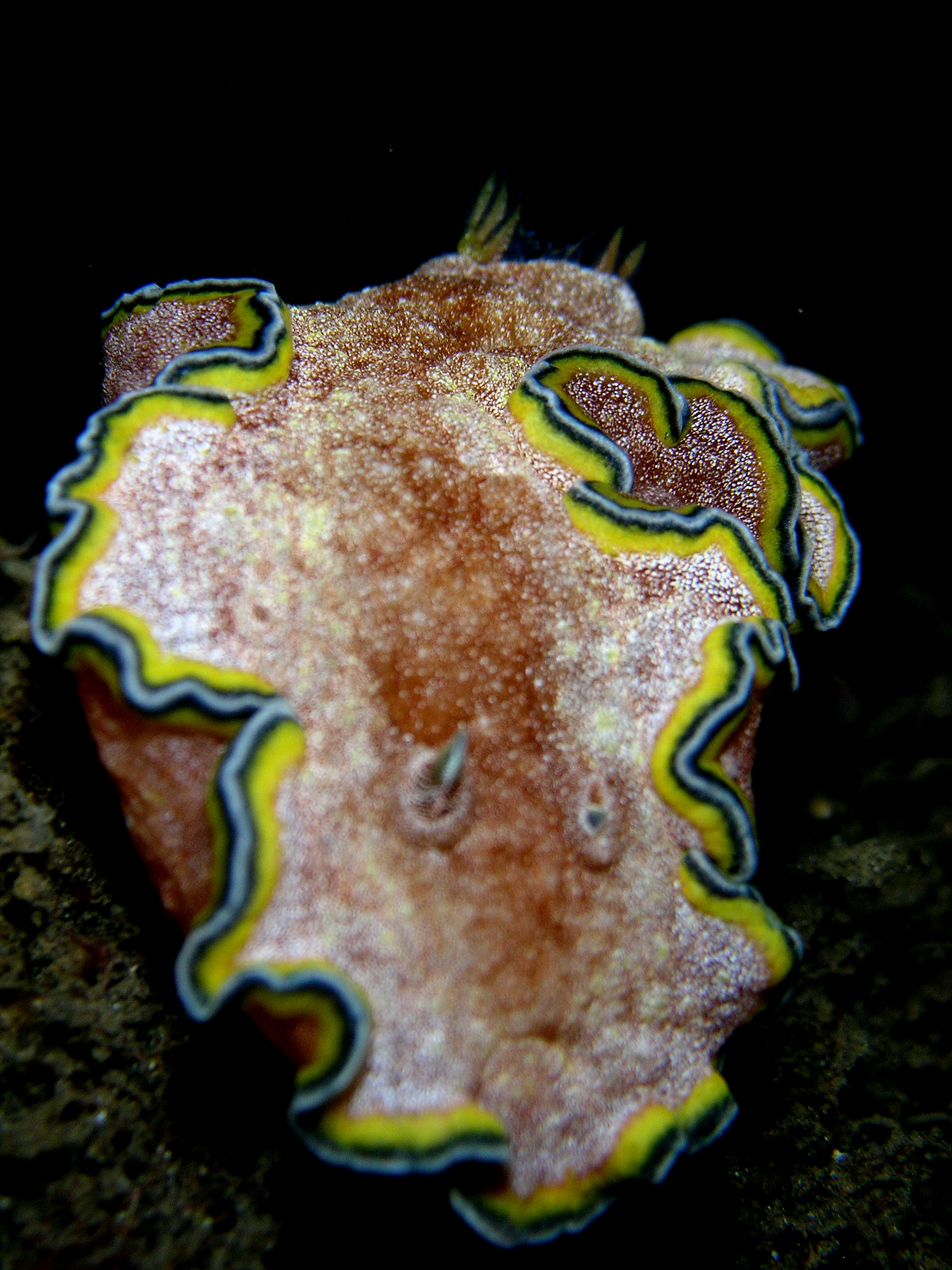
Glossodoris cincta
