= Berlanguella =

Scientific classification
- Kingdom: Animalia
- Phylum: Mollusca
- Class: Gastropoda
- Order: Nudibranchia
- Family: Chromodorididae
- Genus: Berlanguella; Ortea, Bacallado & Valdés, 1992
- Species: B. scopae

Binomial name
- Berlanguella scopae Ortea, Bacallado & Valdés, 1992

Genus of gastropods

Berlanguella is a genus of sea slugs, specifically dorid nudibranchs, shell-less marine gastropod molluscs in the family Chromodorididae. It is a monotypic genus and Berlanguella scopae is the only species in the genus.

== Distribution ==
This species was described from Caleta James, Santiago, in the Galápagos Islands. It was found at four other sites on different islands in the group, Isabela, Fernandina, Puerto Ayora on Isla Santa Cruz and Espanola.

== Description ==
Berlanguella scopae is similar in appearance to species of Doriopsis with low rounded tubercles on the mantle and the gills arranged in a flat horseshoe-shape. It is translucent white or cream with yellow or orange tubercles.

== Ecology ==
This nudibranch was collected at a number of sites on a cream coloured sponge in the intertidal zone.
