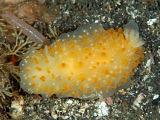

Scientific classification
- Kingdom: Animalia
- Phylum: Mollusca
- Class: Gastropoda
- Order: Nudibranchia
- Family: Showajidaiidae
- Genus: Showajidaia; Korshunova, Fletcher, Picton, Lundin, Kashio, N. Sanamyan, K. Sanamyan, Padula, Schrödl & Martynov, 2020

= Showajidaia =

Genus of gastropods

Showajidaia is a genus of sea slugs, dorid nudibranchs, shell-less marine gastropod mollusks.

== Species ==
Species in the genus Showajidaia include:

- Showajidaia sagamiensis Baba, 1937
