= Babaina =

Babaina may refer to:

- Babaina Odhner in Franc, 1968, a genus of gastropods in the family Chromodorididae, synonym of Thorunna
- Babaina Roller, 1972, a genus of gastropods in the family Flabellinidae, synonym of Babakina
