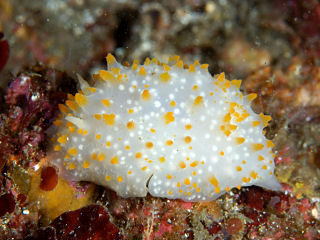

Scientific classification
- Kingdom: Animalia
- Phylum: Mollusca
- Class: Gastropoda
- Order: Nudibranchia
- Superfamily: Chromodoridoidea
- Family: Showajidaiidae; Korshunova, Fletcher, Picton, Lundin, Kashio, N. Sanamyan, K. Sanamyan, Padula, Schrödl & Martynov, 2020

= Showajidaiidae =

Family of gastropods

Showajidaiidae is a family of sea slugs, dorid nudibranchs, marine gastropod mollusks in the superfamily Chromodoridoidea.

== Taxonomy ==
Genera within the family Showajidaiidae include:

- Showajidaia Korshunova, Fletcher, Picton, Lundin, Kashio, N. Sanamyan, K. Sanamyan, Padula, Schrödl & Martynov, 2020
