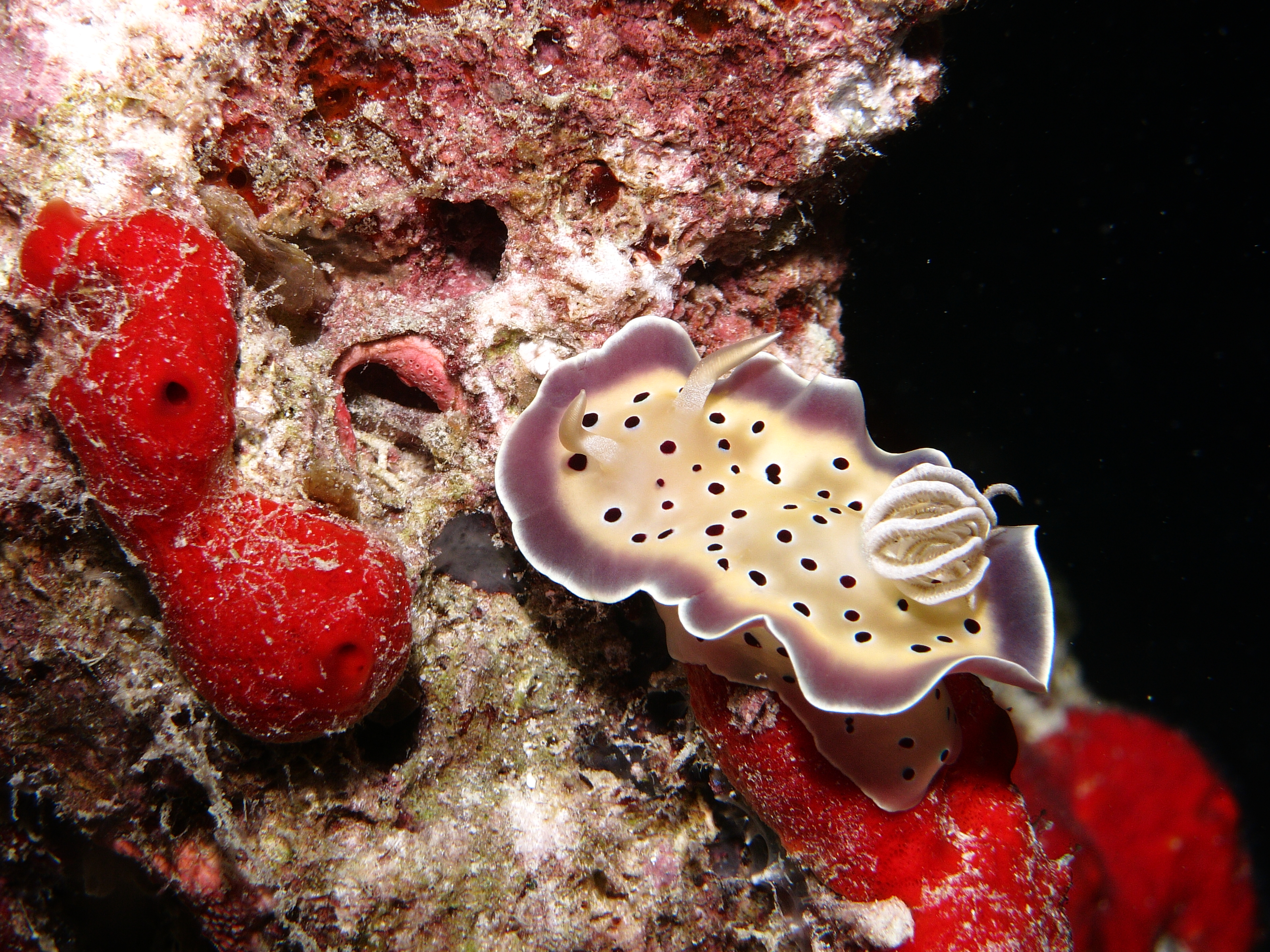

Scientific classification
- Kingdom: Animalia
- Phylum: Mollusca
- Class: Gastropoda
- Order: Nudibranchia
- Family: Chromodorididae
- Genus: Goniobranchus
- Species: G. tritos

Binomial name
- Goniobranchus tritos (Yonow, 1994)

Synonyms
- Chromodoris tritos Yonow, 1994 (basionym)

= Goniobranchus tritos =

Species of gastropod

Goniobranchus tritos is a species of colourful sea slug, a dorid nudibranch, a marine gastropod mollusk in the family Chromodorididae.

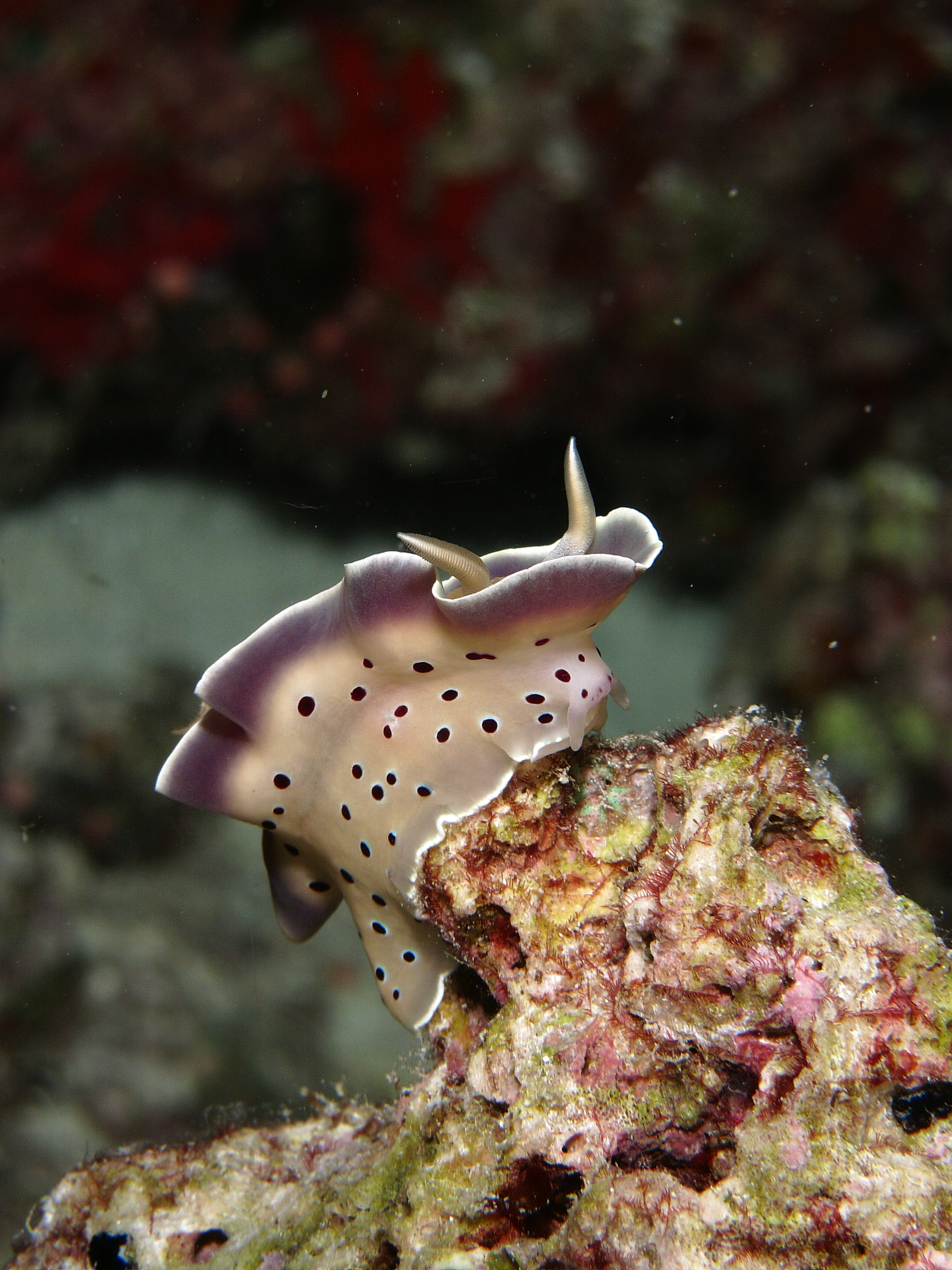
Chromodoris tritos

== Distribution ==
This marine species occurs off the Maldives.

== Description ==
Goniobranchus tritos has a cream coloured mantle with round black spots, each of which is outlined with a white line. There is a broad band of lilac-grey around the mantle and a narrow line of opaque white at the edge. The gills and rhinophores are grey with white highlights. The body reaches a length of 50 mm.
