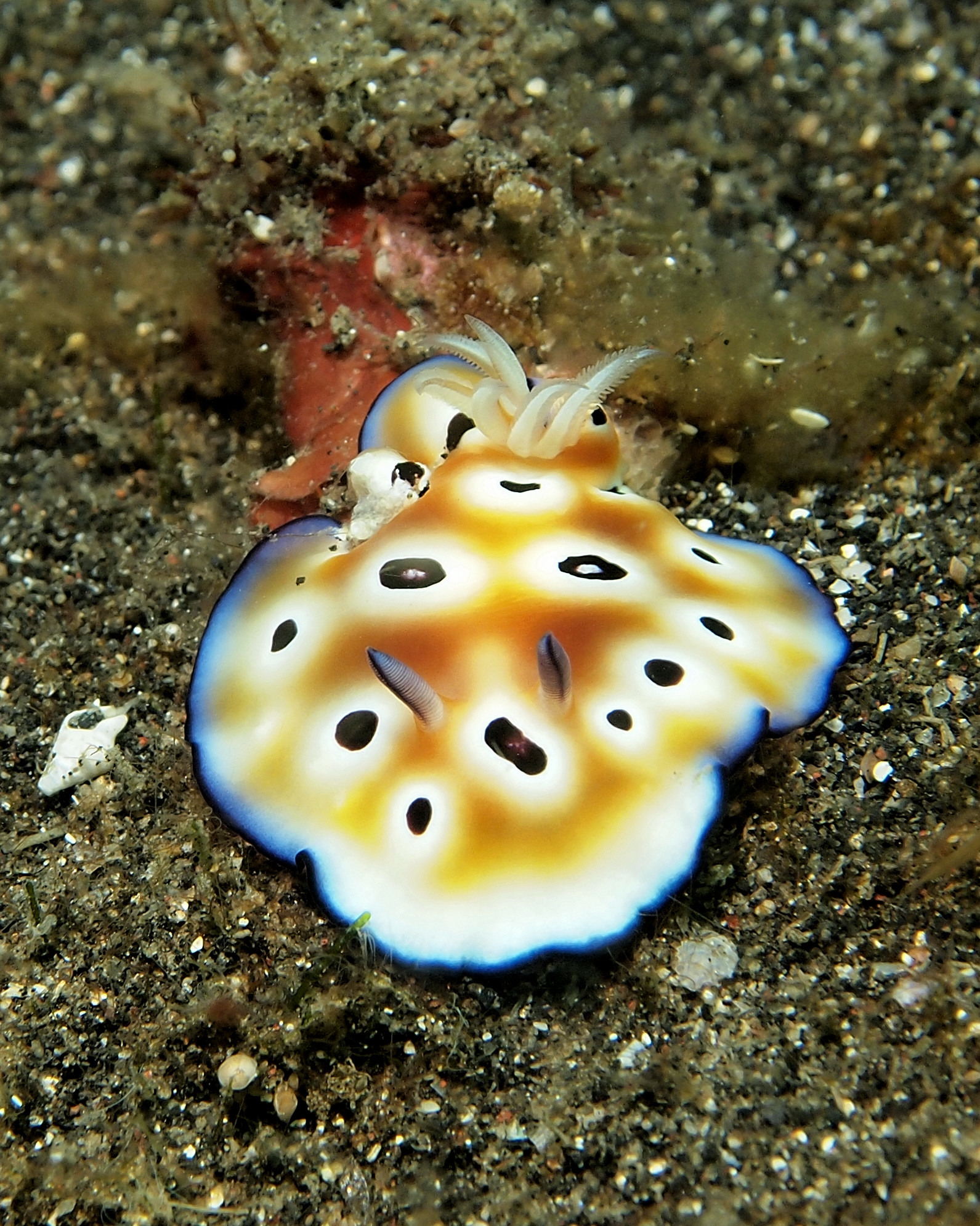
- The nudibranch Goniobranchus leopardus, facing the camera.

Scientific classification
- Kingdom: Animalia
- Phylum: Mollusca
- Class: Gastropoda
- Order: Nudibranchia
- Family: Chromodorididae
- Genus: Goniobranchus
- Species: G. leopardus

Binomial name
- Goniobranchus leopardus (Rudman, 1987)

Synonyms
- Chromodoris leopardus Rudman, 1987 (basionym)

= Goniobranchus leopardus =

Species of gastropod

Goniobranchus leopardus, is a species of colourful sea slug, a dorid nudibranch, a marine gastropod mollusc in the family Chromodorididae.

== Distribution ==
This species has been reported from NW Australia, Indonesia, Malaysia, the Philippines and the Solomon Islands.

== Description ==
Goniobranchus leopardus can reach a maximum size of 6 cm length. The body is elongate with a foot which is distinct from the upper body by a large skirt-like mantle hiding the foot. The top of the mantle is brownish with dark spots circled with white. The margin of the mantle is white with at the external border a fine purple to electric blue line. The rhinophores are lamellate and contractile, the base is white topped with blue to purple but they can also be white with a longitudinal blue to purple line. The branched gill has a whitish external side, the internal surface is golden.
