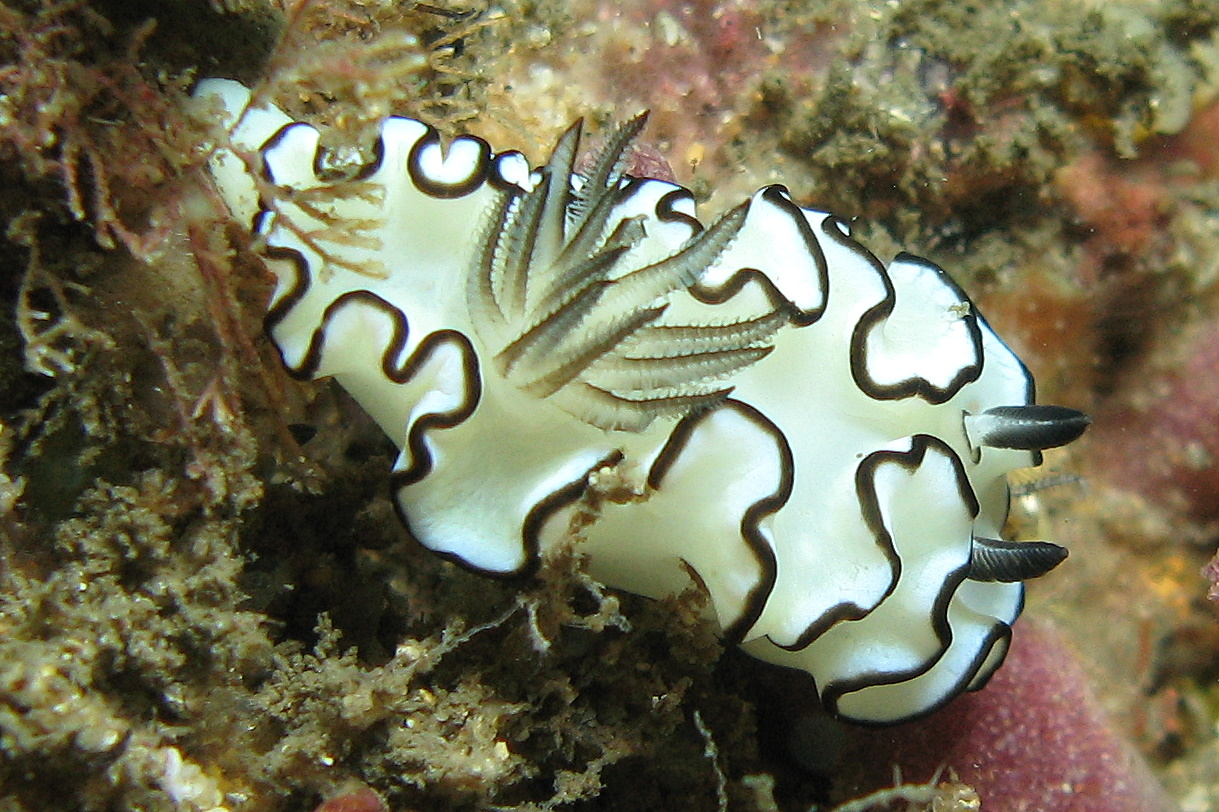
- Doriprismatica atromarginata

Scientific classification
- Kingdom: Animalia
- Phylum: Mollusca
- Class: Gastropoda
- Order: Nudibranchia
- Superfamily: Chromodoridoidea
- Family: Chromodorididae; Bergh, 1891

Type genus
- Chromodoris

Genera
- See text

= Chromodorididae =

Family of gastropods

Chromodorididae, or chromodorids, are a taxonomic family of colourful sea slugs; dorid nudibranchs, marine gastropod mollusks in the superfamily Chromodoridoidea. The over 390 described species are primarily found in tropical and subtropical waters, as members of coral reef communities, specifically associated with their sponge prey. The chromodorids are the most speciose family of opisthobranchs. They range in size from less than 10 mm (0.4 in) to over 30 cm (12 in), although most species are approximately 15–30 mm (0.6–1.2 in) in size.

Although, they have a worldwide distribution, most species are found in the Indo-Pacific region. A scientific paper published in 2007, found the most widespread chromodorid genera, (Mexichromis, Chromodoris, Glossodoris and Hypselodoris) to be paraphyletic or polyphyletic.

The family Cadlinidae Bergh, 1891 has been considered a synonym of the Chromodorididae. Research by R.F. Johnson in 2011 has shown that Cadlina does not belong to the family Chromodorididae. She has therefore brought back the name Cadlinidae from synonymy with Chromodorididae. The chromodorid nudibranchs without Cadlina are now monophyletic and turn out to be a possible sister to the family Actinocyclidae. Cadlina, Aldisa, and Inuda are the only three genera currently classified in the Cadlinidae.

A comprehensive phylogeny of the chromodorid nudibranchs found every one of the 14 traditional chromodorid genera were either non-monophyletic, or rendered another genus paraphyletic. Additionally, both the monotypic genera Verconia and Diversidoris are nested within clades. The authors presented a new classification of the chromodorid nudibranchs, which used molecular data to untangle evolutionary relationships and at the same time retains a historical connection to traditional systematics by using generic names attached to type species as clade names. All Chromodorid nudibranchs feed on sponges.

== Genera ==
Genera within the family Chromodorididae include:

- Subfamiliy Chromodoridinae
  - Ardeadoris Rudman, 1984
  - Berlanguella Ortea, Bacallado & Valdés, 1992
  - Chromodoris Alder and Hancock, 1855 – the type genus
  - Chromolaichma Bertsch, 1977
  - Diversidoris Rudman, 1987
  - Doriprismatica d'Orbigny, 1839
  - Felimida Ev. Marcus, 1971
  - Glossodoris Ehrenberg, 1831
  - Goniobranchus Pease, 1866
  - Neptunazurea Ribeiro, García-Méndez, Valdés, Schrödl & Padula, 2025
  - Rudmania J. P. G. Oliveira, Henryco, Ardila, Schrödl & Padula, 2025
  - Tyrinna Bergh, 1898
  - Verconia Pruvot-Fol, 1931 – synonym: Noumea Risbec, 1928
- Subfamily Miamirinae
  - Ceratosoma J. E. Gray and M. E. Gray, 1850
  - Felimare Ev. Marcus & Er. Marcus, 1967
  - Hypselodoris Stimpson, 1855
  - Mexichromis Bertsch, 1977
  - Miamira Bergh, 1874
  - Thorunna Bergh, 1878

Genera brought into synonymy

- Actinodoris Ehrenberg, 1831 : synonym of Chromodoris Alder & Hancock, 1855
- Babaina Odhner in Franc, 1968 : synonym of Thorunna Bergh, 1878
- Casella H. Adams & A. Adams, 1854 : synonym of Glossodoris Ehrenberg, 1831
- Crepidodoris Pagenstecher, 1877 : synonym of Doriprismatica A. d'Orbigny, 1839
- Digidentis Rudman, 1984 : synonym of Thorunna Bergh, 1878
- Durvilledoris Rudman, 1984 : synonym of Mexichromis Bertsch, 1977
- Jeanrisbecia Franc, 1968 : synonym of Hypselodoris Stimpson, 1855
- Lissodoris Odhner, 1934 : synonym of Goniobranchus Pease, 1866
- Noumea Risbec, 1928 (preoccupied by a beetle): synonym of Verconia Pruvot-Fol, 1931
- Orodoris Bergh, 1875 : synonym of Miamira Bergh, 1874
- Pectenodoris Rudman, 1984 : synonym of Mexichromis Bertsch, 1977
- Pterodoris Ehrenberg, 1831 : synonym of Hypselodoris Stimpson, 1855
- Risbecia Odhner, 1934 : synonym of Hypselodoris W. Stimpson, 1855
- Rosodoris Pruvot-Fol, 1954 : synonym of Glossodoris Ehrenberg, 1831
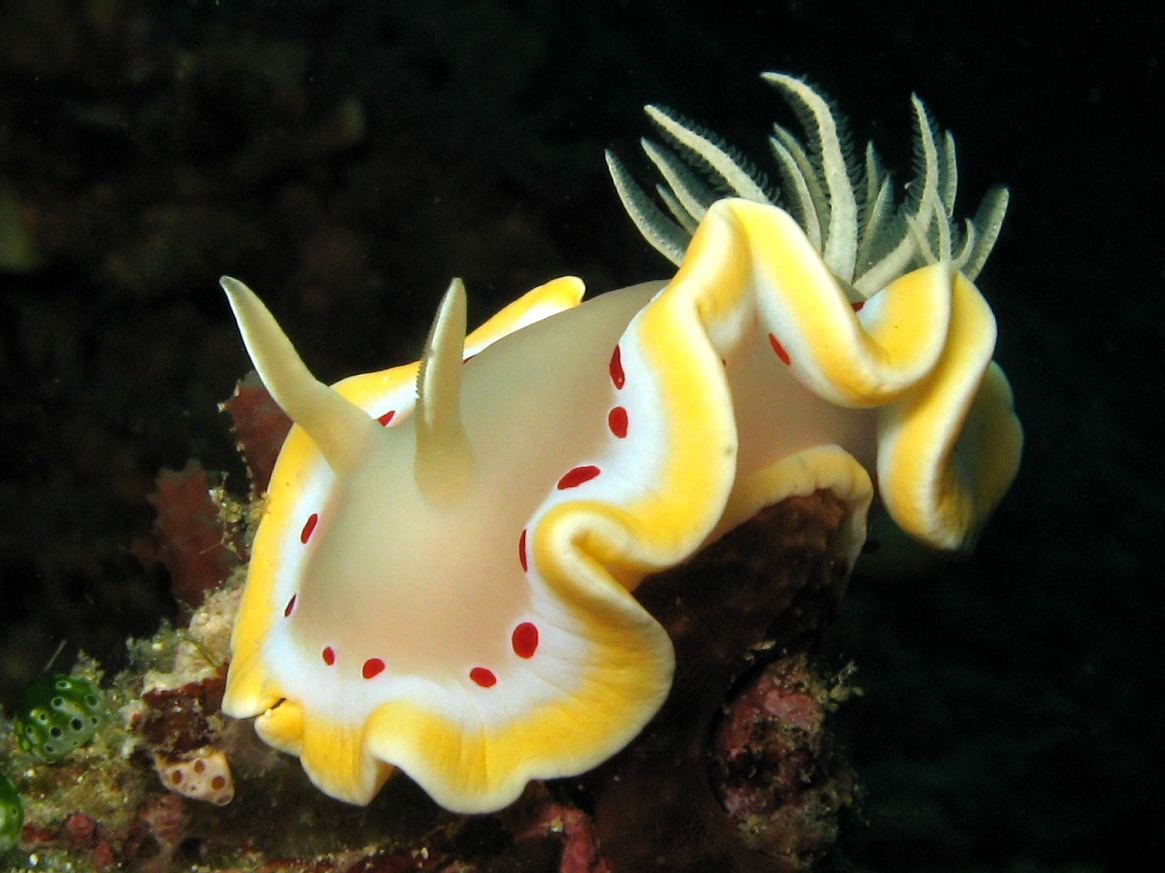
Ardeadoris cruenta

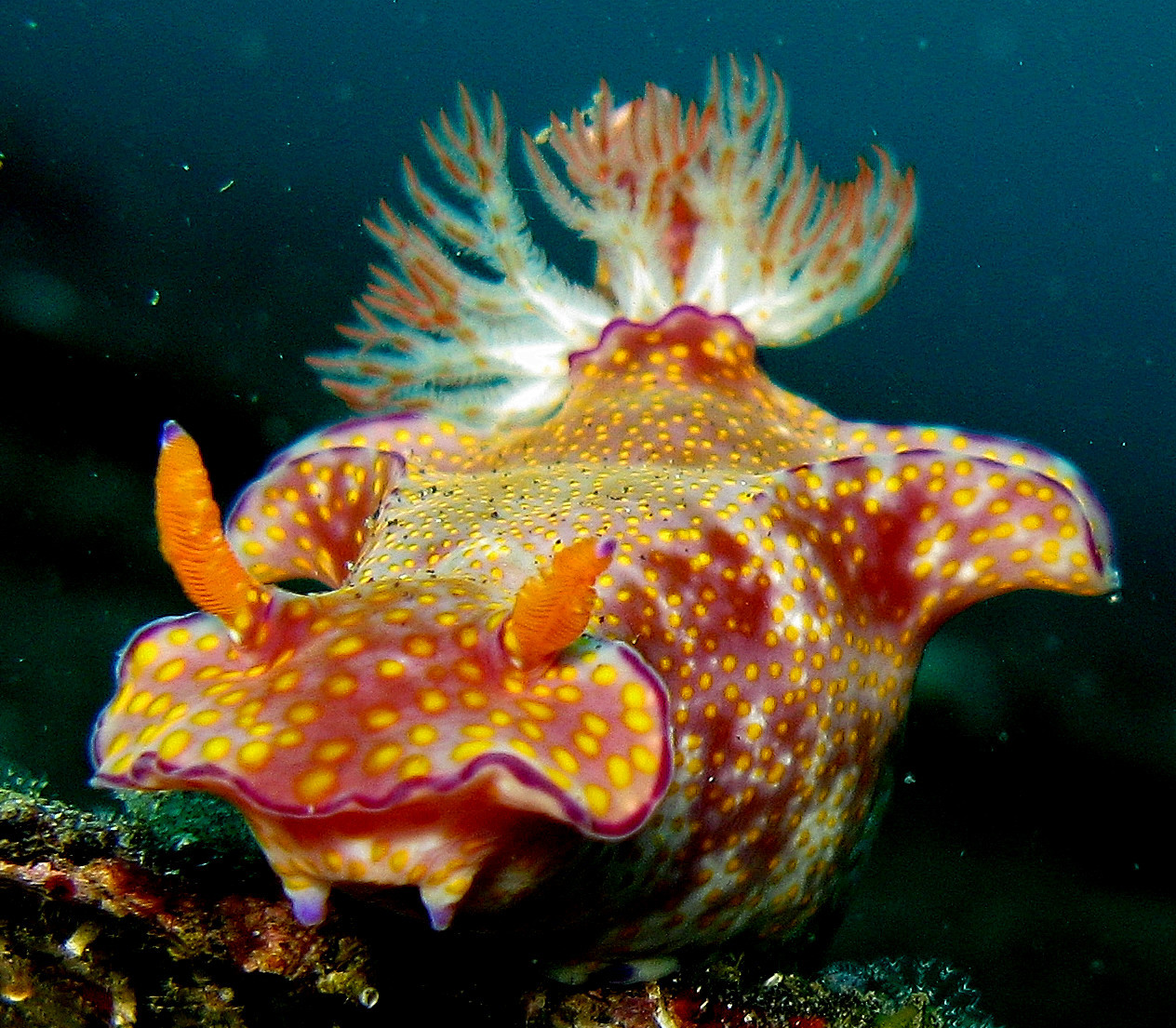
Ceratosoma gracillimum

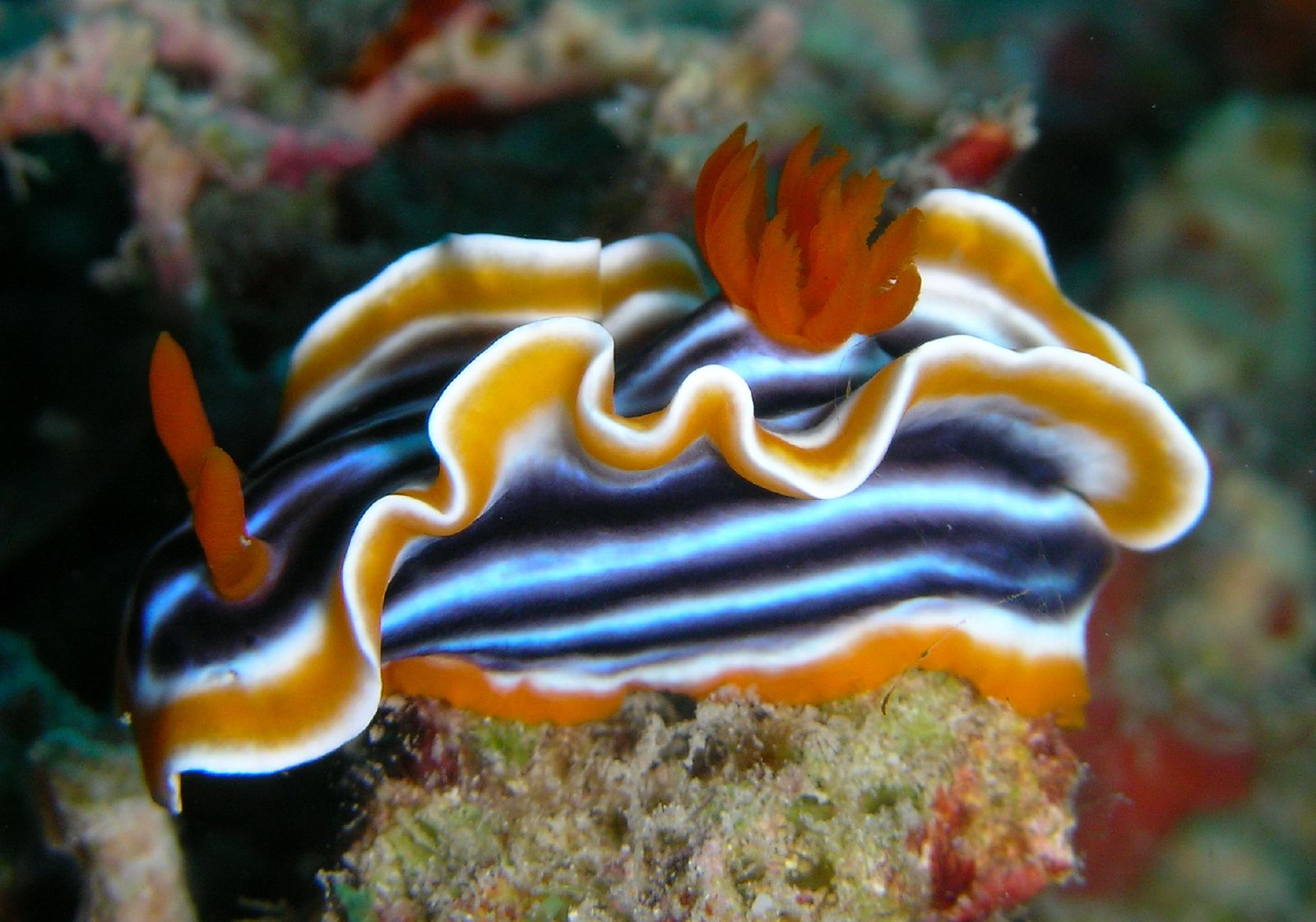
Chromodoris magnifica

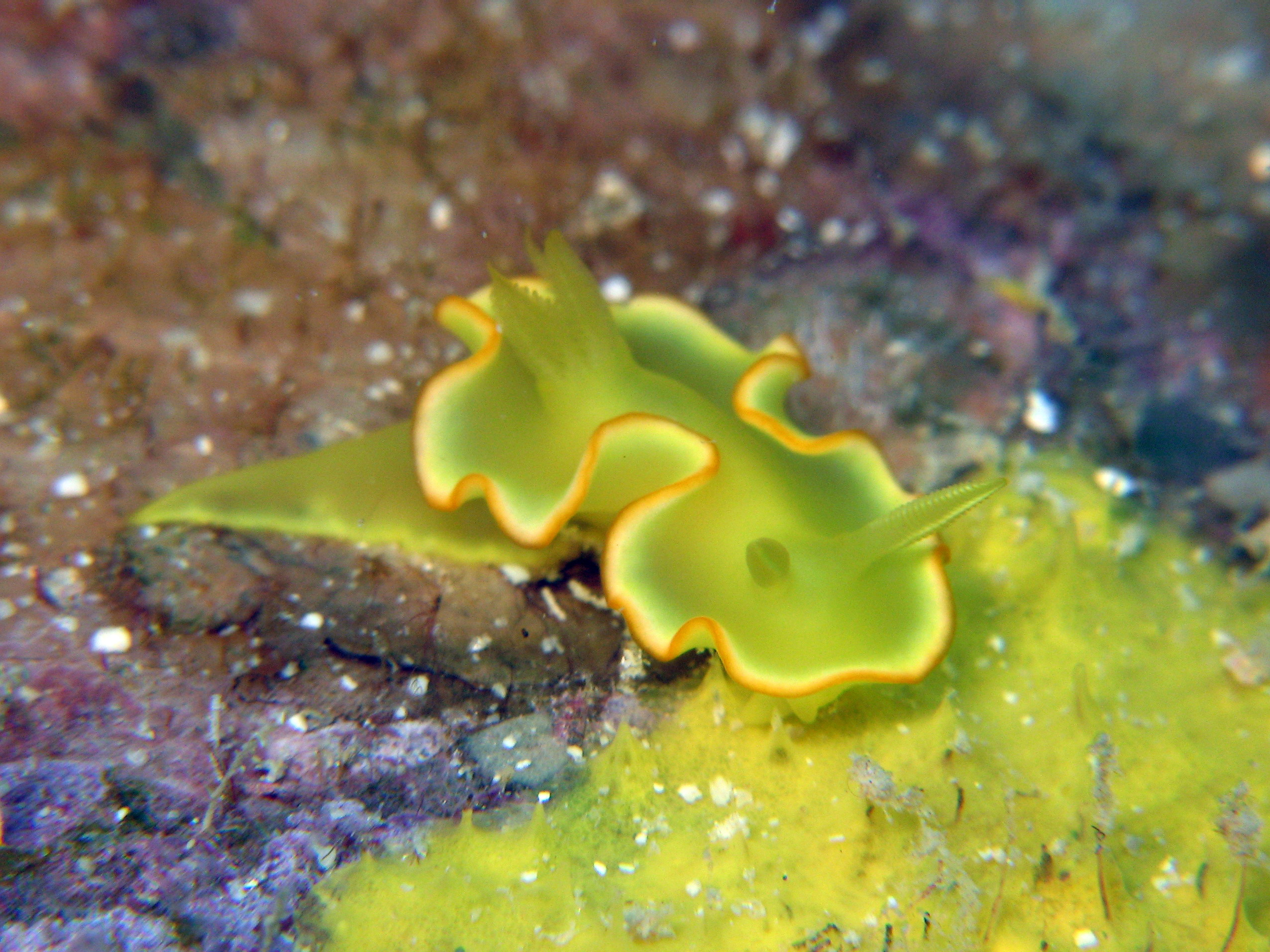
Diversidoris crocea

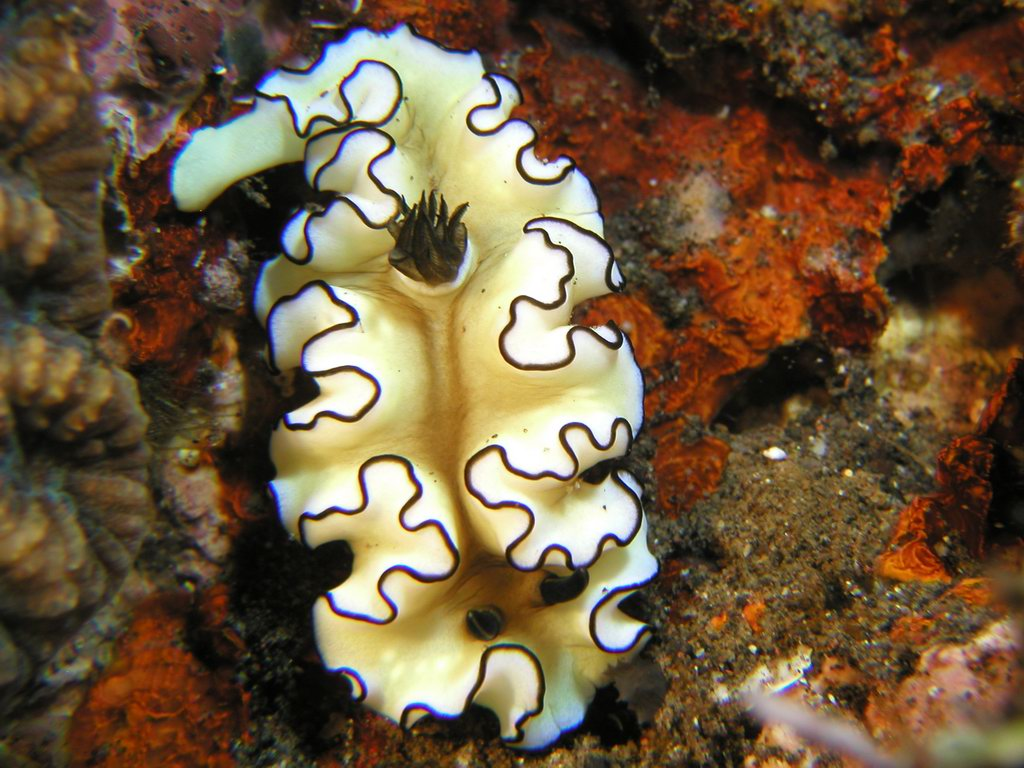
Doriprismatica atromarginata

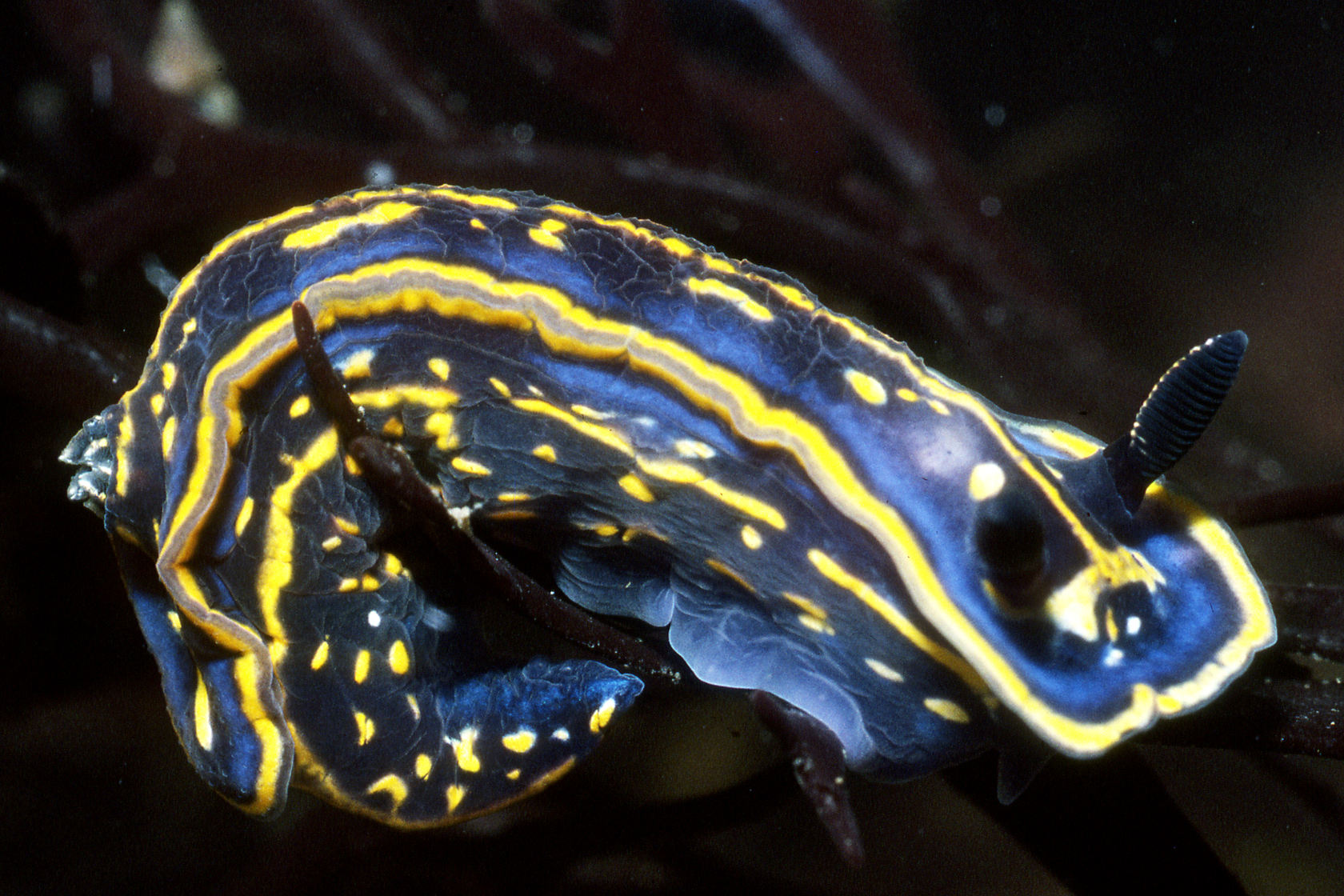
Felimare cantabrica

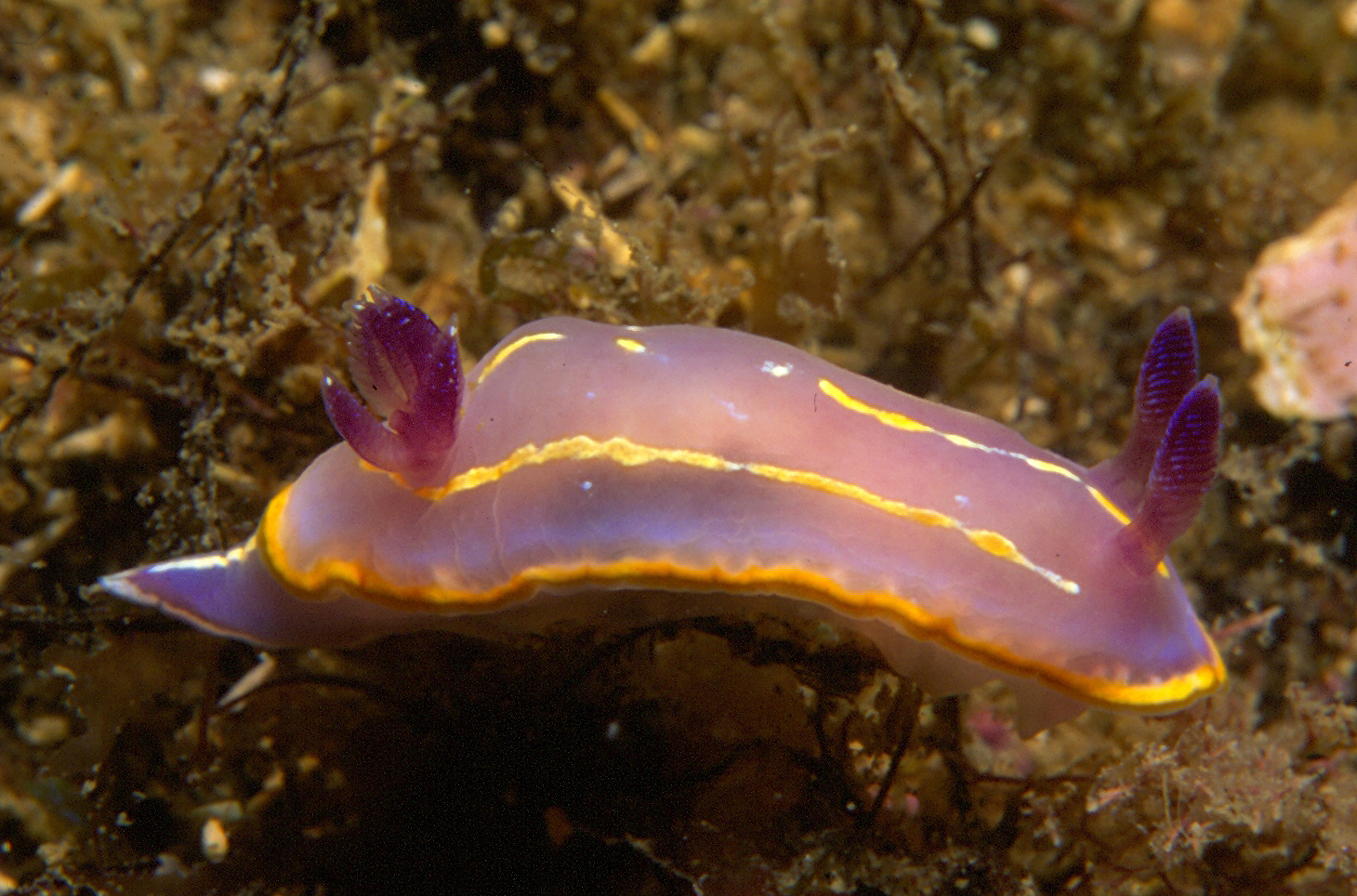
Rudmania krohni

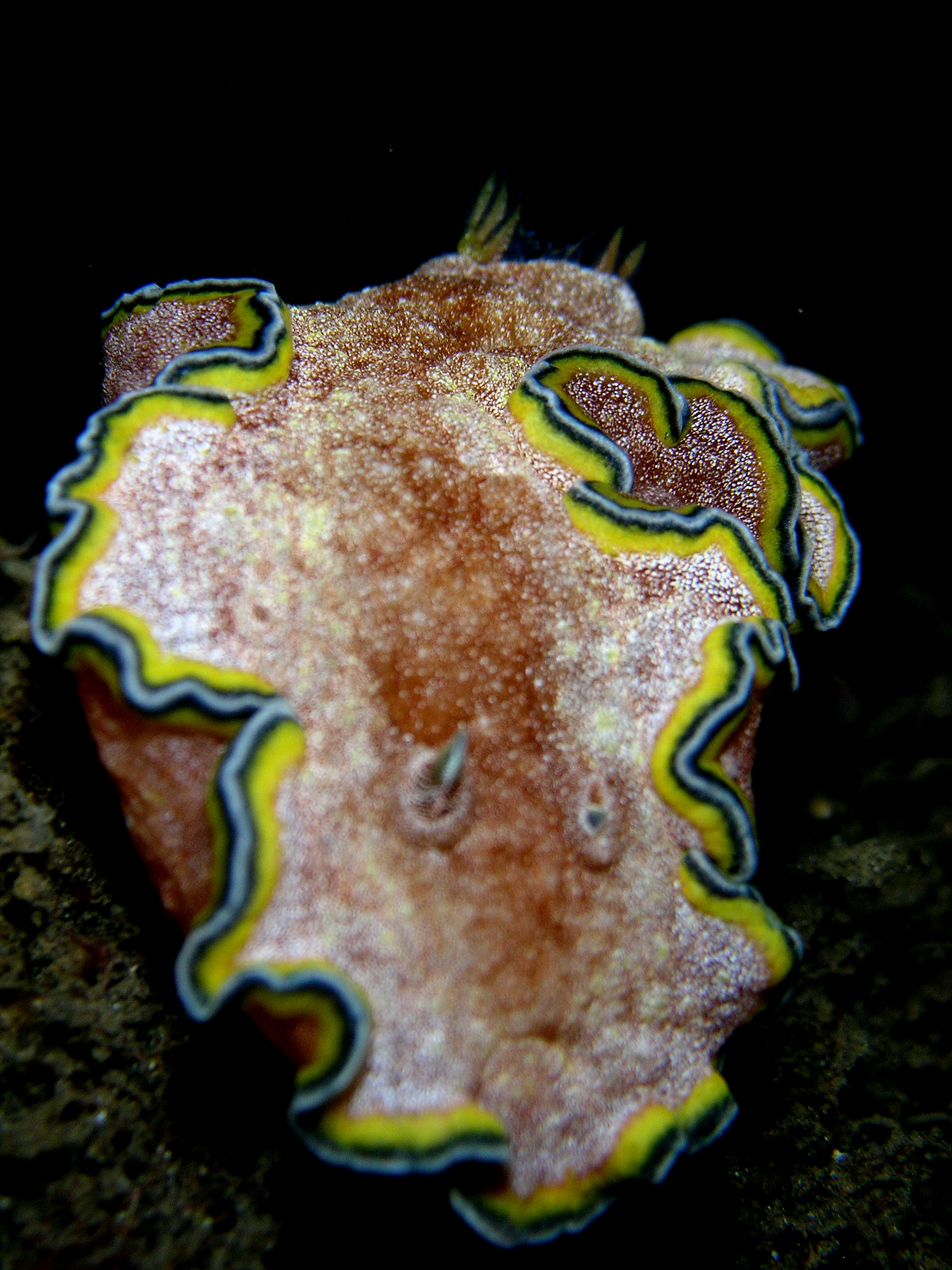
Glossodoris cincta complex

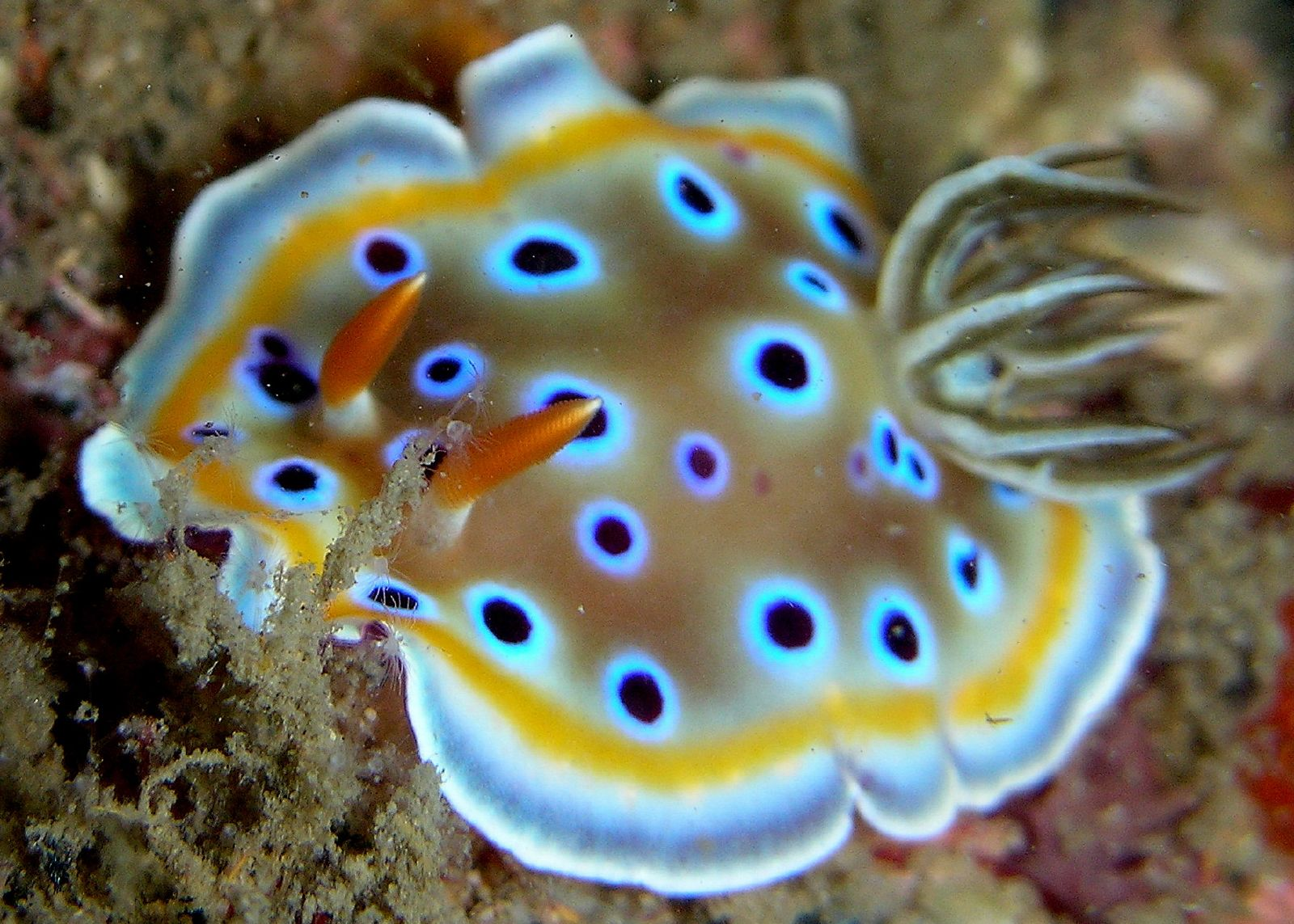
Goniobranchus geminus

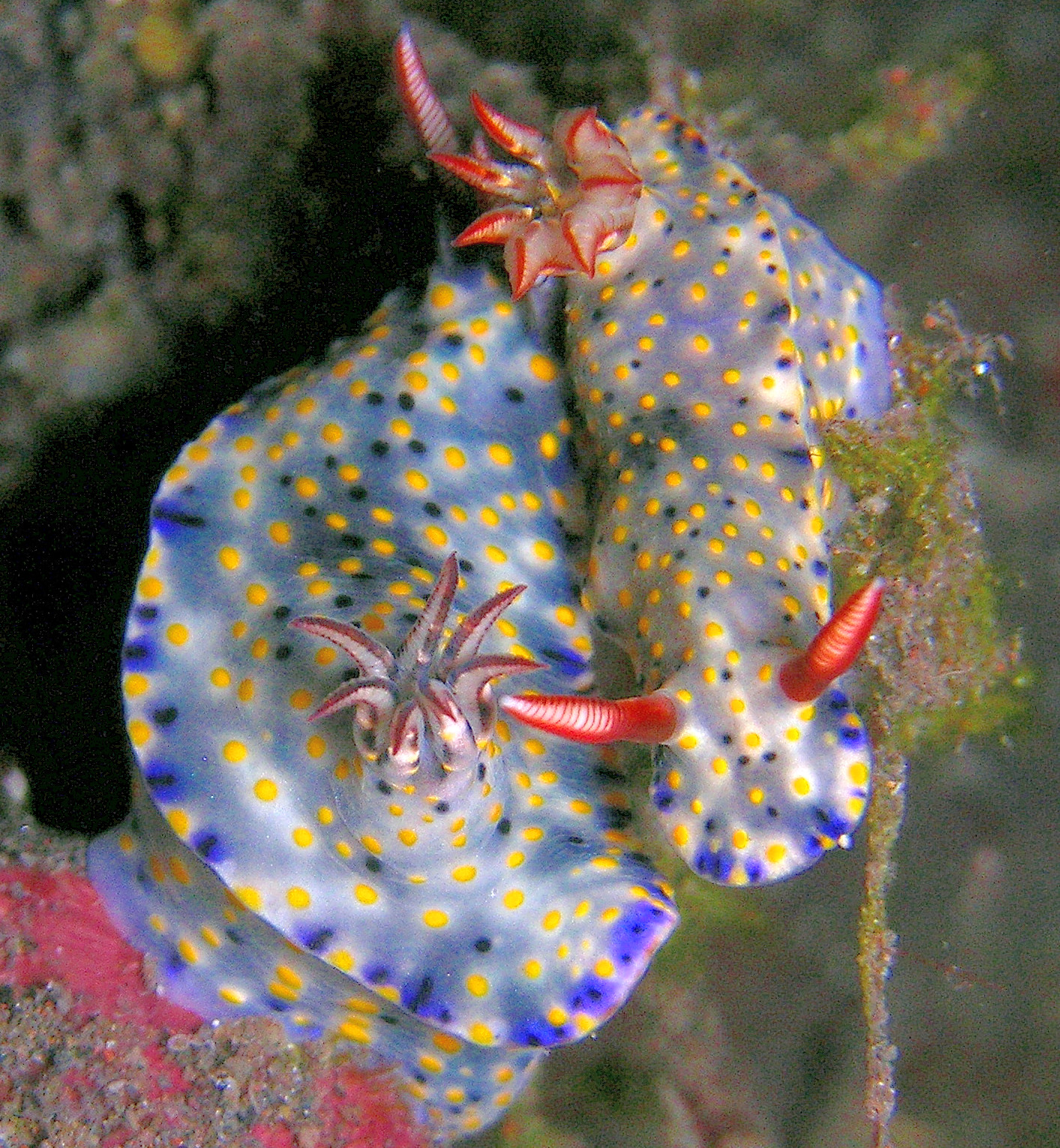
Hypselodoris confetti (left) and Hypselodoris roo (right)

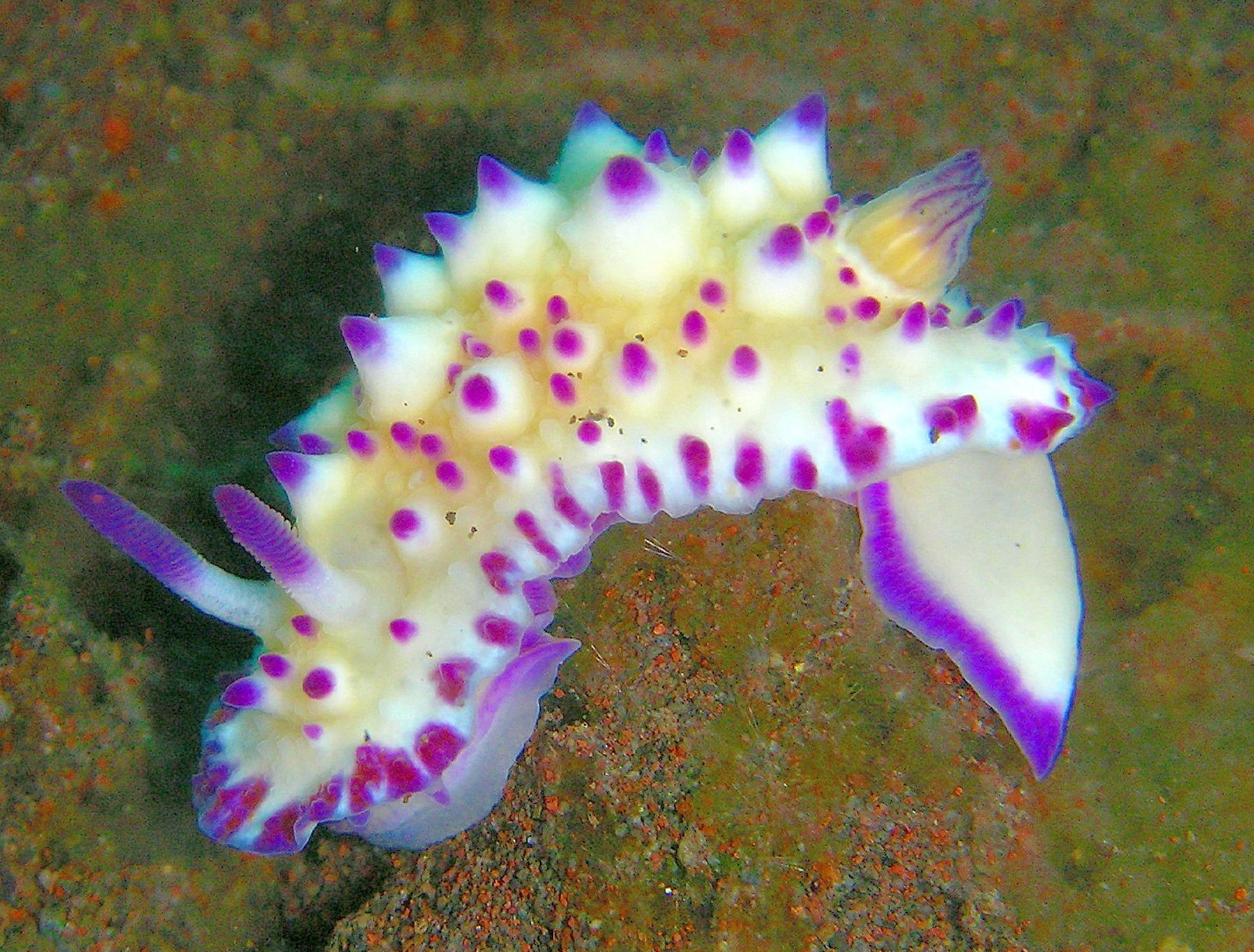
Mexichromis multituberculata

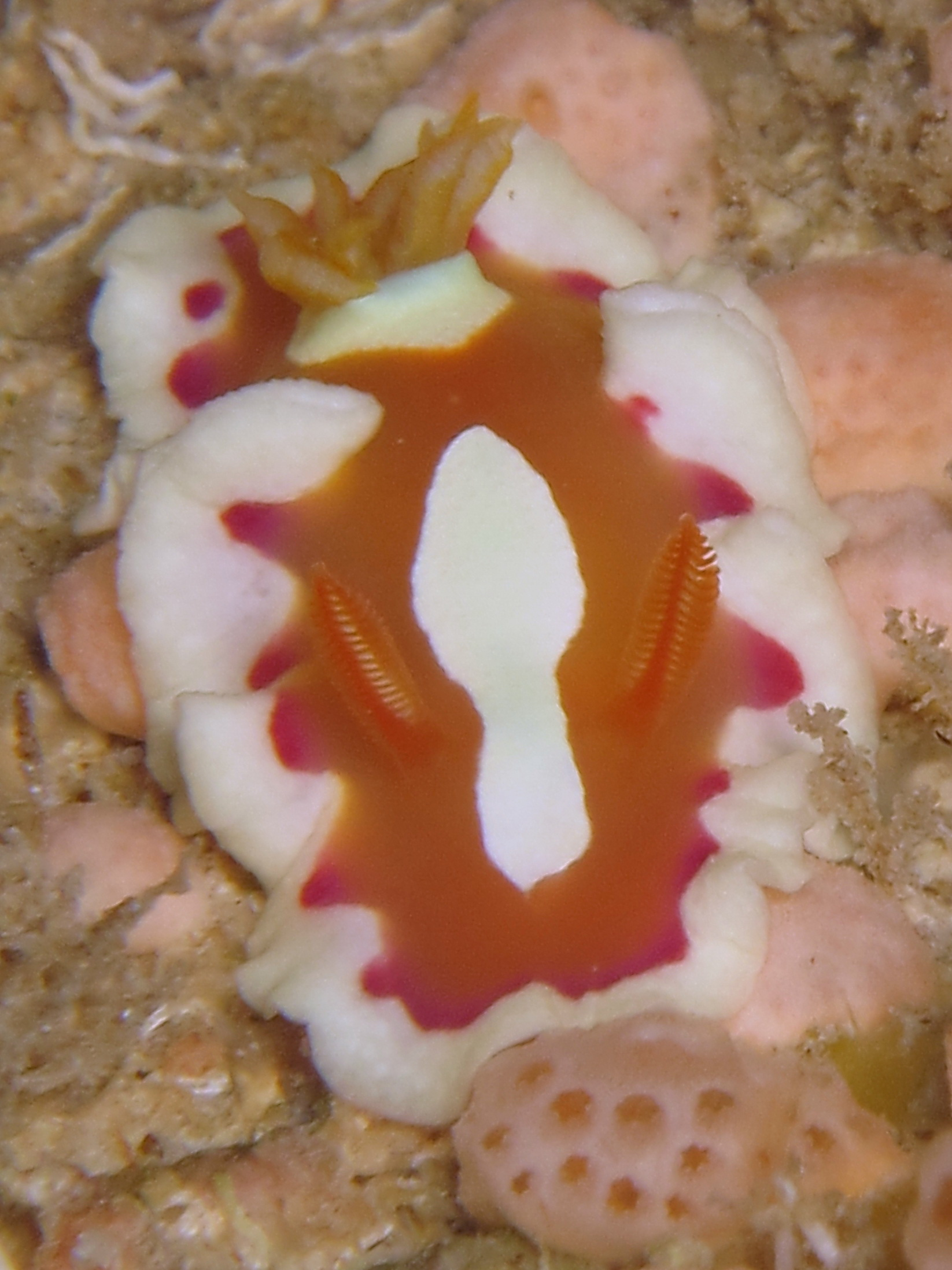
Verconia norba

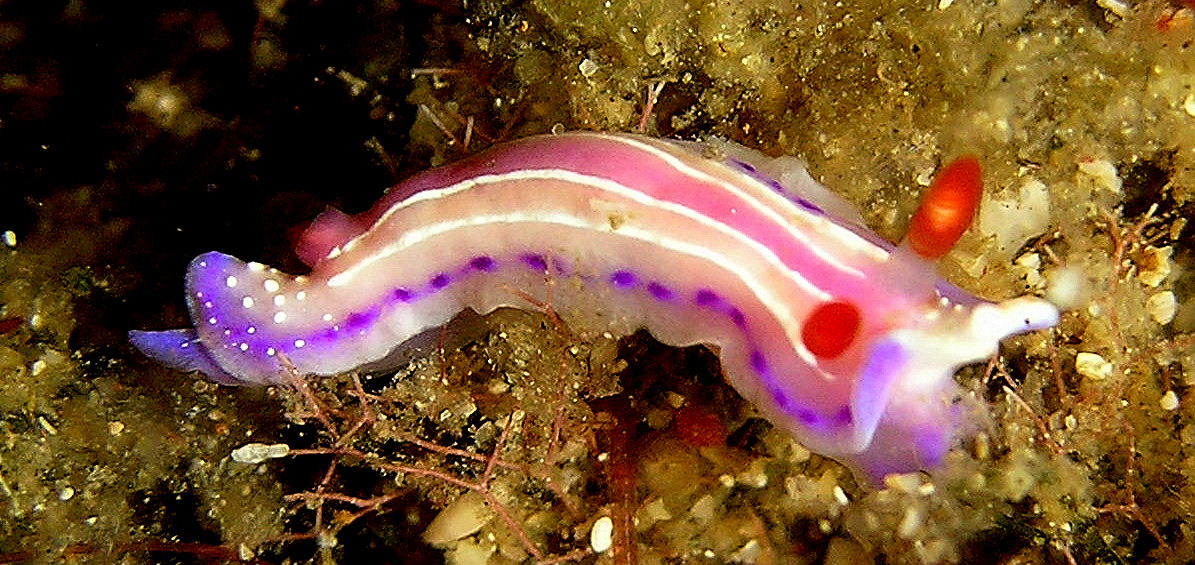
Thorunna sp.
