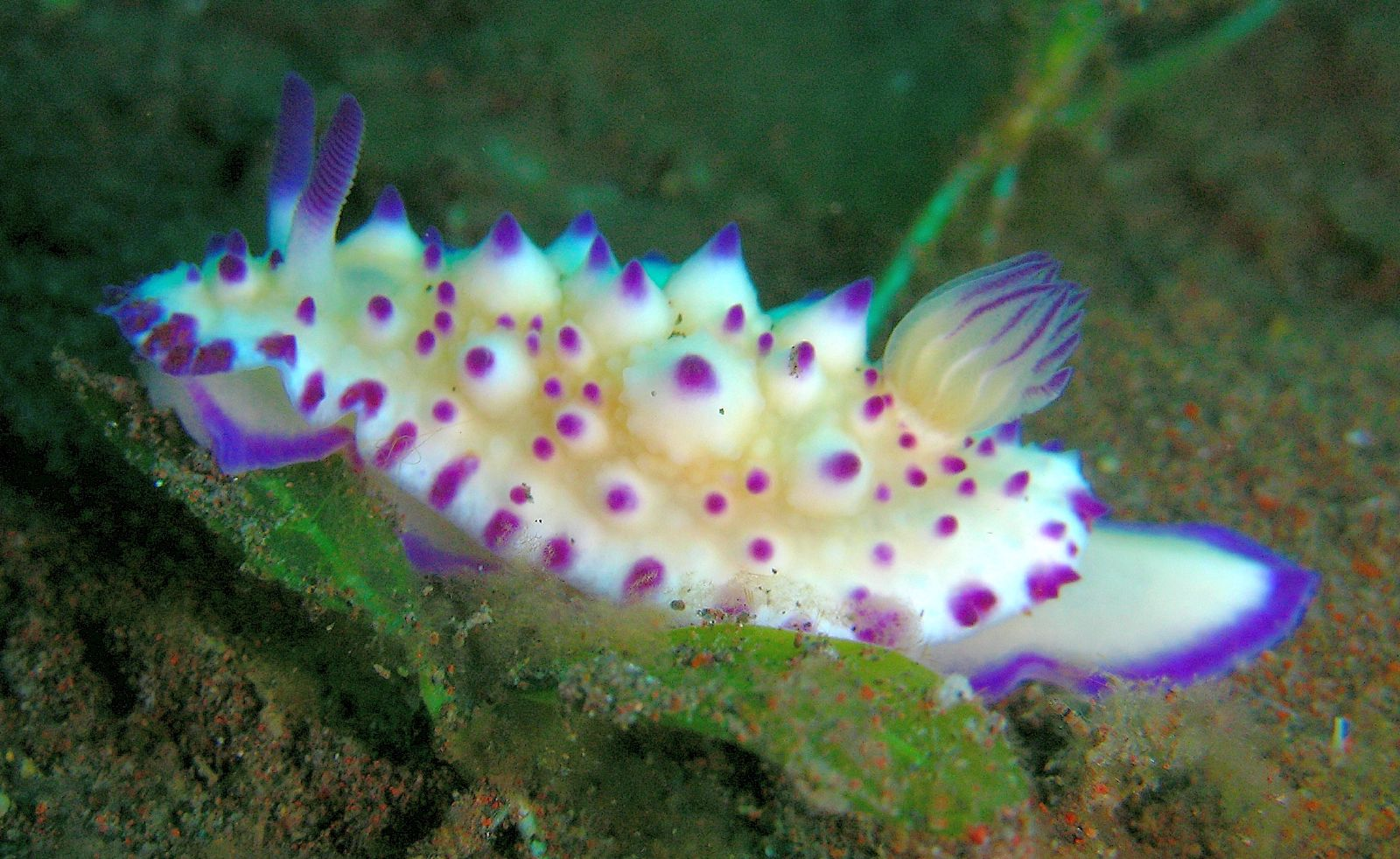
- Mexichromis multituberculata, anterior end towards the upper left

Scientific classification
- Kingdom: Animalia
- Phylum: Mollusca
- Class: Gastropoda
- Order: Nudibranchia
- Family: Chromodorididae
- Genus: Mexichromis; Bertsch, 1977

Type species
- Mexichromis antonii (Bertsch, 1976)

Synonyms
- Durvilledoris Rudman, 1984; Pectenodoris Rudman, 1984

= Mexichromis =

Genus of gastropods

Mexichromis is a genus of colourful sea slugs, dorid nudibranchs, shell-less marine gastropod mollusks in the subfamily Miamirinae of the family Chromodorididae. Current synonymy follows a revision of Chromodorididae which used molecular phylogeny.

== Distribution ==
The genus Mexichromis is represented in the Eastern Pacific by five species, Mexichromis antonii, Mexichromis amalguae, Mexichromis porterae, Mexichromis tica and Mexichromis tura. In the central Indo-Pacific region there are three groups of species, Mexichromis festiva, Mexichromis katalexis, Mexichromis macropus, Mexichromis mariei and Mexichromis multituberculata, all with compact bodies and large dorsal tubercles, Mexichromis aurora and Mexichromis trilineata which were formerly placed in the genus Pectenodoris because of their radula morphology, plus Mexichromis lemniscata, Mexichromis pusilla, Mexichromis albofimbria, Mexichromis circumflava and Mexichromis similaris with long, narrow bodies, which were formerly placed in the genus Durvilledoris.

== Species ==
Species in the genus Mexichromis include:

- Mexichromis albofimbria Rudman, 1995
- Mexichromis antonii (Bertsch, 1976)
- Mexichromis aurora (R.F. Johnson & Gosliner, 1998)
- Mexichromis circumflava Rudman, 1990
- Mexichromis festiva (Angas, 1864)
- Mexichromis katalexis Yonow, 2001
- Mexichromis lemniscata (Quoy & Gaimard, 1832)
- Mexichromis macropus Rudman, 1983
- Mexichromis mariei (Crosse, 1872)
- Mexichromis multituberculata (Baba, 1953)
- Mexichromis pusilla (Bergh, 1874)
- Mexichromis similaris (Rudman, 1986)
- Mexichromis tica Gosliner, Ortea & Valdés, 2004
- Mexichromis trilineata (A. Adams & Reeve, 1850)
- Mexichromis tura (Marcus & Marcus, 1967)

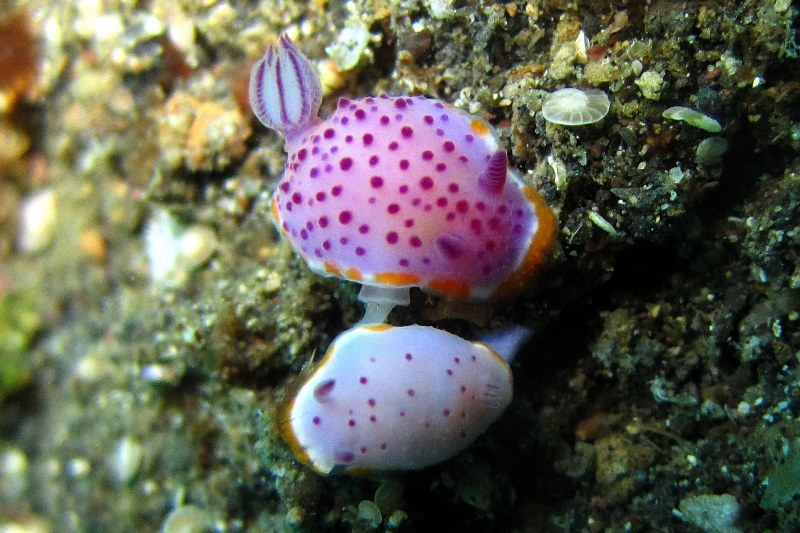
A pair of Mexichromis mariei mating

Species brought into synonymy

- Mexichromis amalguae Gosliner & Bertsch, 1988: synonym of Felimare amalguae
- Mexichromis francoisae Bouchet & Ortea, 1980: synonym of Neptunazurea francoisae
- Mexichromis garciagomezi Ortea & Á. Valdés, 1996 : synonym of Neptunazurea garciagomezi
- Mexichromis kempfi Ev. Marcus, 1971: synonym of Neptunazurea kempfi
- Mexichromis molloi Ortea & Valdés, 1996: synonym of Neptunazurea molloi
- Mexichromis nyalya Ev. Marcus & Er. Marcus, 1967: synonym of Felimare nyalya
- Mexichromis paulomirpuri Ortea & Moro, 2018: synonym of Neptunazurea paulomirpuri
- Mexichromis porterae Cockerell, 1902: synonym of Neptunazurea porterae
- Mexichromis tricolor Cantraine, 1835 : synonym of Felimare tricolor
