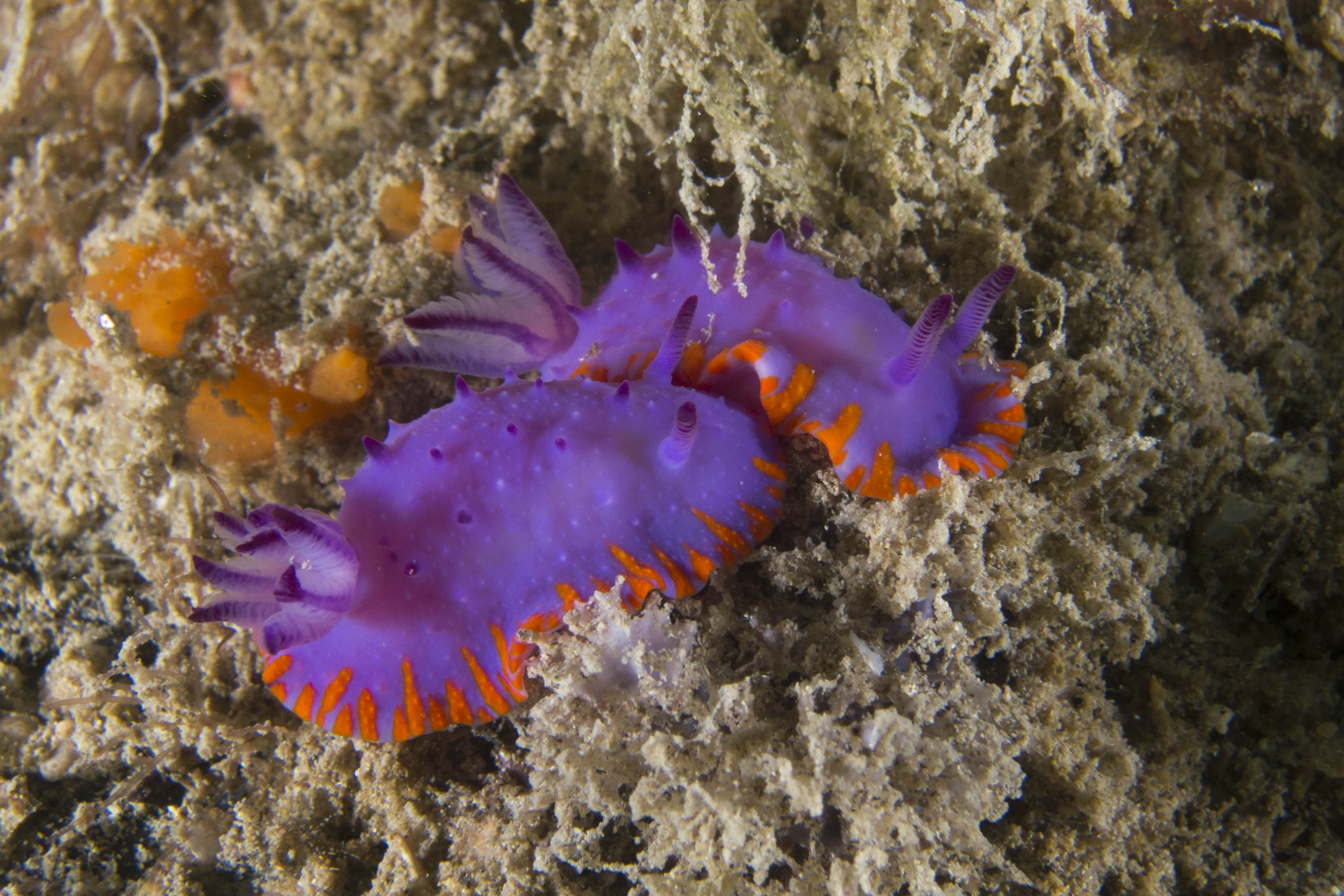

Scientific classification
- Kingdom: Animalia
- Phylum: Mollusca
- Class: Gastropoda
- Order: Nudibranchia
- Family: Chromodorididae
- Genus: Mexichromis
- Species: M. macropus

Binomial name
- Mexichromis macropus Rudman, 1983

= Mexichromis macropus =

Species of gastropod

Mexichromis macropus is a species of sea slug, a dorid nudibranch, a shell-less marine gastropod mollusk in the family Chromodorididae.

== Distribution ==
This species is recorded from temperate and subtropical Australia including SW Western Australia, South Australia, Tasmania, Victoria, New South Wales and southern Queensland.

== Description ==
Mexichromis macropus has a mantle border decorated with radially arranged orange or yellow-orange stripes rather than spots, as in Mexichromis katalexis or continuous lines as in Mexichromis mariei. The mantle ranges in colour from white to pink-purple and has scattered pointed papillae tipped in purple.

== Ecology ==
This species feeds on a sponge in the genus Dysidea.
