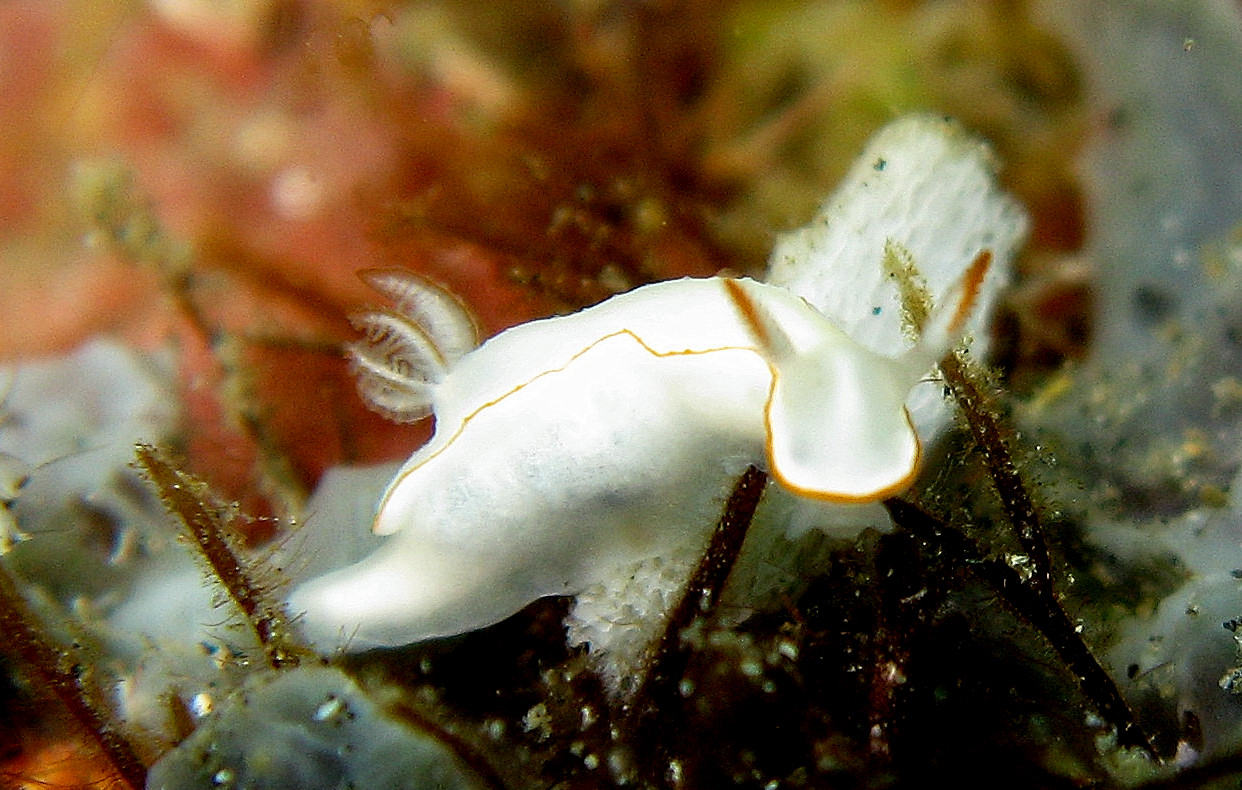
- A live individual of Thorunna furtiva, head end towards the right and turned towards the camera

Scientific classification
- Kingdom: Animalia
- Phylum: Mollusca
- Class: Gastropoda
- Order: Nudibranchia
- Family: Chromodorididae
- Genus: Thorunna; Bergh, 1878

Synonyms
- Babaina Odhner in Franc, 1968; Digidentis Rudman, 1984

= Thorunna =

Genus of gastropods

Thorunna is a genus of sea slugs, dorid nudibranchs, shell-less marine gastropod mollusks in the subfamily Miamirinae of the family Chromodorididae.

== Description ==
The genus Thorunna contains chromodorid nudibranchs with a distinctive radula, which is very small and has 17-25 teeth in a half-row. The lateral teeth are long slender shafts with bluntly bifid tips. Species in this genus rarely exceed 20 mm (0.79 in) and wriggle or vibrate their gills rhythmically. Anatomically the buccal bulb is very small relative to most chromodorids and the oral tube very long.

== Species ==
Species in the genus Thorunna include:

- Thorunna africana Rudman, 1984
- Thorunna arbuta (Burn, 1961)
- Thorunna australis Risbec, 1928
- Thorunna daniellae Kay & Young, 1969
- Thorunna florens Baba, 1949
- Thorunna furtiva Bergh, 1878
- Thorunna halourga Johnson & Gosliner, 2001
- Thorunna horologia Rudman, 1984
- Thorunna kahuna Johnson & Gosliner, 2001
- Thorunna montrouzieri Rudman, 1995
- Thorunna perplexa Burn, 1957
- Thorunna punicea Rudman, 1995
- Thorunna purpuropedis Rudman & Johnson, 1985
- Thorunna speciosa Rudman, 1990
- Thorunna talaverai Ortea, Bacallado & Valdés, 1992
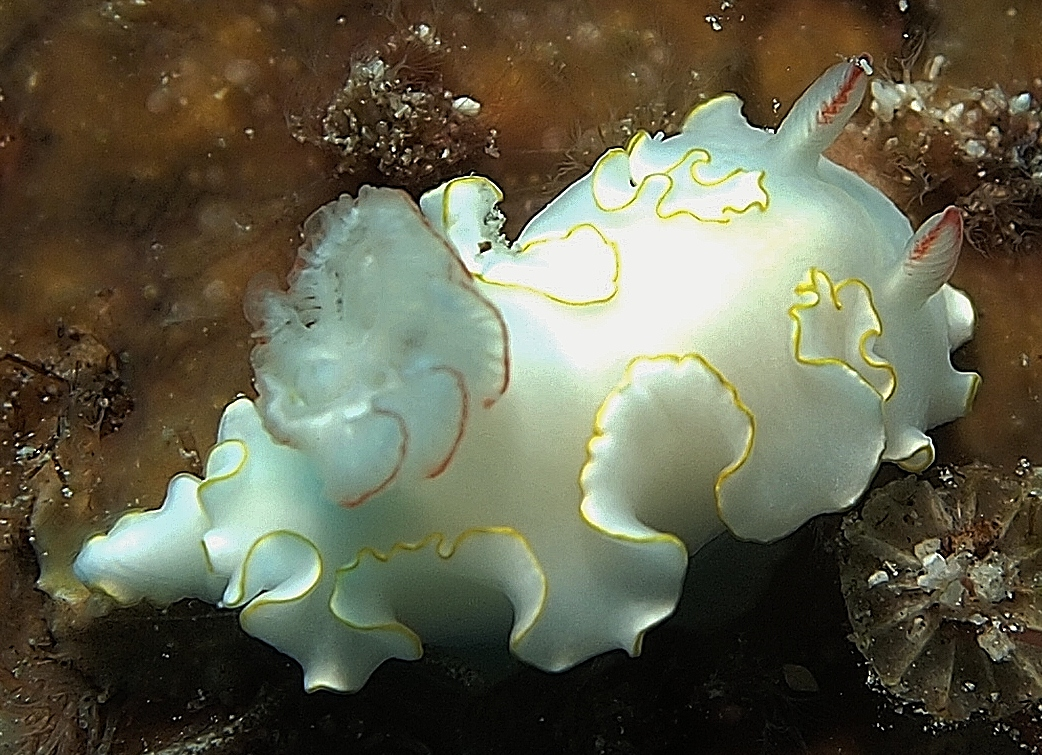
Thorunna africana

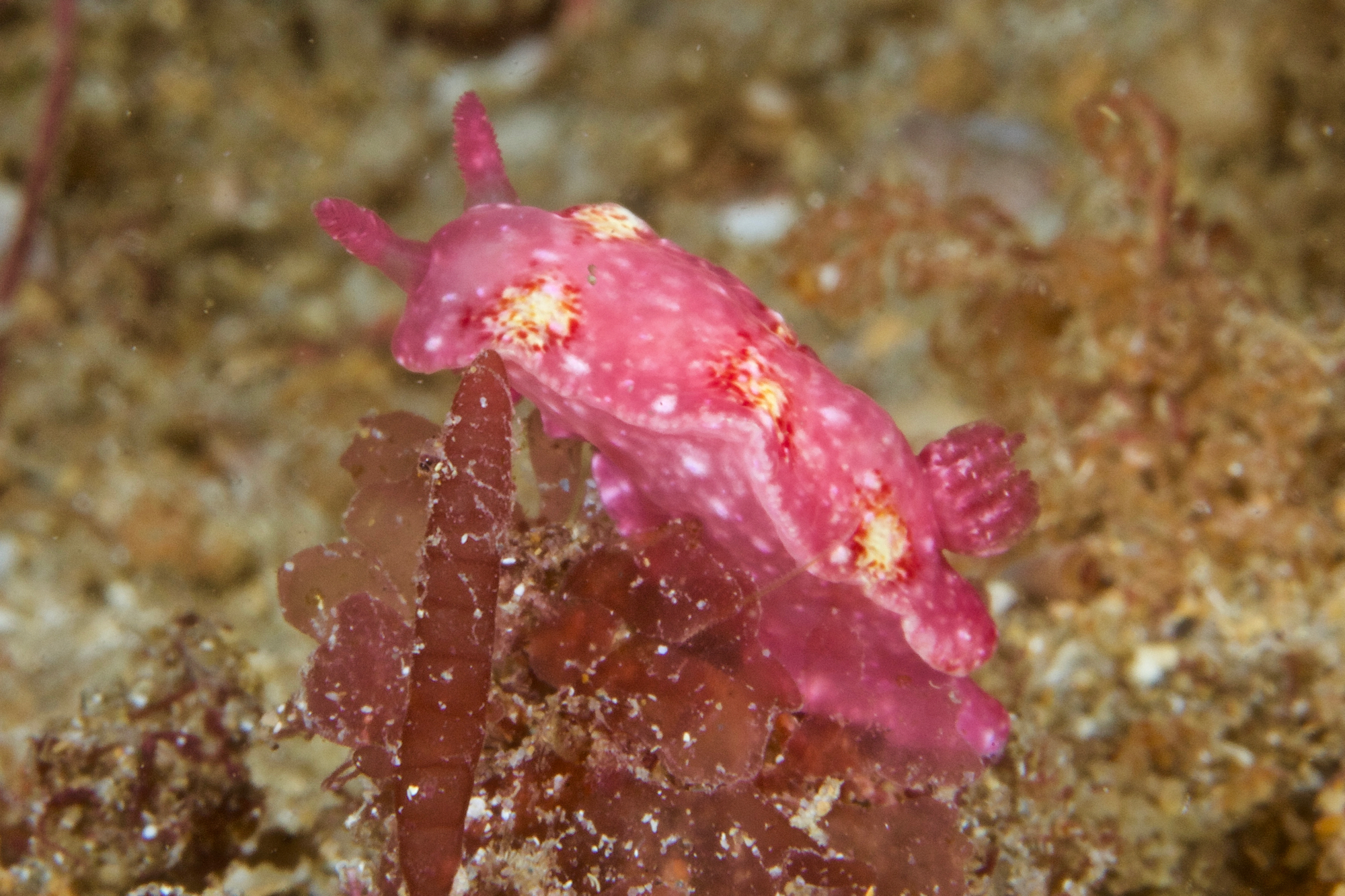
Thorunna arbuta

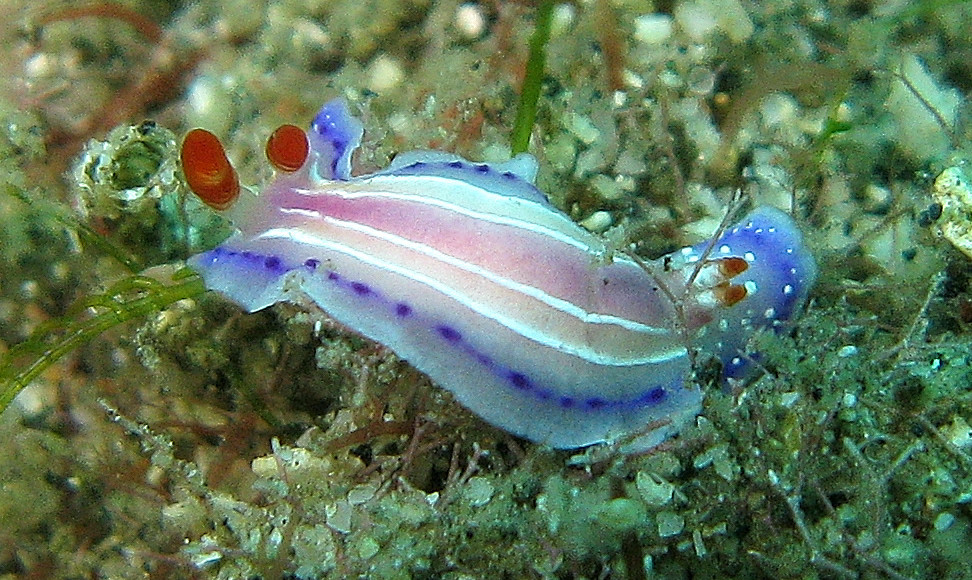
Thorunna florens

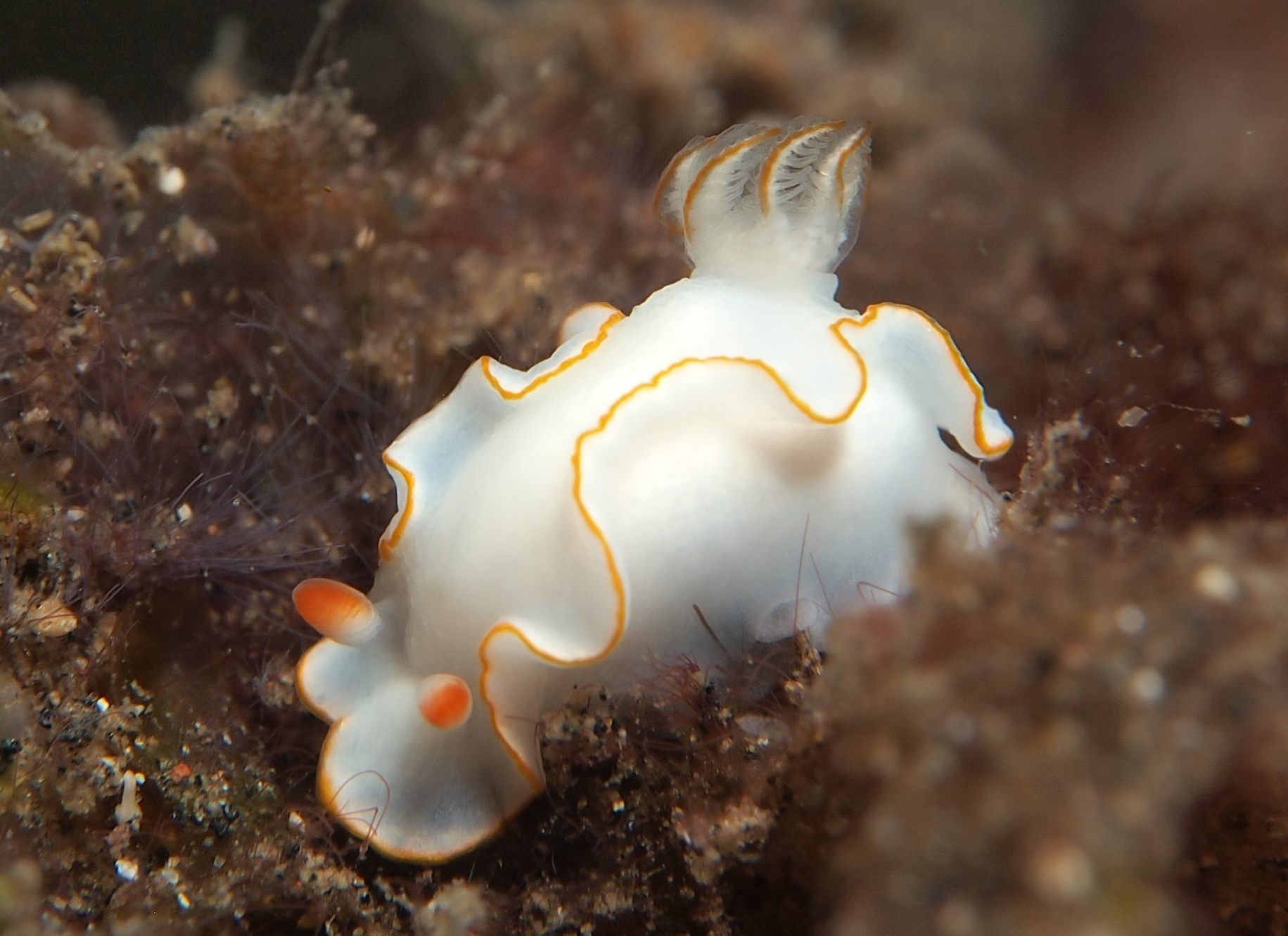
Thorunna furtiva

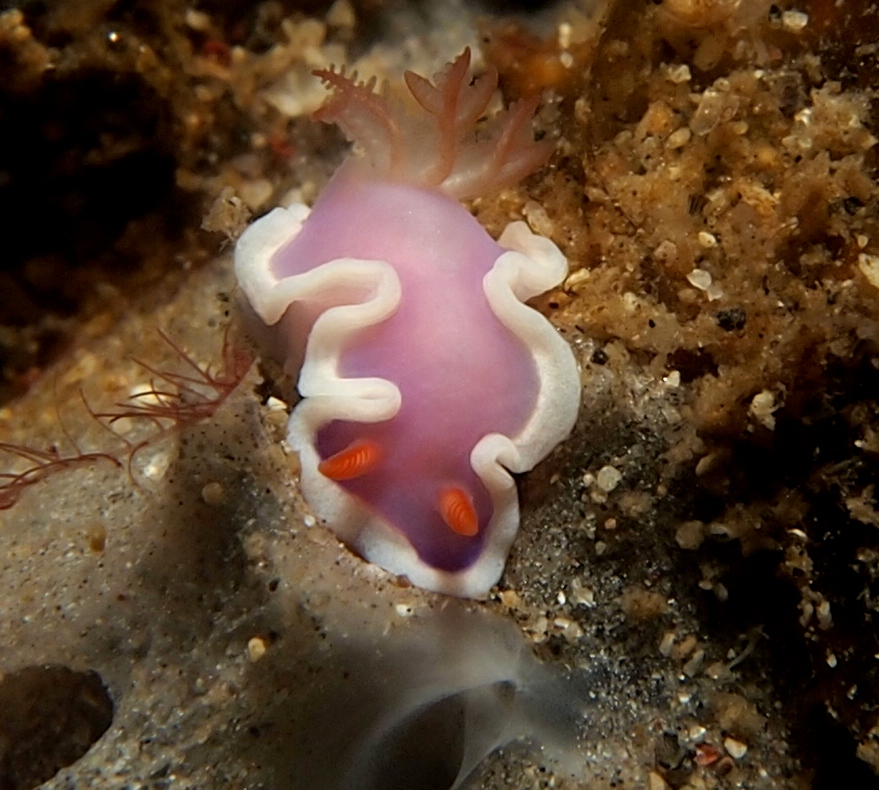
Thorunna halourga

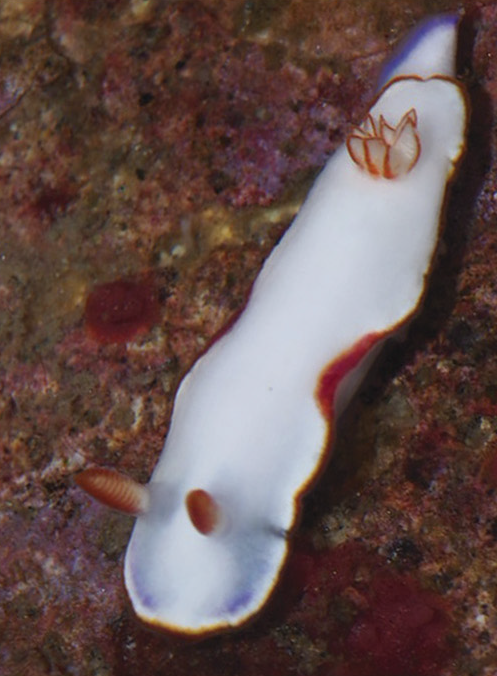
Thorunna horologia

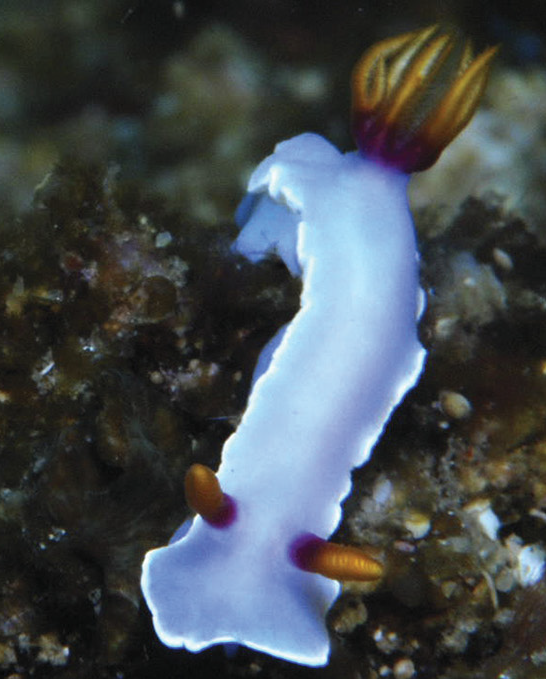
Thorunna punicea

Species brought into synonymy

- Thorunna decussata Risbec, 1928: synonym of Verconia decussata
- Thorunna lapislazuli Bertsch & Ferreira, 1974: synonym of Felimare lapislazuli
- Thorunna scottjohnsoni Bertsch & Gosliner, 1989: synonym of Ardeadoris scottjohnsoni
- Thorunna speciosus Rudman, 1990: synonym of Thorunna speciosa
- Thorunna tura Ev. Marcus & Er. Marcus, 1967: synonym of Mexichromis tura
