= Mexichromis aurora =

Scientific classification
- Kingdom: Animalia
- Phylum: Mollusca
- Class: Gastropoda
- Order: Nudibranchia
- Family: Chromodorididae
- Genus: Mexichromis
- Species: M. aurora

Binomial name
- Mexichromis aurora (Johnson R.F. & Gosliner, 1998)

Synonyms
- Pectenodoris aurora R. F. Johnson & Gosliner, 1998

Species of gastropod

Mexichromis aurora is a species of sea slug or dorid nudibranch, a marine gastropod mollusk in the family Chromodorididae.

== Distribution ==
The holotype of this species was collected at Seragaki Beach, ENE of Maekizaki, Ryukyu Islands, Okinawa, Japan at 58 m (190 ft) depth. Additional specimens from depths as shallow as 10 m (33 ft) from the Ryukyu Islands, Lembeh Strait, north Sulawesi, Indonesia and Maricaban Island, Batangas Province, Luzon Island, Philippines were included in the original description. The distribution is entirely contained within the range of the more common Mexichromis trilineata and both species can be found at the same site.

== Description ==
Originally described in the genus Pectenodoris this species is similar in anatomy and colouration to Mexichromis trilineata. Both of these species share a similar radula, anatomy and colour pattern which was considered sufficiently distinctive to define the genus Pectenodoris but this genus was merged with Mexichromis on the basis of a DNA phylogenetic study. The two species of Pectenodoris form a clade which is sister to the other Mexichromis species.

== Ecology ==
Pectenodoris species feed on species of the sponge Dysidea.
