= Neptunazurea garciagomezi =

Scientific classification
- Kingdom: Animalia
- Phylum: Mollusca
- Class: Gastropoda
- Order: Nudibranchia
- Family: Chromodorididae
- Genus: Neptunazurea
- Species: N. garciagomezi

Binomial name
- Neptunazurea garciagomezi (Ortea & Valdés, 1996)

Synonyms
- Felimare garciagomezi Ortea & Á. Valdés, 1996; Mexichromis garciagomezi Ortea & Valdés, 1996 (basionym)

Species of gastropod

Neptunazurea garciagomezi is a species of colourful sea slug or dorid nudibranch, a marine gastropod mollusc in the family Chromodorididae.

== Taxonomic History ==
This species was described by Edmunds from Ghana as a variation of Hypselodoris tricolor. It was named as a new species in the revision of Ortea et al.

In 2025, it was reassigned to the new genus Neptunazurea. Despite not having a strong association of molecular data with others in the genus, it along with Neptunazurea molloi and Neptunazurea paulomirpuri were included purely based on possession of internal and external morphology diagnostic to the genus. Ribeiro et al. (2025) also remarks that "it remains unclear whether N. garciagomezi and N. paulomirpuri are truly distinct from Neptunazurea francoisae.
