= Mexichromis similaris =

Scientific classification
- Kingdom: Animalia
- Phylum: Mollusca
- Class: Gastropoda
- Order: Nudibranchia
- Family: Chromodorididae
- Genus: Mexichromis
- Species: M. similaris

Binomial name
- Mexichromis similaris (Rudman, 1986)

Synonyms
- Durvilledoris similaris Rudman, 1986 (basionym)

Species of gastropod

Mexichromis similaris is a species of sea slug or dorid nudibranch, a marine gastropod mollusk in the family Chromodorididae.

== Distribution ==
This nudibranch is found in the tropical Western Pacific Ocean.

== Description ==
Mexichromis similaris has a pale-lilac or violet body, with pale-orange gills and rhinophores. The mantle is edged with a white band, and there is a long white line running down its dorsum. This species is easily confused with other similarly coloured nudibranchs, especially Hypselodoris shimodaensis and Mexichromis trilineata.

This nudibranch can reach a total length of at least 14 mm, and like all Chromodorids, feeds on sponges.
