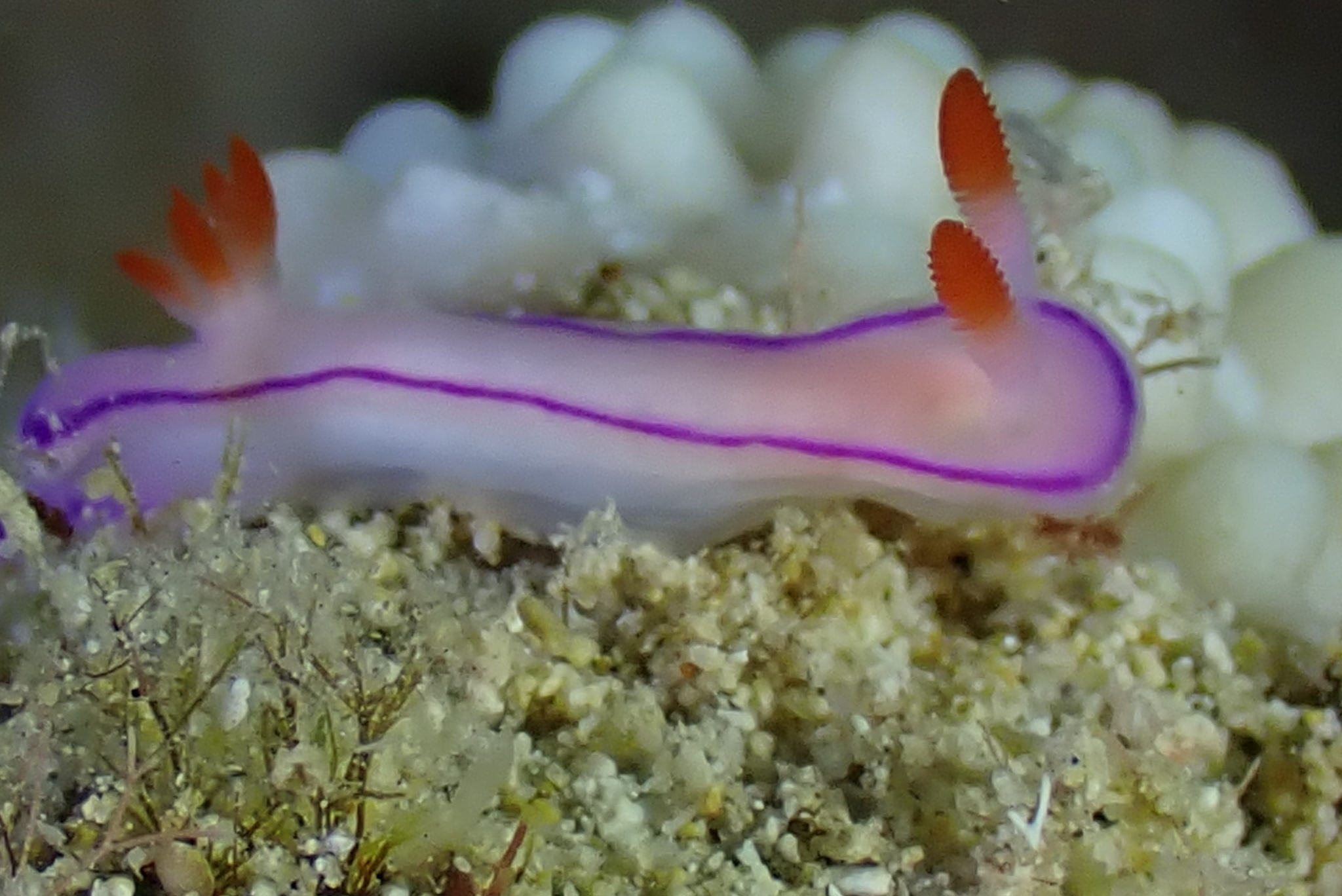

Scientific classification
- Kingdom: Animalia
- Phylum: Mollusca
- Class: Gastropoda
- Order: Nudibranchia
- Family: Chromodorididae
- Genus: Thorunna
- Species: T. kahuna

Binomial name
- Thorunna kahuna Johnson R.F. & Gosliner, 2001

= Thorunna kahuna =

Species of sea slug

Thorunna kahuna is a species of sea slug, a dorid nudibranch, a shell-less marine gastropod mollusk in the family Chromodorididae.

== Distribution ==
This marine species occurs off Hawaii.

== Description ==
This species is translucent pinkish-white with a magenta submarginal line on the mantle. On the back foot it has two dark purple lines. The rhinophores have translucent pink stalks and orange-red clubs while the gills are orange-red with translucent pink bases. There are prominent, opaque-white mantle glands around the posterior margin of the mantle and, occasionally, in front of the rhinophores which help distinguish it from the very similar Thorunna daniellae. Adult specimens are about 10–16 mm (0.39–0.63 in) long.

== Ecology ==
This species feeds on sponges of the genus Dysidea.
