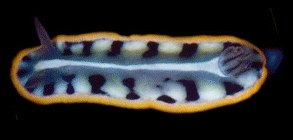
- Neptunazurea kempfi

Scientific classification
- Kingdom: Animalia
- Phylum: Mollusca
- Class: Gastropoda
- Order: Nudibranchia
- Family: Chromodorididae
- Genus: Neptunazurea; Ribeiro, García-Méndez, Valdés, Schrödl & Padula, 2025

Type species
- Neptunazurea kempfi Ev. Marcus, 1971

= Neptunazurea =

Genus of gastropods

Neptunazurea is a genus of sea slugs, dorid nudibranchs, shell-less marine gastropod mollusks in the in family Chromodorididae.

== Taxonomic history ==
Neptunazurea was established after analysis of several small blue species previously placed in Felimare. There had never been a clear set of diagnostics for Felimare, as the genus was re-established as a result of molecular phylogenetic analysis only; morphological features were not taken into account. The species then included in Felimare (placed previously in Hypselodoris and Mexichromis) shared neither external and internal anatomies nor reproductive morphologies.

In Ribeiro et al. (2025), a study was done re-investigating Felimare with special focus on the blue, smaller species of the Eastern Pacific and Atlantic oceans. Both molecular and morphological analyses performed, and a distinct, consistent set of diagnostic material was able to be established. Thus, Neptunazurea was proposed as a new genus within Chromodorididae.

== Species ==
Species within Neptunazurea include:

- Neptunazurea francoisae Bouchet, 1981
- Neptunazurea garciagomezi Ortea & Á. Valdés, 1996
- Neptunazurea kempfi Ev. Marcus, 1971
- Neptunazurea molloi Ortea & Á. Valdés, 1996
- Neptunazurea paulomirpuri Ortea & Moro, 2018
- Neptunazurea porterae T. D. A. Cockerell, 1901
- Neptunazurea sisalensis Ortigosa & Á. Valdés, 2012

== Description ==
Neptunazurea are small chromodorids that can grow up to 30mm long. Their bodies are elongate and narrow, with sides of foot generally not visible on account of a smooth mantle. All species have a mantle that is blue or white, with a white or pale blue "single central longitudinal line". The mantle is edged with a single narrow band that can be yellow, orange, or white. The rhinophores are blue and lamellate. The gills are small, with blue rachis and blue or translucent white leaves.

The oral tube is three times as long as the buccal bulb. There are "mole-paw shaped jaw rodlets", and the radula are very in comparison to body length. There is a short, undifferentiated prostate, a large vagine, and a short, wide uterine duct.
