= Thorunna perplexa =

Scientific classification
- Kingdom: Animalia
- Phylum: Mollusca
- Class: Gastropoda
- Order: Nudibranchia
- Family: Chromodorididae
- Genus: Thorunna
- Species: T. perplexa

Binomial name
- Thorunna perplexa (Burn, 1957)

Synonyms
- Glossodoris perplexa Burn, 1957 (basionym); Digidentis perplexa (Burn, 1957)

Species of gastropod

Thorunna perplexa is a species of sea slug, a dorid nudibranch, a shell-less marine gastropod mollusk in the family Chromodorididae.

== Distribution ==
This species is reported from south-eastern Australia and Tasmania.
