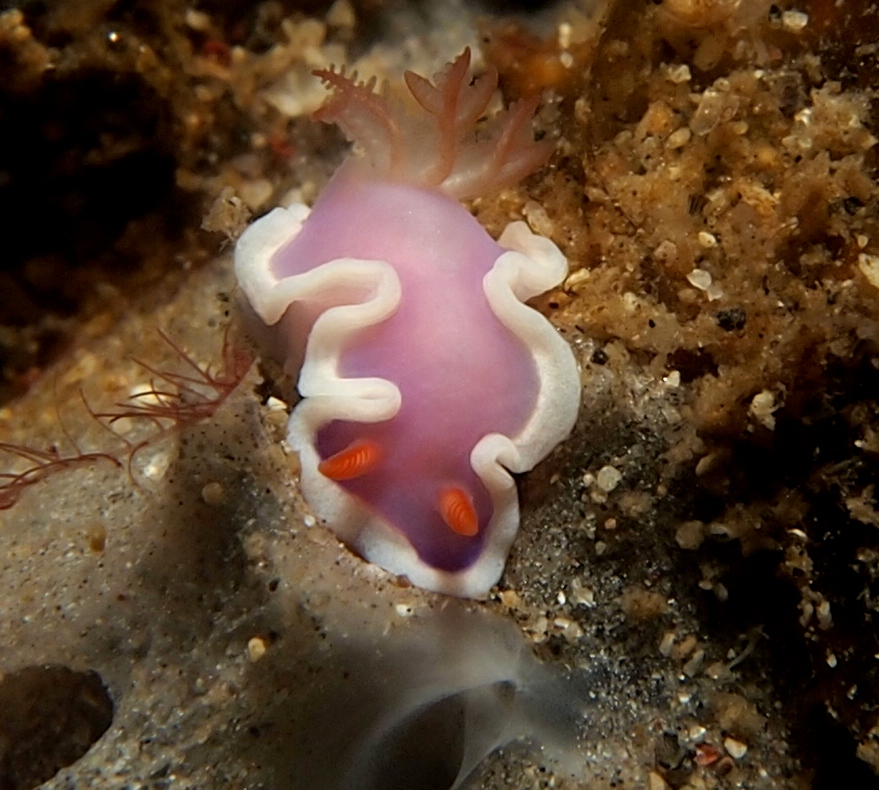

Scientific classification
- Kingdom: Animalia
- Phylum: Mollusca
- Class: Gastropoda
- Order: Nudibranchia
- Family: Chromodorididae
- Genus: Thorunna
- Species: T. halourga

Binomial name
- Thorunna halourga Johnson R.F. & Gosliner, 2001

= Thorunna halourga =

Species of gastropod

Thorunna halourga is a species of sea slug, a dorid nudibranch, a shell-less marine gastropod mollusk in the family Chromodorididae.

== Distribution ==
This species was described from Rasch Passage, Madang, Papua New Guinea and Batangas, Philippines. It has been reported from tropical eastern Australia.

== Description ==
The mantle is a pale lilac becoming purple in front of the rhinophores and behind the gills. The mantle margin, which is slightly undulate, has a broad white band. The rhinophores have a purple stalk and the lamellae are edged with orange. The gills are white with orange axes.
