= Thorunna speciosa =

Scientific classification
- Kingdom: Animalia
- Phylum: Mollusca
- Class: Gastropoda
- Order: Nudibranchia
- Family: Chromodorididae
- Genus: Thorunna
- Species: T. speciosa

Binomial name
- Thorunna speciosa Rudman, 1990

Species of gastropod

Thorunna speciosa is a species of sea slug, a dorid nudibranch, a shell-less marine gastropod mollusk in the family Chromodorididae.

== Distribution ==
This species was described from Halifax Point, Port Stephens, New South Wales, Australia.
