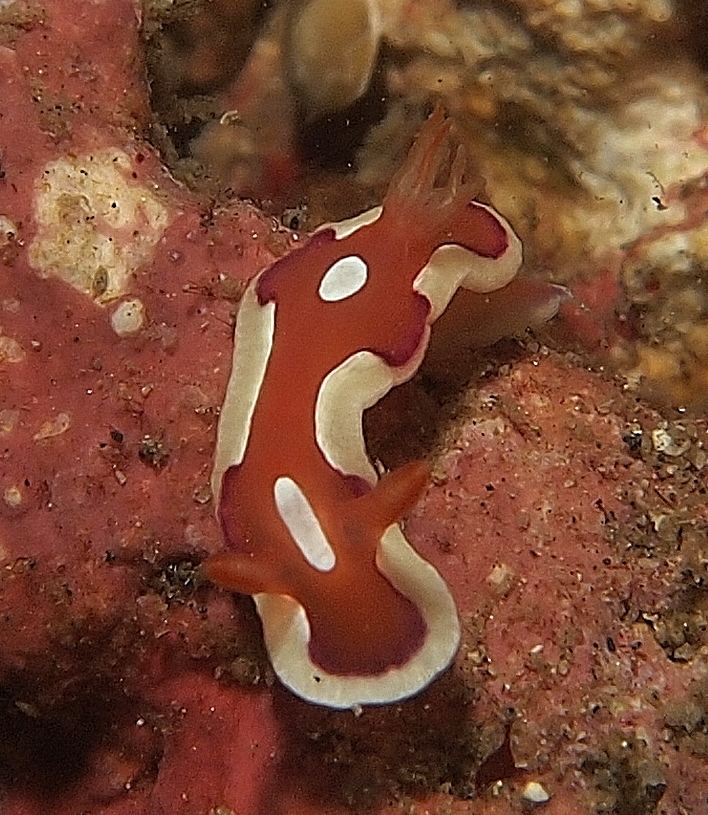

Scientific classification
- Kingdom: Animalia
- Phylum: Mollusca
- Class: Gastropoda
- Order: Nudibranchia
- Family: Chromodorididae
- Genus: Mexichromis
- Species: M. pusilla

Binomial name
- Mexichromis pusilla (Bergh, 1874)

Synonyms
- Chromodoris pusilla Bergh, 1874 (basionym); Durvilledoris pusilla (Bergh, 1874)

= Mexichromis pusilla =

Species of gastropod

Mexichromis pusilla is a species of sea slug or dorid nudibranch, a marine gastropod mollusk in the family Chromodorididae.

== Distribution ==
This nudibranch is found in the tropical Indo-Pacific Ocean.

== Description ==
Mexichromis pusilla has a pink-orange body, gills and rhinophores. The mantle is edged with a broad pale yellow band, and there are two white spots on its dorsum. This species is easily confused with other similarly coloured nudibranchs, especially Verconia varians and Verconia norba.

This species can reach a total length of at least 20 mm, and like all Chromodorids, feeds on sponges.
