= Neptunazurea sisalensis =

Scientific classification
- Kingdom: Animalia
- Phylum: Mollusca
- Class: Gastropoda
- Order: Nudibranchia
- Family: Chromodorididae
- Genus: Neptunazurea
- Species: N. sisalensis

Binomial name
- Neptunazurea sisalensis Ortigosa & Valdés, 2012

Synonyms
- Felimare sisalensis Ortigosa & Á. Valdés, 2012

Species of gastropod

Neptunazurea sisalensis is a species of sea slug or dorid nudibranch, a marine gastropod mollusc in the family Chromodorididae.

== Distribution ==
This species was described from two specimens collected at 7 m (23 ft) depth at Madagascar Reef, Campeche Bank, Yucatan, Mexico, 21°26′28.3″N 90°17′22.8″W.
