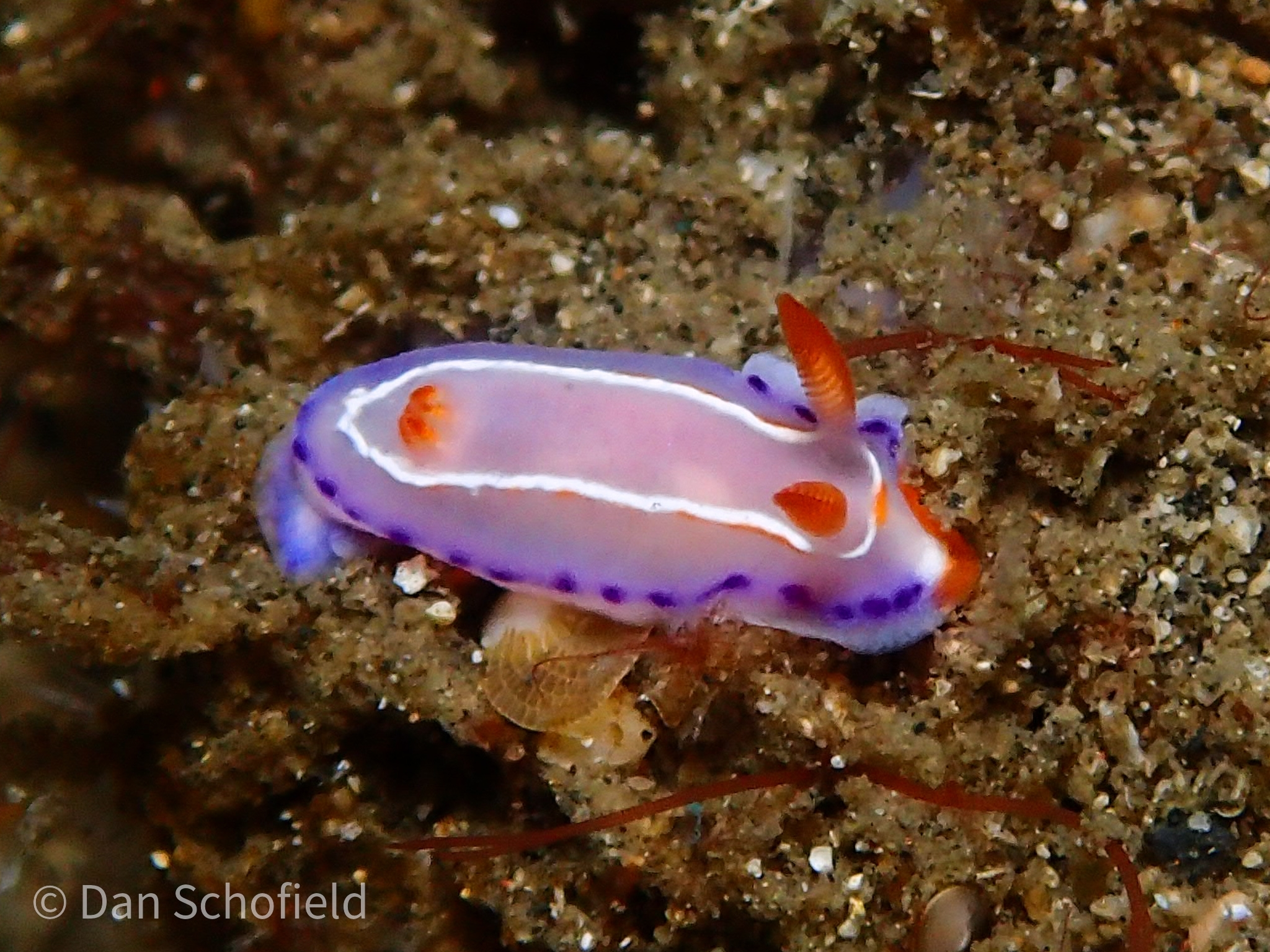

Scientific classification
- Kingdom: Animalia
- Phylum: Mollusca
- Class: Gastropoda
- Order: Nudibranchia
- Family: Chromodorididae
- Genus: Thorunna
- Species: T. florens

Binomial name
- Thorunna florens (Baba, 1949)

Synonyms
- Glossodoris florens Baba, 1949

= Thorunna florens =

Species of gastropod

Thorunna florens is a species of sea slug, a dorid nudibranch, a shell-less marine gastropod mollusk in the family Chromodorididae.

== Distribution ==
This species was described from Japan. It has been reported from Thailand, Australia and Indonesia but is probably a species complex.
