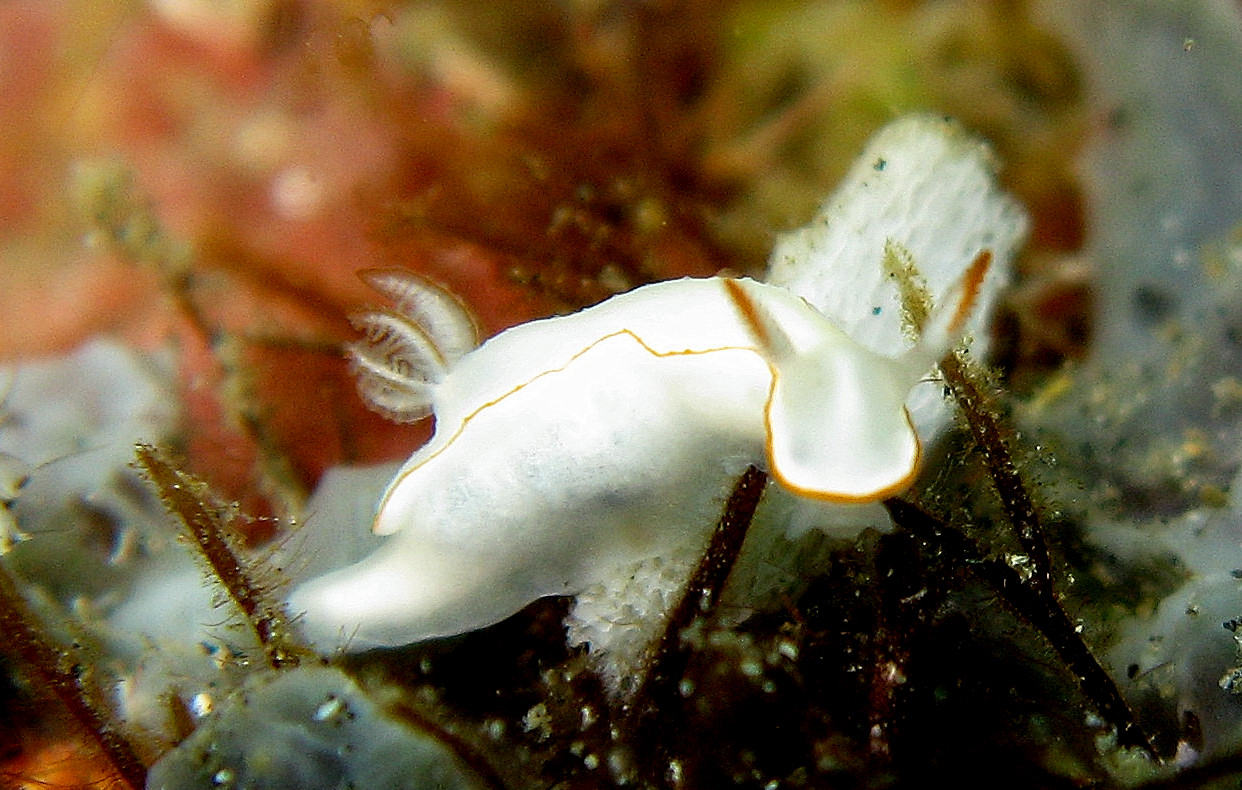
- A live individual of Thorunna furtiva, in situ, head end on the right and turned towards the camera

Scientific classification
- Kingdom: Animalia
- Phylum: Mollusca
- Class: Gastropoda
- Order: Nudibranchia
- Family: Chromodorididae
- Genus: Thorunna
- Species: T. furtiva

Binomial name
- Thorunna furtiva Bergh, 1878

= Thorunna furtiva =

Species of gastropod

Thorunna furtiva is a species of sea slug, a dorid nudibranch, a shell-less marine gastropod mollusk in the family Chromodorididae. It is the type species of the genus Thorunna.

== Distribution ==
This species was described from Camiguin, Luzon, the Philippines. It has been reported throughout the western tropical Indo-Pacific Ocean.

== Description ==
Thorunna furtiva has a white mantle with a thin orange-yellow line at the edge.
