= Mexichromis albofimbria =

Scientific classification
- Kingdom: Animalia
- Phylum: Mollusca
- Class: Gastropoda
- Order: Nudibranchia
- Family: Chromodorididae
- Genus: Mexichromis
- Species: M. albofimbria

Binomial name
- Mexichromis albofimbria (Rudman, 1995)

Synonyms
- Durvilledoris albofimbria Rudman, 1995

Species of gastropod

Mexichromis albofimbria is a species of sea slug or dorid nudibranch, a marine gastropod mollusk in the family Chromodorididae.

== Distribution ==
This nudibranch is known from New Caledonia.

== Description ==
Mexichromis albofimbria has a pale-pink body, a thin white-lined mantle and pale orange gills and rhinophores. It is almost identical to Thorunna punicea and very similar to members of the Hypselodoris bullocki group.

This species can reach a total length of at least 11 mm, and like all Chromodorids, feeds on sponges.
