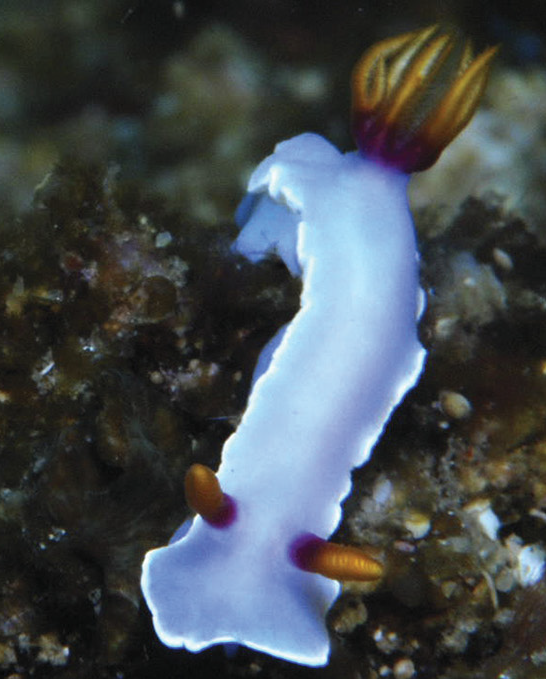

Scientific classification
- Kingdom: Animalia
- Phylum: Mollusca
- Class: Gastropoda
- Order: Nudibranchia
- Family: Chromodorididae
- Genus: Thorunna
- Species: T. punicea

Binomial name
- Thorunna punicea (Rudman, 1995)

Synonyms
- Hypselodoris punicea Rudman, 1995

= Thorunna punicea =

Species of gastropod

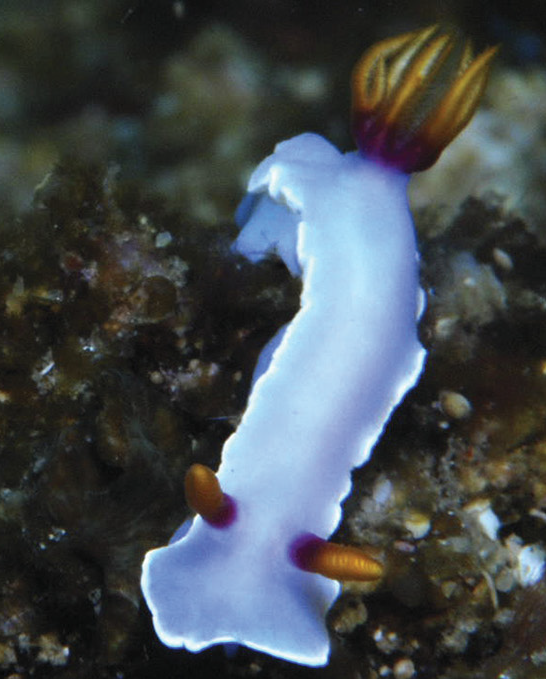
Thorunna punicea

Thorunna punicea is a species of sea slug, a dorid nudibranch, a shell-less marine gastropod mollusk in the family Chromodorididae.

== Distribution ==
This species was described from Passe de Koumac, New Caledonia, 20°40.7′S 164°14.7′E.

== Description ==
This species is similar in coloration to Hypselodoris melanesica and Mexichromis albofimbria. It has a purple mantle with a thin white margin and darker purple bases to the rhinophores and gills.
