= Mexichromis tica =

Scientific classification
- Kingdom: Animalia
- Phylum: Mollusca
- Class: Gastropoda
- Order: Nudibranchia
- Family: Chromodorididae
- Genus: Mexichromis
- Species: M. tica

Binomial name
- Mexichromis tica Gosliner, Ortea & Valdés, 2004

Species of gastropod

Mexichromis tica is a species of sea slug, a dorid nudibranch, a shell-less marine gastropod mollusk in the family Chromodorididae.

== Distribution ==
The holotype of this species was collected at the NE side of Darwin Island (1.681565°N 91.999072°W), Galápagos Islands, Ecuador at 23 m depth with a second specimen. Two specimens from Bajo del Diablo, Isla del Caño, (8.705561°N 83.902846°W) on the adjacent mainland of Costa Rica were also included in the original description.

== Description ==
Mexichromis tica is translucent white with pink viscera showing through the back. There is an opaque white band along the middle of the back and a broad opaque white band at the mantle edge. Adjoining the inner side of the white marginal band is a band of orange or yellow, which may be broken into spots. There is a medial white band on the translucent foot with an elongate orange spot in it. The gill pinnae and rhinophores are translucent white, with orange pigment at the tips of the rhinophores. The living animals were only up to 6 mm (0.24 in) in length.
