= Mexichromis circumflava =

Scientific classification
- Kingdom: Animalia
- Phylum: Mollusca
- Class: Gastropoda
- Order: Nudibranchia
- Family: Chromodorididae
- Genus: Mexichromis
- Species: M. circumflava

Binomial name
- Mexichromis circumflava (Rudman, 1990)

Synonyms
- Durvilledoris circumflava

Species of gastropod

Mexichromis circumflava is a species of sea slug or dorid nudibranch, a marine gastropod mollusk in the family Chromodorididae.

== Distribution ==
This nudibranch is known only from Madang in Papua New Guinea.

== Description ==
Mexichromis circumflava has a white body, an orange-lined mantle and orange gills and rhinophores.

Like all Chromodorids, this species feeds on sponges.
