= Mexichromis lemniscata =

Scientific classification
- Kingdom: Animalia
- Phylum: Mollusca
- Class: Gastropoda
- Order: Nudibranchia
- Family: Chromodorididae
- Genus: Mexichromis
- Species: M. lemniscata

Binomial name
- Mexichromis lemniscata (Quoy & Gaimard, 1832)

Synonyms
- Chromodoris clitonota Bergh, 1905; Chromodoris luxuriosa Bergh, 1874; Chromodoris scurra Bergh, 1874; Chromodoris variegata Pease, 1871; Doris dorsalis Gould, 1852; Doris lemniscata Quoy & Gaimard, 1832 (basionym); Durvilledoris lemniscata (Quoy & Gaimard, 1832); Glossodoris clitonota Bergh, 1905; Glossodoris lemniscata (Quoy & Gaimard, 1832)

Species of gastropod

Mexichromis lemniscata is a species of colourful sea slug or dorid nudibranch, a marine gastropod mollusk in the family Chromodorididae.

== Distribution ==
This nudibranch was described from Port Louis, Mauritius. It is reported from the tropical Indo-Pacific Ocean including the Red Sea, Réunion, Thailand, Australia, Fiji, Moorea and the Phoenix Islands.

== Description ==
Mexichromis lemniscata has a pale pink-red body, with a white and purple-lined mantle. There are three thick lines on its dorsum, coloured yellow-white-yellow respectively. The gills and rhinophores are covered with different coloured rings, from base to tip, white-red-purple-lilac. This species is easily confused with other similarly coloured nudibranchs and shows considerable variation; it is likely to be an unresolved species complex.

Mexichromis lemniscata can reach a total length of at least 35 mm, and like all Chromodorids, feeds on sponges.
