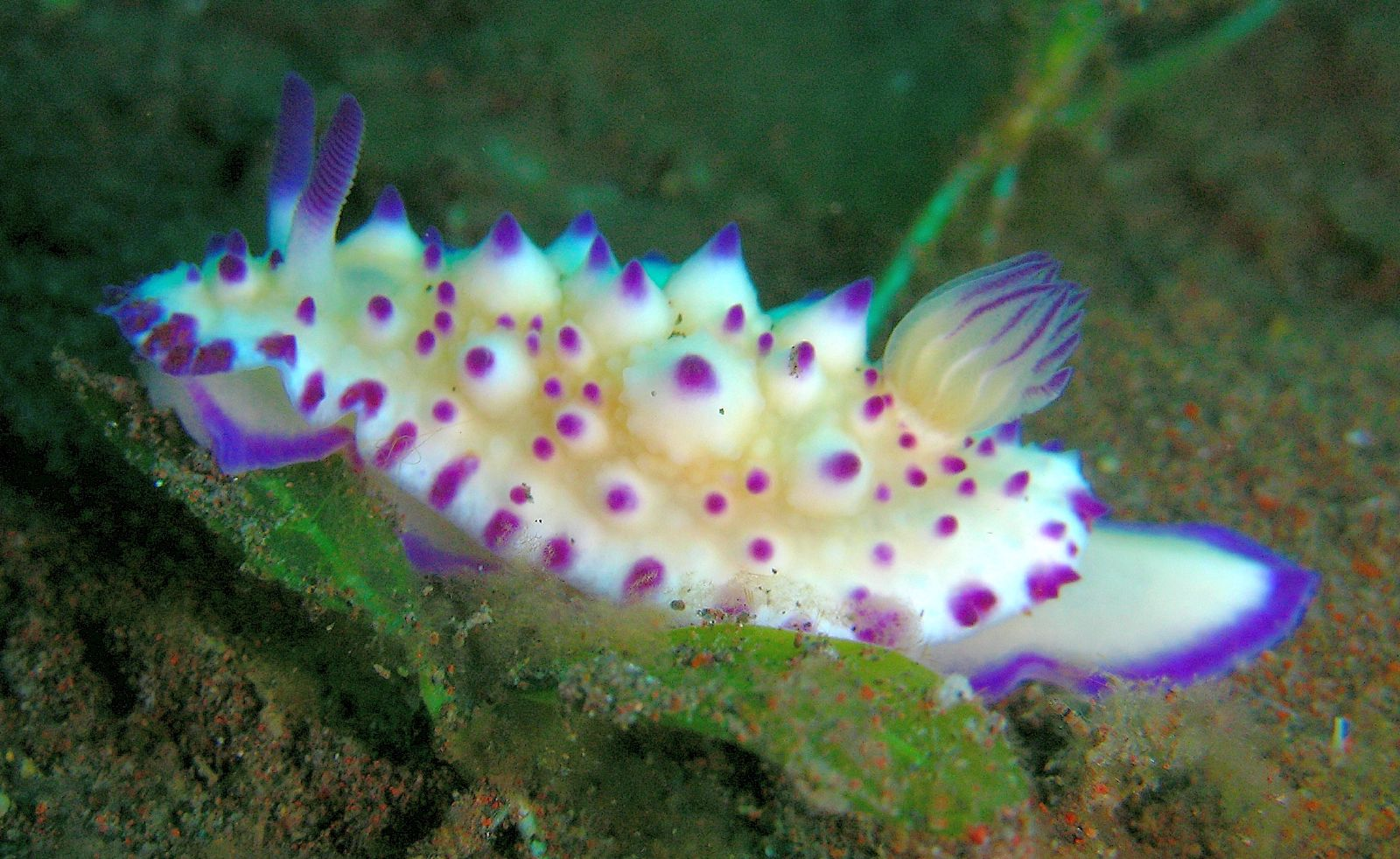

Scientific classification
- Kingdom: Animalia
- Phylum: Mollusca
- Class: Gastropoda
- Order: Nudibranchia
- Family: Chromodorididae
- Genus: Mexichromis
- Species: M. multituberculata

Binomial name
- Mexichromis multituberculata (Baba, 1953)

Synonyms
- Glossodoris multituberculata Baba, 1953

= Mexichromis multituberculata =

Species of gastropod

Mexichromis multituberculata is a species of sea slug, a dorid nudibranch, a shell-less marine gastropod mollusk in the family Chromodorididae.

== Distribution ==
This animal was initially found in the Seto Inland Sea and Kii Channel, Japan, and later near Hainan Island and Hong Kong in China, and has been photographed in Indonesia, Malaysia, Papua New Guinea, Sulawesi, Egypt, Thailand.

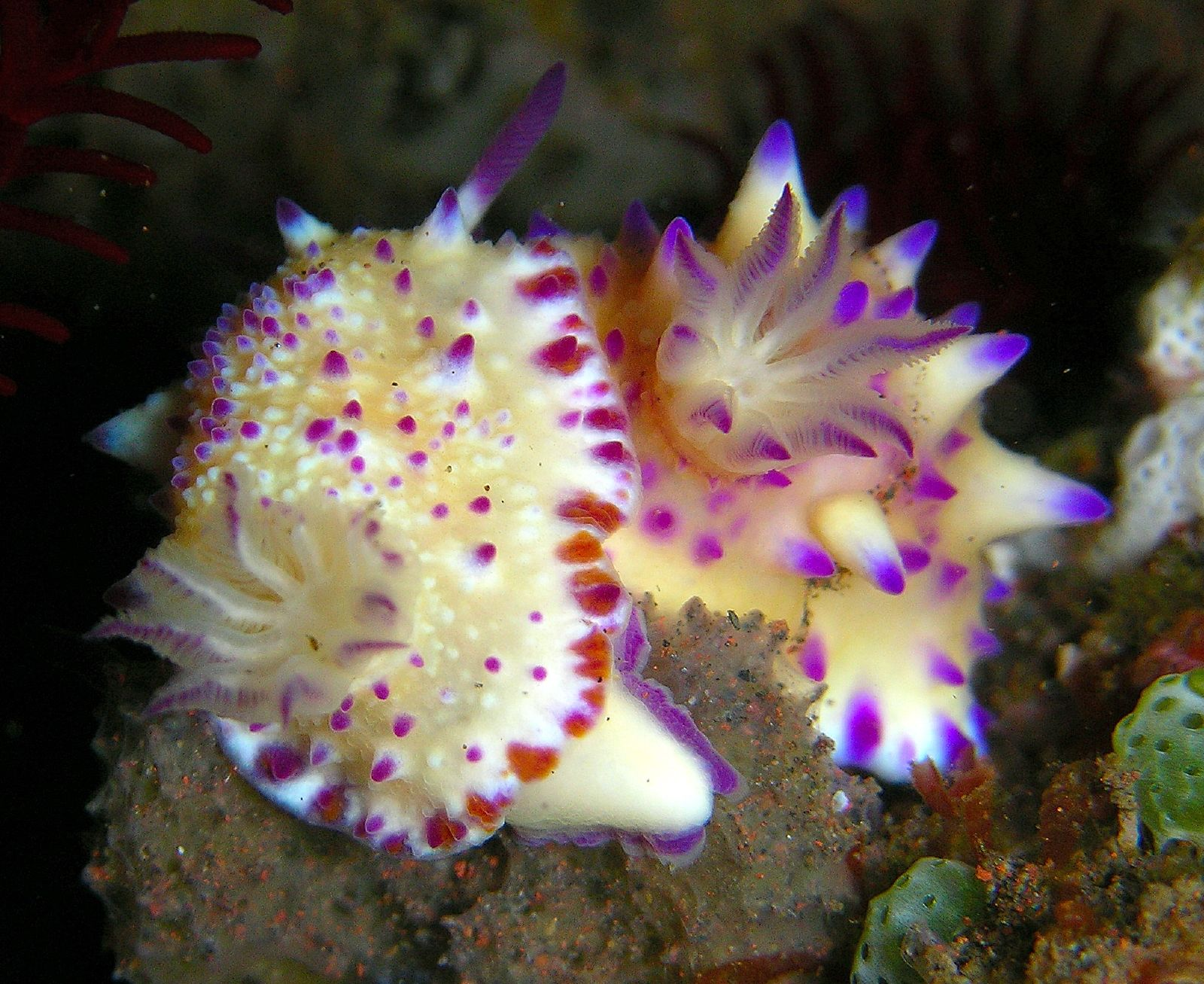
A pair of Mexichromis multituberculata

== Description ==
This species has purple spots around the edge of the mantle. The mantle also has scattered purple-tipped tubercules. It is frequently confused with Mexichromis katalexis which is similar but has orange markings at the edge of the mantle instead of purple markings containing a darker tubercle. The two species may be found together, feeding on the same sponge.
