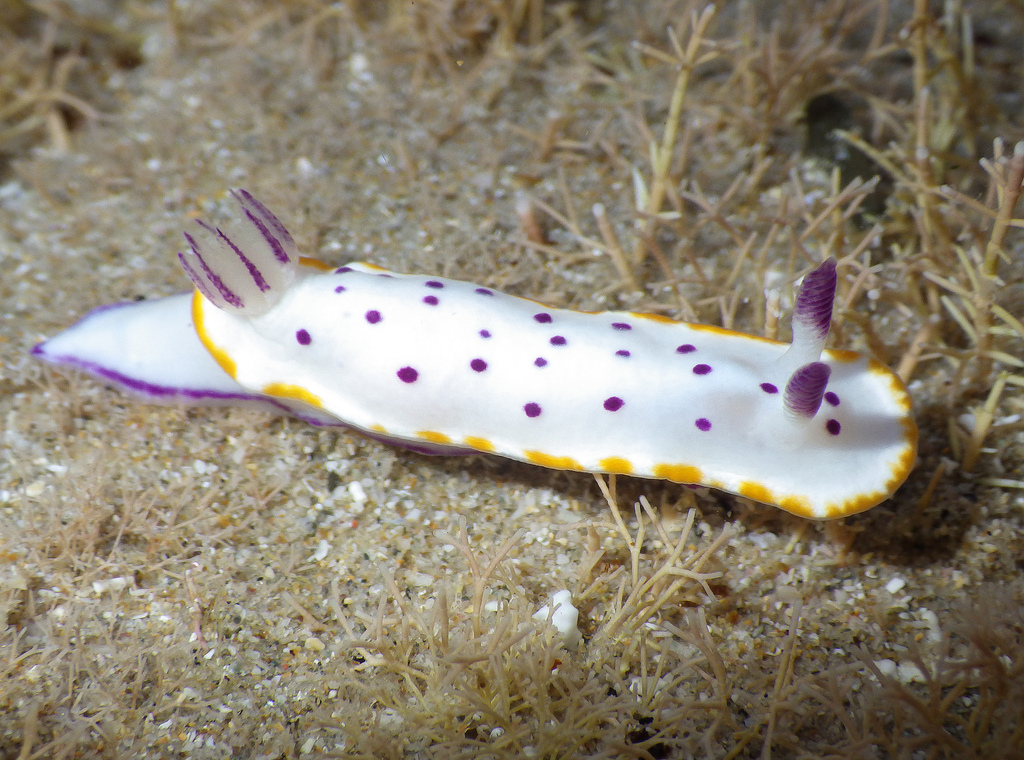

Scientific classification
- Kingdom: Animalia
- Phylum: Mollusca
- Class: Gastropoda
- Order: Nudibranchia
- Family: Chromodorididae
- Genus: Mexichromis
- Species: M. festiva

Binomial name
- Mexichromis festiva (Angas, 1864)

Synonyms
- Goniodoris festiva Angas, 1864; Chromodoris festiva (Angas, 1864); Hypselodoris festiva (Angas, 1864)

= Mexichromis festiva =

Species of gastropod

Mexichromis festiva is a species of sea slug, a dorid nudibranch, a shell-less marine gastropod mollusc in the family Chromodorididae.

== Distribution ==
This species was described from Port Jackson, Australia.

== Description ==
Mexichromis festiva is a white chromodorid nudibranch with raised pink spots on the mantle. The edge of the mantle has a broken yellow line superimposed on an opaque white margin. The gill rachis is pink and the gill leaves are white. The outer half of the rhinophores is pink.
