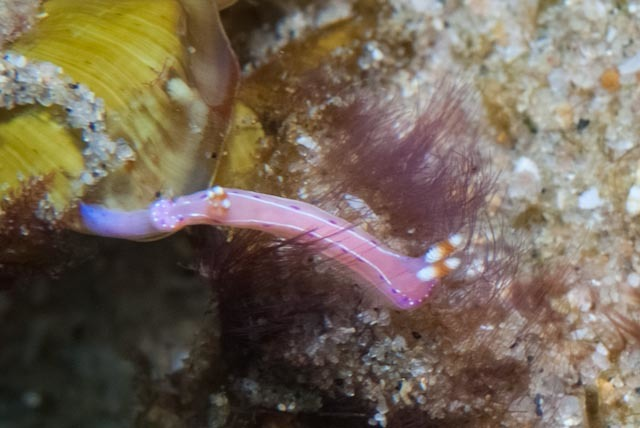

Scientific classification
- Kingdom: Animalia
- Phylum: Mollusca
- Class: Gastropoda
- Order: Nudibranchia
- Family: Chromodorididae
- Genus: Thorunna
- Species: T. australis

Binomial name
- Thorunna australis (Risbec, 1928)

Synonyms
- Chromodoris australis Risbec, 1928 (basionym); Glossodoris australis (Risbec, 1928)

= Thorunna australis =

Species of gastropod

Thorunna australis is a species of sea slug, a dorid nudibranch, a shell-less marine gastropod mollusk in the family Chromodorididae.

== Distribution ==
This species was described from New Caledonia. It has been reported from Japan, the Philippines, Indonesia, the Marshall Islands and South Africa.

== Description ==
This species is similar in shape and coloration to species of the Hypselodoris maculosa species complex, especially Hypselodoris paradisa.
