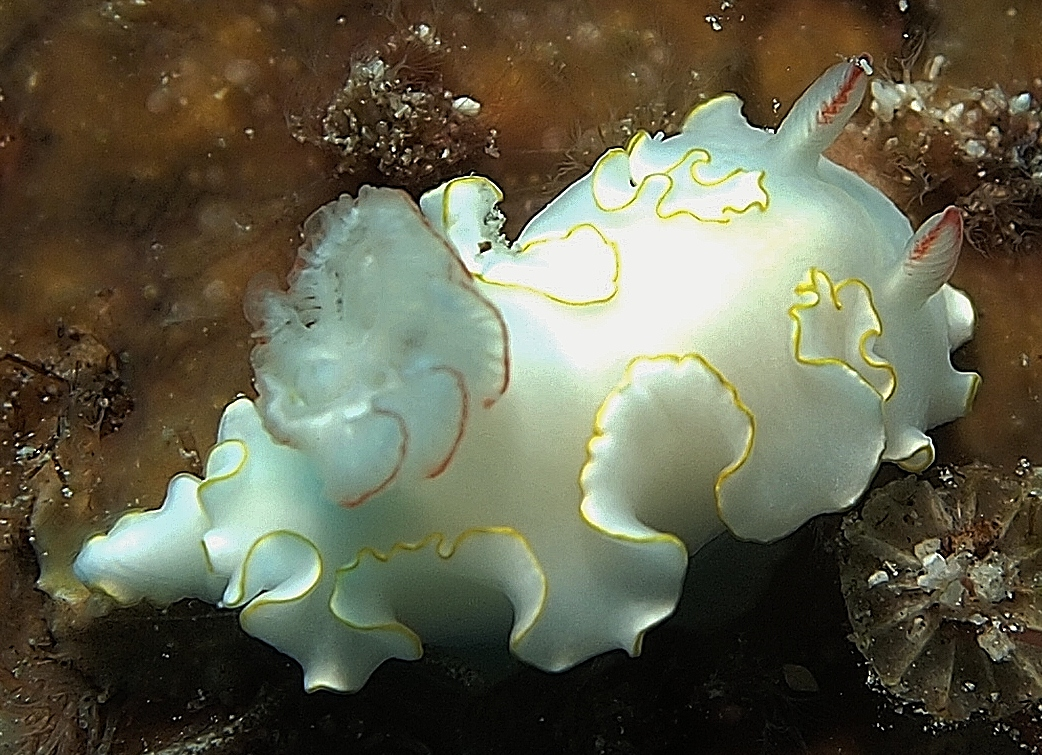

Scientific classification
- Kingdom: Animalia
- Phylum: Mollusca
- Class: Gastropoda
- Order: Nudibranchia
- Family: Chromodorididae
- Genus: Thorunna
- Species: T. africana

Binomial name
- Thorunna africana Rudman, 1984

= Thorunna africana =

Species of gastropod

Thorunna africana is a small species of sea slug, a dorid nudibranch, a shell-less marine gastropod mollusk in the family Chromodorididae.

== Distribution ==
This species was described from the Sudanese Red Sea and Tanzania with the type locality being Dar Es Salaam. It has been reported from Madagascar and the Andaman Islands.

== Description ==
This is a small nudibranch, growing to 25 mm (0.98 in). It is white in colour with a yellow, ruffled, margin to the mantle. The gills and rhinophores are white with bright red lines.

== Ecology ==
Thorunna africana feeds on sponges of the genus Dysidea.
