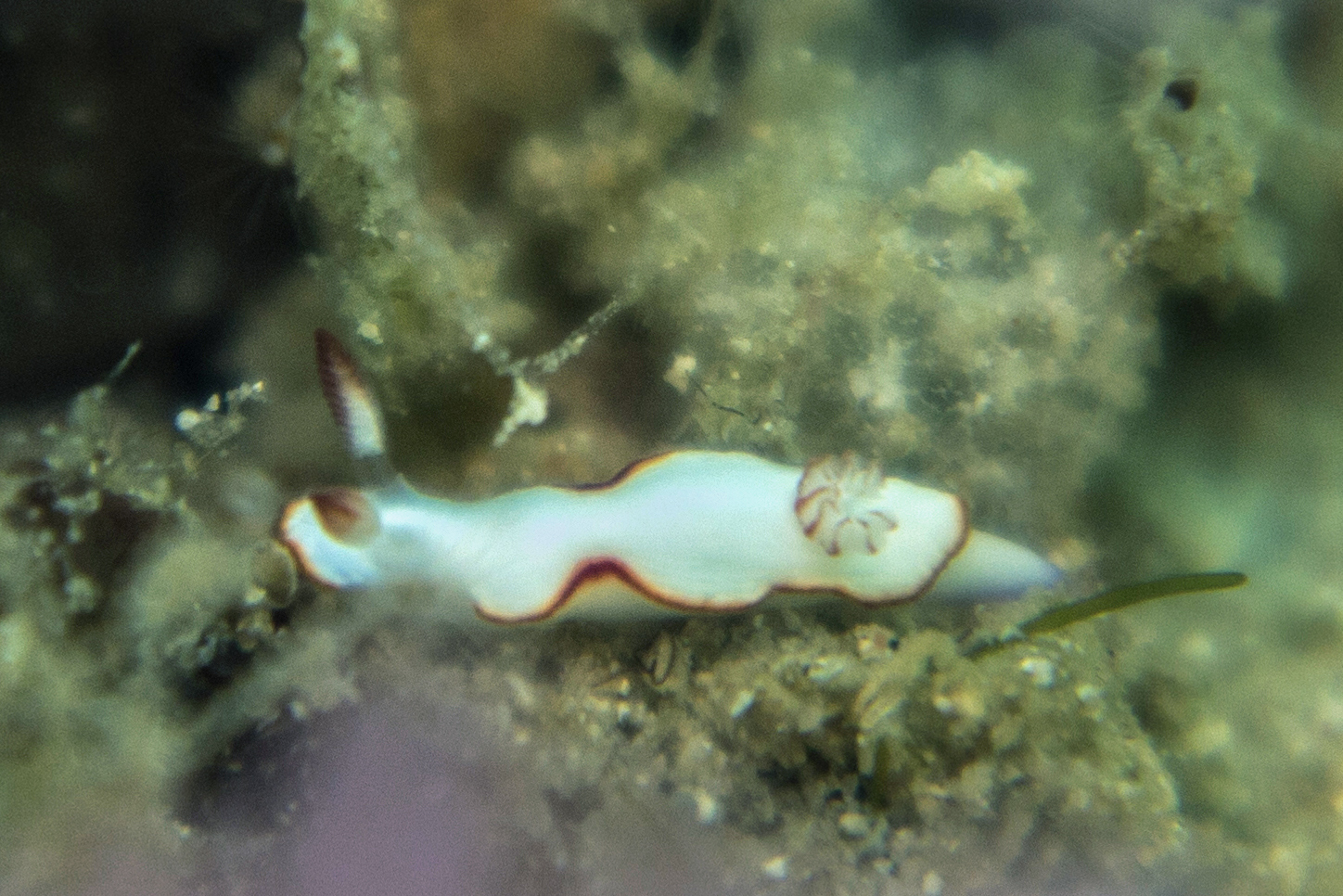
- Thorunna horologia
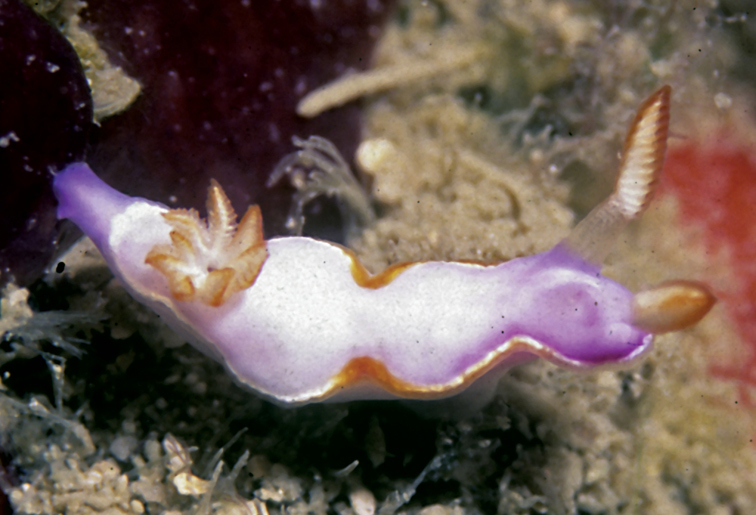
- Thorunna cf. horologia

Scientific classification
- Kingdom: Animalia
- Phylum: Mollusca
- Class: Gastropoda
- Order: Nudibranchia
- Family: Chromodorididae
- Genus: Thorunna
- Species: T. horologia

Binomial name
- Thorunna horologia Rudman, 1984

= Thorunna horologia =

Species of gastropod

Thorunna horologia is a species of sea slug, a dorid nudibranch, a shell-less marine gastropod mollusk in the family Chromodorididae.

== Distribution ==
This species was described from Dar Es Salaam, Tanzania. It has been reported from South Africa and Réunion.
