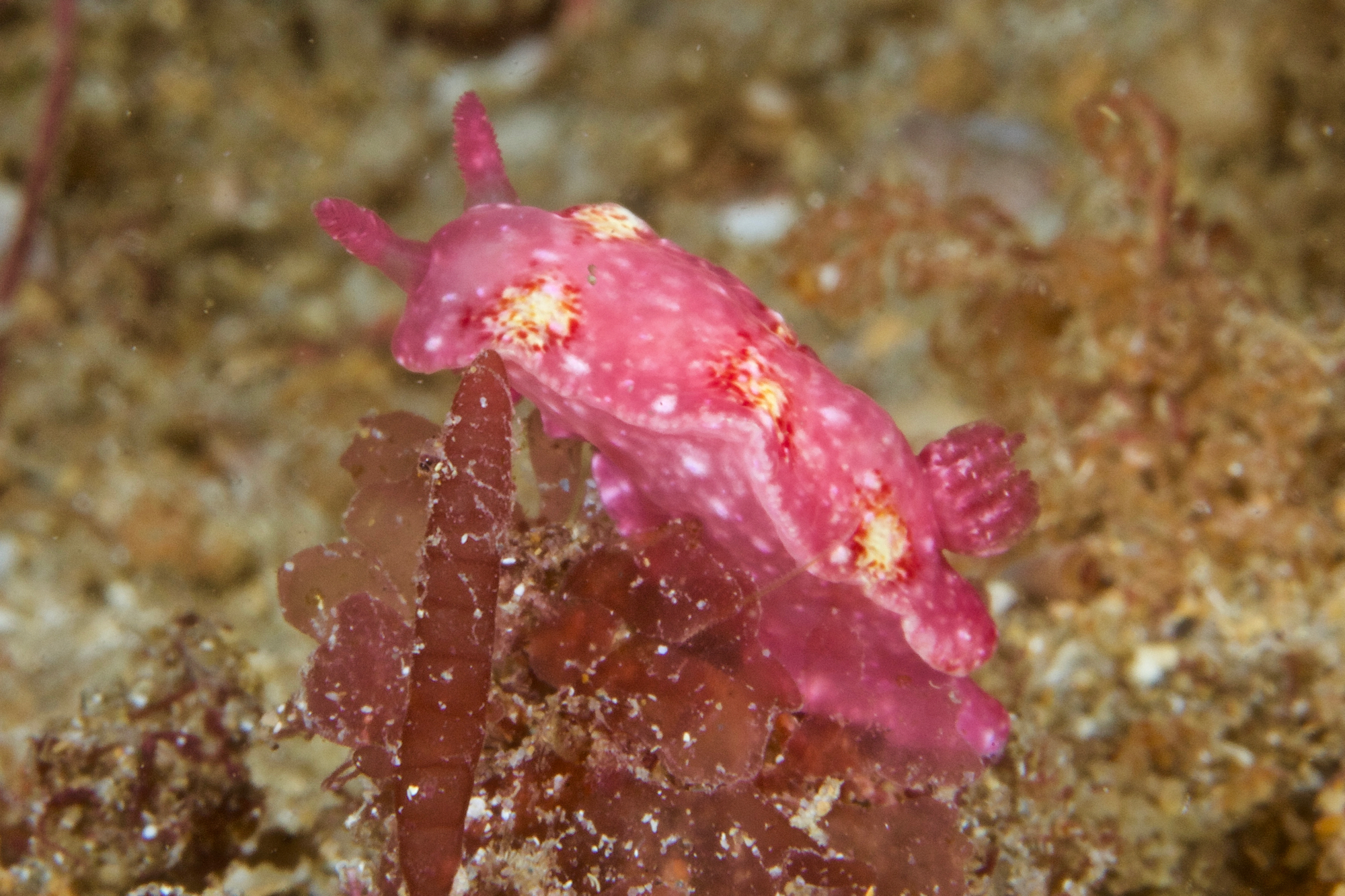
- Thorunna arbuta, Port Phillip Bay, Victoria, Australia

Scientific classification
- Kingdom: Animalia
- Phylum: Mollusca
- Class: Gastropoda
- Order: Nudibranchia
- Family: Chromodorididae
- Genus: Thorunna
- Species: T. arbuta

Binomial name
- Thorunna arbuta (Burn, 1961)

Synonyms
- Babaina arbuta (Burn, 1961); Digidentis arbuta (Burn, 1961); Glossodoris arbuta Burn, 1961 (original combination)

= Thorunna arbuta =

Species of gastropod

Thorunna arbuta is a species of dorid nudibranch in the family Chromodorididae.

== Distribution ==
This species was described from Danger Point, Torquay, Victoria, Australia, 38°20′S 144°19′E.

== Description ==
Thorunna arbuta has a body colour of bright pink with paler mottling, the foot, rhinophores and gills are the same colour. The mantle margin is indented at the sides and at each indent there is a large rounded patch of yellow edged with bright red flecks.
