= Thorunna talaverai =

Scientific classification
- Kingdom: Animalia
- Phylum: Mollusca
- Class: Gastropoda
- Order: Nudibranchia
- Family: Chromodorididae
- Genus: Thorunna
- Species: T. talaverai

Binomial name
- Thorunna talaverai Ortea, Bacallado & Valdés, 1992

Species of gastropod

Thorunna talaverai is a species of dorid nudibranch in the family Chromodorididae.

== Distribution ==
This species was described from the Galapagos Islands.
