= Mexichromis antonii =

Scientific classification
- Kingdom: Animalia
- Phylum: Mollusca
- Class: Gastropoda
- Order: Nudibranchia
- Family: Chromodorididae
- Genus: Mexichromis
- Species: M. antonii

Binomial name
- Mexichromis antonii (Bertsch, 1976)

Synonyms
- Chromodoris antonii Bertsch, 1976

Species of gastropod

Mexichromis antonii is a species of sea slug, a dorid nudibranch, a shell-less marine gastropod mollusk in the family Chromodorididae.

== Distribution ==
The holotype of this species was collected in 9 m (30 ft) of water at Punta Aguja (near Mulege), Baja California, Mexico (26°53′N 111°56′W). Three paratypes were also included in the original description, from Isla San Jose, (24°53′N 110°34′W), Los Islotes, (24°36′N 110°24′W) and Santiago Bay, near Manzanillo, Colima, (19°06′N 104°23′W). It has been reported from the Gulf of California south to Panama.

== Description ==
Mexichromis antonii has a light blue mantle with two bands of colour at the edge, inner black and outer yellow-orange. There is a mid-dorsal line of white which is broken into elongate spots surrounded by a pink-magenta region which stretches from the rhinophore bases to the gill. The light blue area is divided longitudinally by a faint black line. The bases of the rhinophores and gill leaves are pale magenta with the outer half black. Grows to 12 mm (0.47 in) in length.
