= Thorunna montrouzieri =

Scientific classification
- Kingdom: Animalia
- Phylum: Mollusca
- Class: Gastropoda
- Order: Nudibranchia
- Family: Chromodorididae
- Genus: Thorunna
- Species: T. montrouzieri

Binomial name
- Thorunna montrouzieri Rudman, 1995

Species of gastropod

Thorunna montrouzieri is a brightly coloured species of sea slug, a dorid nudibranch, a shell-less marine gastropod mollusk in the family Chromodorididae.

== Distribution ==
This species was described from New Caledonia. It is reported from Queensland, Australia and possibly Okinawa, Japan.
