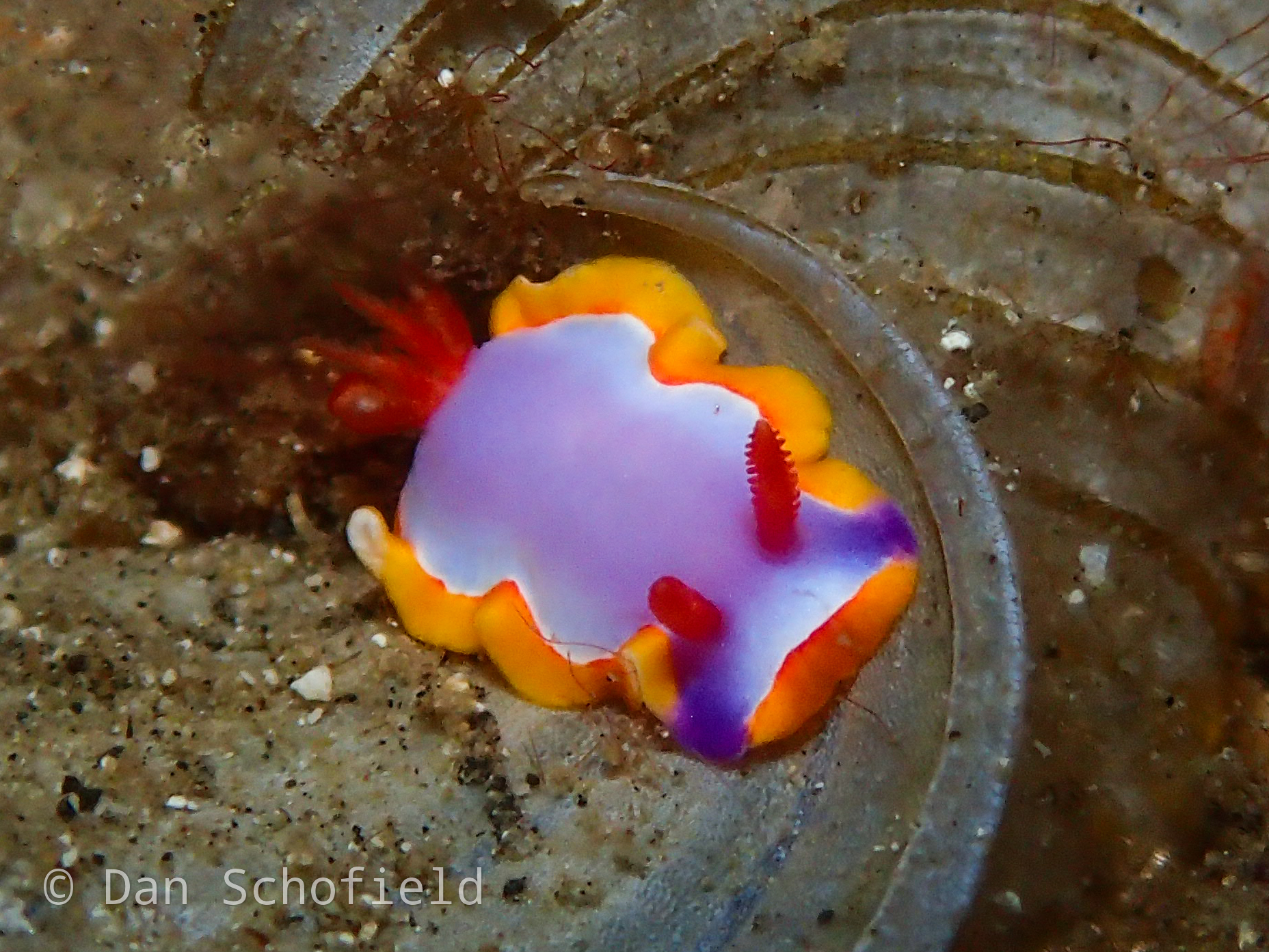

Scientific classification
- Kingdom: Animalia
- Phylum: Mollusca
- Class: Gastropoda
- Order: Nudibranchia
- Family: Chromodorididae
- Genus: Thorunna
- Species: T. purpuropedis

Binomial name
- Thorunna purpuropedis Rudman & S. Johnson, 1985

= Thorunna purpuropedis =

Species of gastropod

Thorunna purpuropedis is a species of sea slug, a dorid nudibranch, a shell-less marine gastropod mollusk in the family Chromodorididae.

== Distribution ==
This species was described from Enewetak Atoll, Marshall Islands. It has been reported from Japan.
