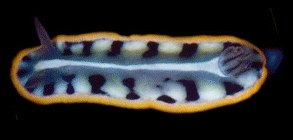
- Oblique left side view of Neptunazurea kempfi.

Conservation status
- Imperiled (NatureServe)

Scientific classification
- Kingdom: Animalia
- Phylum: Mollusca
- Class: Gastropoda
- Order: Nudibranchia
- Family: Chromodorididae
- Genus: Neptunazurea
- Species: N. kempfi

Binomial name
- Neptunazurea kempfi (Ev. Marcus, 1971)

Synonyms
- Chromodoris kempfi Ev. Marcus, 1971 (Basionym); Felimare kempfi Ev. Marcus, 1971; Mexichromis kempfi Ev. Marcus, 1971

= Neptunazurea kempfi =

Species of gastropod

Neptunazurea kempfi is a species of sea slug, a dorid nudibranch, a shell-less marine gastropod mollusk in the family Chromodorididae.

== Taxonomy ==
This species has previously been placed in the genera Chromodoris (Alder & Hancock, 1855) and Mexichromis (Bertsch, 1977)., then transferred to Felimare (Ev. Marcus & Er. Marcus, 1967) by Johnson & Gosliner in 2012.

The most recent development belongs to Ribeiro et al. (2025), in which molecular and morphological analysis of specimens within Felimare led to the establishment therein of genus Neptunazurea (Ribeiro, García-Méndez, Valdés, Schrödl & Padula, 2025). Neptunazurea kempfi specifically received a full taxonomic review within the study.

== Distribution ==
Distribution of Neptunazurea kempfi includes Florida, Mexico, Costa Rica, Venezuela, Brazil, Puerto Rico and Panama.

== Description ==
The body is elongate, narrow, with the posterior portion of foot extending slightly beyond the mantle margin. Background color is bright blue with a thick yellow line around the mantle margin. There is a central white line and a series of large black and white spots extend down the dorsum. Rhinophores and gills are blue, branchial leaves are with black rachises. It is up to 20 mm long.

== Ecology ==
Minimum recorded depth is 6 m. Maximum recorded depth is 37 m.
