= Mexichromis tura =

Scientific classification
- Kingdom: Animalia
- Phylum: Mollusca
- Class: Gastropoda
- Order: Nudibranchia
- Family: Chromodorididae
- Genus: Mexichromis
- Species: M. tura

Binomial name
- Mexichromis tura (Er. Marcus & Ev. Marcus, 1967)

Synonyms
- Chromodoris tura Marcus & Marcus, 1967 (original combination); Glossodoris tura (Marcus & Marcus, 1967); Thorunna tura (Marcus & Marcus, 1967)

Species of gastropod

Mexichromis tura is a species of sea slug, a dorid nudibranch, a shell-less marine gastropod mollusk in the family Chromodorididae.

== Distribution ==
This species is recorded from the Gulf of California to Panama and the Pacific Ocean coast of Mexico. It is considered to be rare.

== Description ==
The central part of the mantle in Mexichromis tura is dark blue with irregular yellow spots and is surrounded by a series of concentric bands. Within the edge of the dark blue area there is a row of white spots which may merge into a line, then a broad pale blue area, a narrower black band and at the edge of the mantle a bright yellow line. The rhinophores are black and the gill leaves are white with the outer third black. This is a small animal, growing to 10 mm (0.39 in) in length.
