= Felimare amalguae =

Scientific classification
- Kingdom: Animalia
- Phylum: Mollusca
- Class: Gastropoda
- Order: Nudibranchia
- Family: Chromodorididae
- Genus: Felimare
- Species: F. amalguae

Binomial name
- Felimare amalguae (Gosliner & Bertsch, 1988)

Synonyms
- Mexichromis amalguae Gosliner & Bertsch, 1988 (basionym)

Species of gastropod

Felimare amalguae is a species of sea slug, a dorid nudibranch, a shell-less marine gastropod mollusk in the family Chromodorididae.

== Distribution ==
This species was described from Isla Cedros, Mexico, in the eastern Pacific Ocean, 28°10′N 115°15′W and nearby San Benito.
