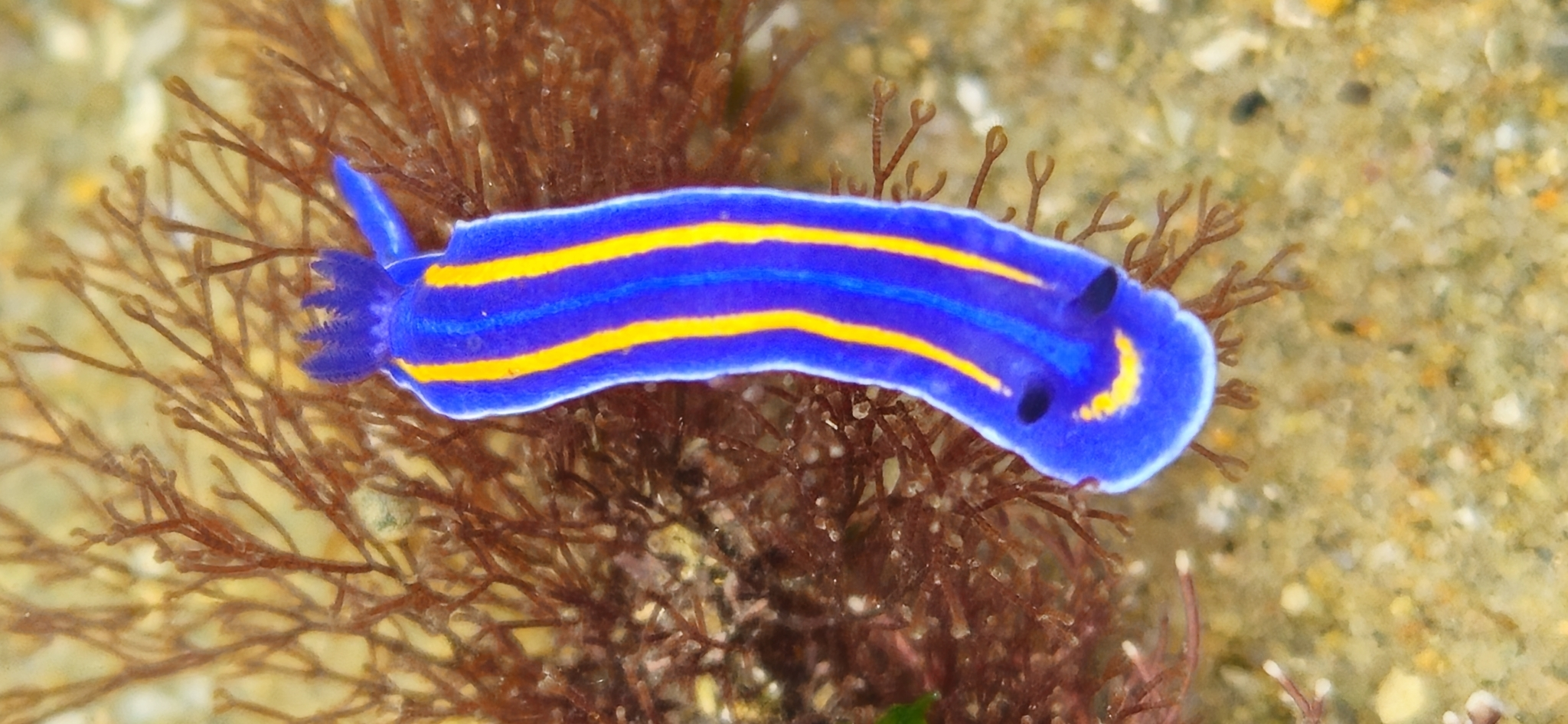

Scientific classification
- Kingdom: Animalia
- Phylum: Mollusca
- Class: Gastropoda
- Order: Nudibranchia
- Family: Chromodorididae
- Genus: Neptunazurea
- Species: N. porterae

Binomial name
- Neptunazurea porterae (Cockerell, 1901)

Synonyms
- Chromodoris porterae Cockerell, 1901 (Basionym); Felimare porterae Cockerell, 1901; Glossodoris porterae Cockerell, 1901; Hypselodoris porterae Cockerell, 1901; Mexichromis porterae Cockerell, 1901

= Neptunazurea porterae =

Species of gastropod

Neptunazurea porterae is a species of sea slug, a dorid nudibranch, a shell-less marine gastropod mollusk in the family Chromodorididae. It was named by Theodore Dru Alison Cockerell in honor of his wife Wilmatte Porter Cockerell.

== Distribution ==
This species was described from rockpools at La Jolla, California. It is reported from Monterey Bay, California to Bahía Tortugas, Baja California, Mexico.

== Description ==
Neptunazurea porterae has a dark blue mantle with a white margin and bright yellow bands which run down the sides of the mantle from the bases of the rhinophores to the gill pocket. There is a light blue line along the middle of the back.
