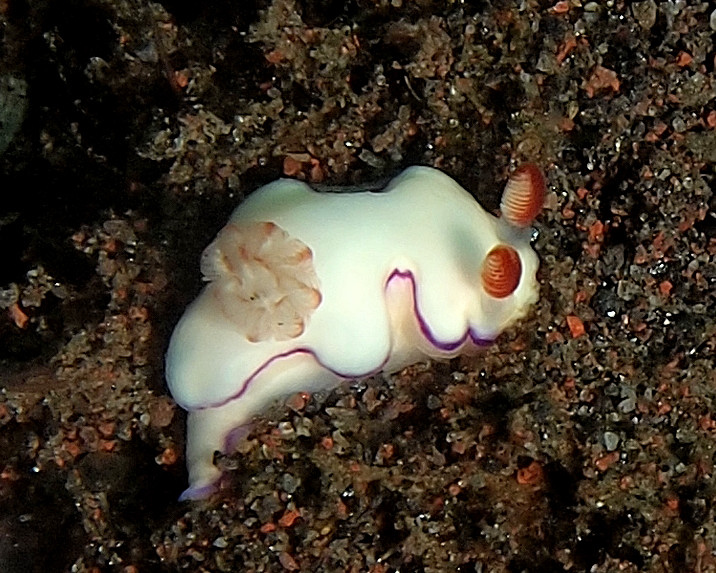
- Thorunna daniellae

Scientific classification
- Kingdom: Animalia
- Phylum: Mollusca
- Class: Gastropoda
- Order: Nudibranchia
- Family: Chromodorididae
- Genus: Thorunna
- Species: T. daniellae

Binomial name
- Thorunna daniellae (Kay & Young, 1969)

= Thorunna daniellae =

Species of gastropod

Thorunna daniellae is a species of sea slug, a dorid nudibranch, a shell-less marine gastropod mollusc in the family Chromodorididae.

== Distribution ==
Hawaiian islands, Midway, and Kure; widely distributed in the Indo-Pacific.

== Description ==
The size of the body varies between 13 mm and 20 mm. This species is opaque white with a magenta line encircling the notum just inside the mantle margin. The rhinophore stalks are translucent, with the clubs orange-red on the anterior side and opaque white on the posterior side. The gills are opaque white with orange-red tips. In very young animals, the notum is translucent and has a herringbone pattern of embedded white spicules beginning between the rhinophores and ending at the gills.
