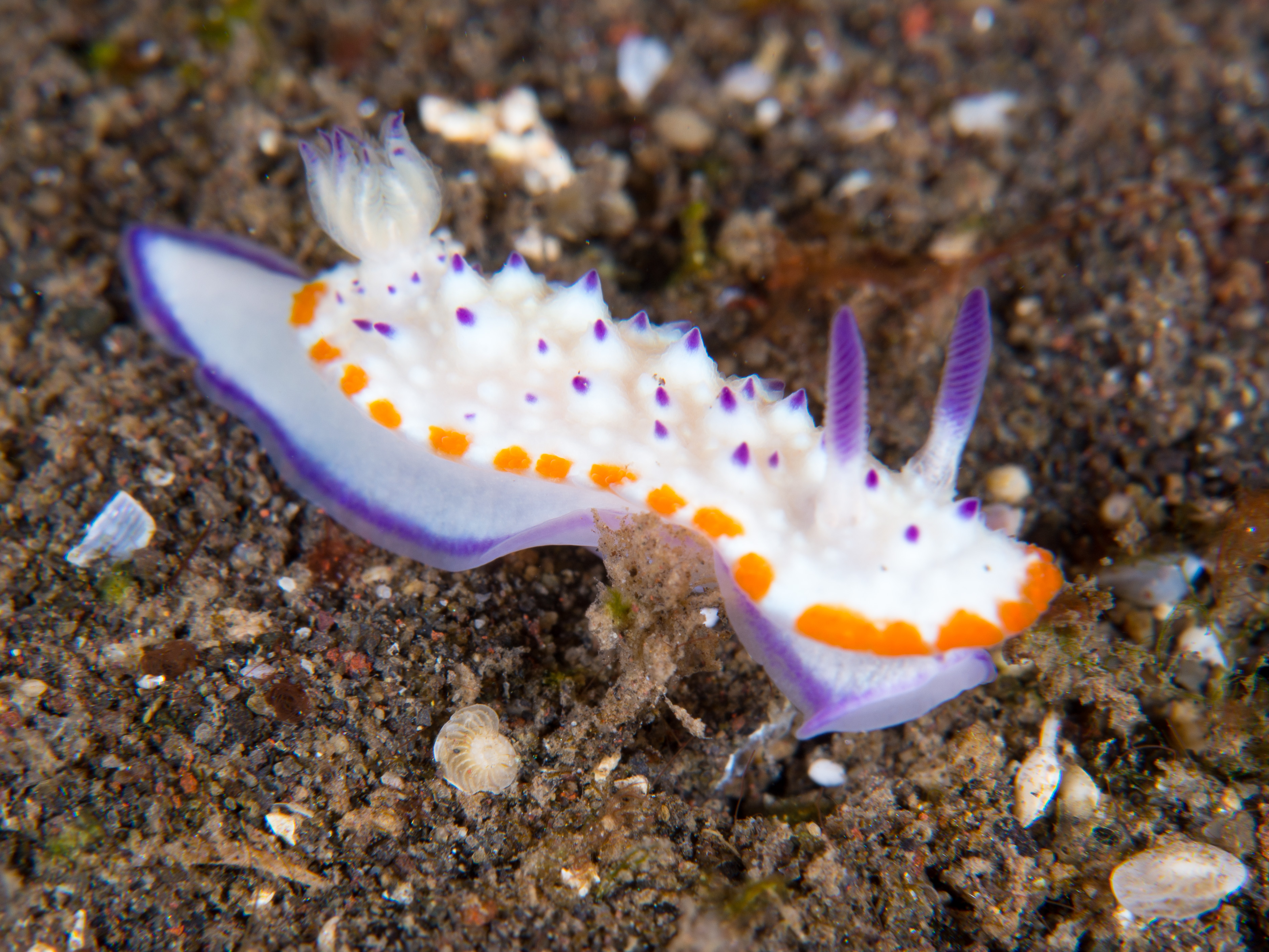
- Tulamben, Bali, Indonesia

Scientific classification
- Kingdom: Animalia
- Phylum: Mollusca
- Class: Gastropoda
- Order: Nudibranchia
- Family: Chromodorididae
- Genus: Mexichromis
- Species: M. katalexis

Binomial name
- Mexichromis katalexis Yonow, 2001

= Mexichromis katalexis =

Species of gastropod

Mexichromis katalexis is a species of sea slug, a dorid nudibranch, a shell-less marine gastropod mollusk in the family Chromodorididae.

== Distribution ==
The holotype of this species was collected in 1990 at 20 m (66 ft) depth, west of Lilibooi, Hitu, Ambon Island. Other specimens from Hitu and Tulamben, Bali were included in the original description.

== Description ==
Mexichromis katalexis is similar to Mexichromis multituberculata (Baba, 1989), which also has conical, pointed, purple-tipped papillae on the dorsum, but the mantle edged with purple patches. It is known from Japan, China, and Hong Kong and clearly differs in the shape of the papillae and the purple tuberculate margin. The two species have been seen together, feeding on the same food and were thought to be conspecific, but there are radula differences as well as colour differences.
