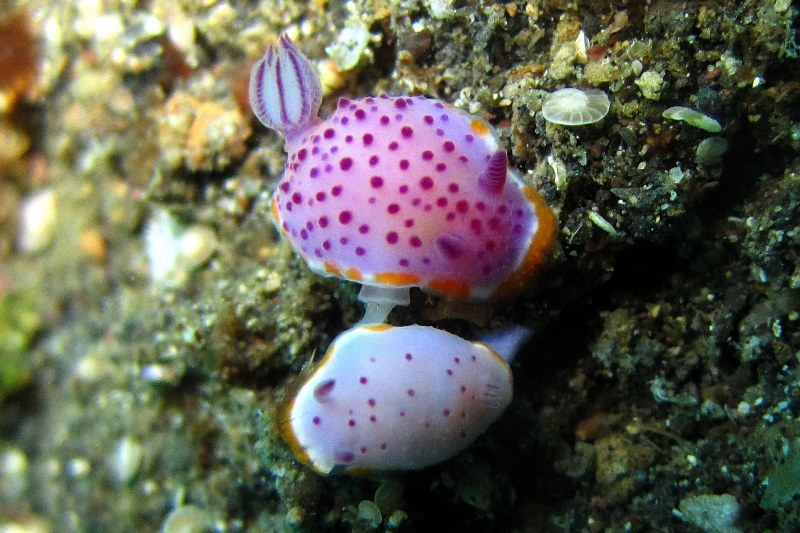
- A pair of Mexichromis mariei mating

Scientific classification
- Kingdom: Animalia
- Phylum: Mollusca
- Class: Gastropoda
- Order: Nudibranchia
- Family: Chromodorididae
- Genus: Mexichromis
- Species: M. mariei

Binomial name
- Mexichromis mariei (Crosse, 1872)

Synonyms
- Chromodoris mariei (Crosse, 1872); Chromodoris sannio Bergh, 1890; Doridopsis mariei (Crosse, 1872); Glossodoris mariei (Crosse, 1872); Goniodoris mariei Crosse, 1872 (original combination)

= Mexichromis mariei =

Species of gastropod

Mexichromis mariei is a species of colourful sea slug, a dorid nudibranch, a shell-less marine gastropod mollusk in the family Chromodorididae.

== Distribution ==
Originally described from New Caledonia this species is widespread in the central Indo-Pacific Ocean. Animals from Japan may represent related species.

== Description ==
Mexichromis mariei has a white to pale pink mantle with scattered rounded pink-purple tubercles. The original description describes red spots around the edge of the mantle but there is usually a yellow band which may be slightly broken into patches. The gills are pale pink with a purple line on the exterior rachis. The rhinophores grade from pale pink to purple at the tips.
