= Neptunazurea molloi =

Scientific classification
- Kingdom: Animalia
- Phylum: Mollusca
- Class: Gastropoda
- Order: Nudibranchia
- Family: Chromodorididae
- Genus: Neptunazurea
- Species: N. molloi

Binomial name
- Neptunazurea molloi (Ortea & Valdés, 1996)

Synonyms
- Felimare molloi Ortea & Á. Valdés, 1996; Mexichromis molloi Ortea & Valdés, 1996 (basionym)

Species of gastropod

Neptunazurea molloi is a species of sea slug, a dorid nudibranch, a shell-less marine gastropod mollusk in the family Chromodorididae.

== Distribution ==
This species was described from Isla Picuda, Chimanas, Mochima in the Caribbean Sea off Venezuela.
