= Neptunazurea francoisae =

Scientific classification
- Kingdom: Animalia
- Phylum: Mollusca
- Class: Gastropoda
- Order: Nudibranchia
- Family: Chromodorididae
- Genus: Neptunazurea
- Species: N. francoisae

Binomial name
- Neptunazurea francoisae (Bouchet, 1980)

Synonyms
- Chromodoris francoisae Bouchet, 1981 (basionym); Felimare Francoisae Bouchet, 1901; Mexichromis francoisae Bouchet, 1981

Species of gastropod

Neptunazurea francoisae is a species of sea slug, a dorid nudibranch, a shell-less marine gastropod mollusk in the family Chromodorididae.

== Distribution ==
This species occurs in the Atlantic Ocean off Cape Verde and Senegal.
