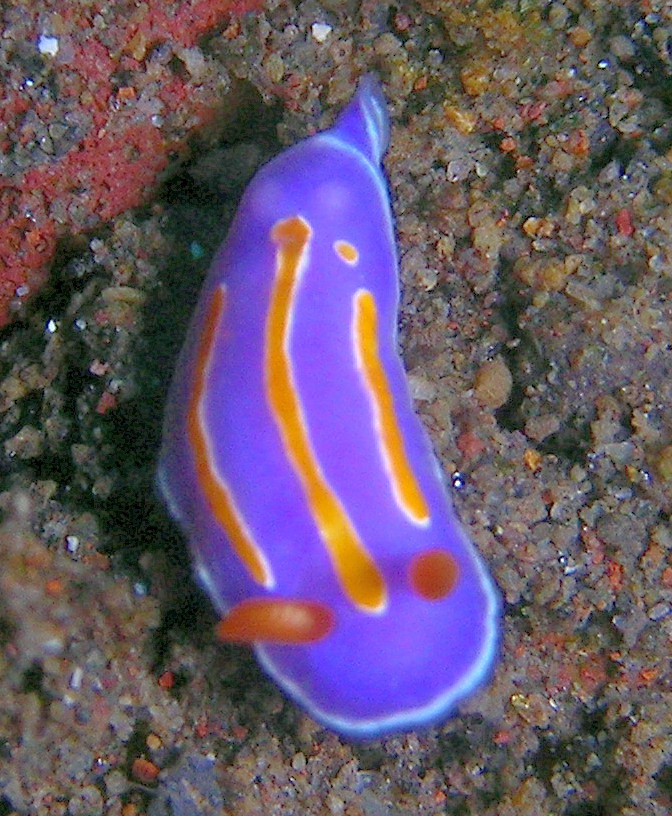
- Mexichromis trilineata

Scientific classification
- Kingdom: Animalia
- Phylum: Mollusca
- Class: Gastropoda
- Order: Nudibranchia
- Family: Chromodorididae
- Genus: Mexichromis
- Species: M. trilineata

Binomial name
- Mexichromis trilineata (Adams & Reeve, 1850)

Synonyms
- Goniodoris trilineata A. Adams & Reeve, 1850 basionym; Chromodoris virgata Bergh, 1905; Pectenodoris trilineata (A. Adams & Reeve, 1850)

= Mexichromis trilineata =

Species of gastropod

Mexichromis trilineata is a colourful species of sea slug, specifically a dorid nudibranch. This marine gastropod mollusc is in the family Chromodorididae. In 2012 the genus Pectenodoris was included into Mexichromis.

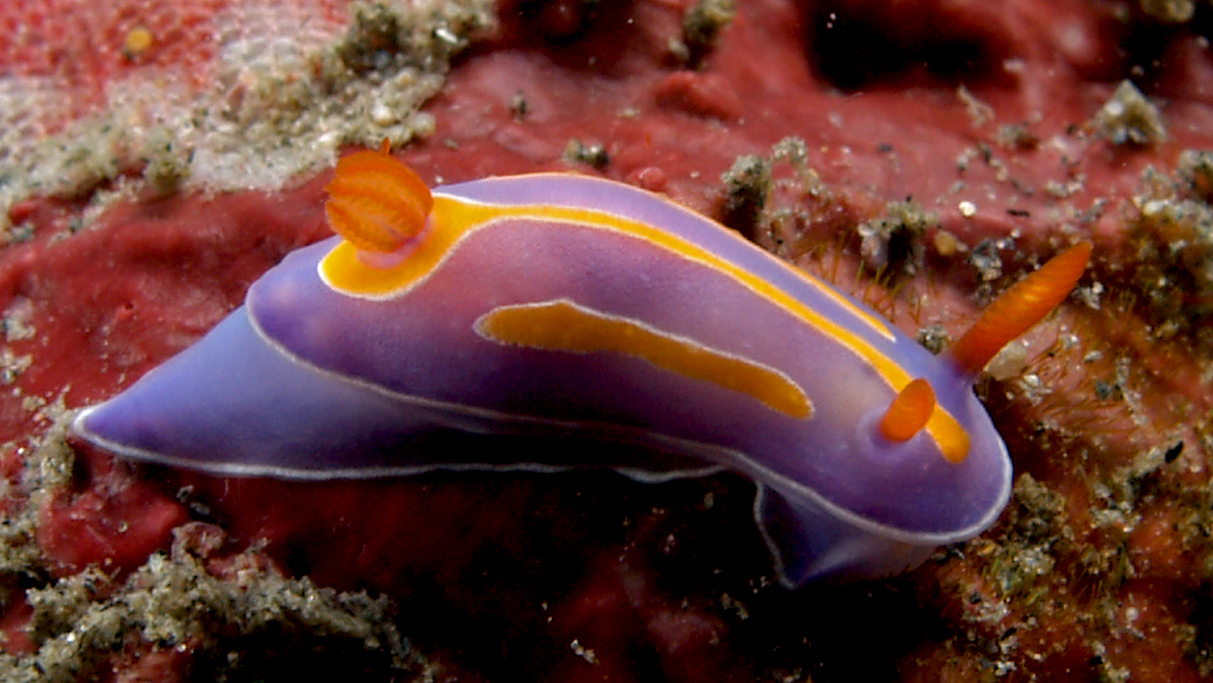
Mexichromis trilineata

== Distribution ==
Mexichromis trilineata has been found in Sumbawa, Sulawesi and Bali, Indonesia; the Philippines, the South China Sea, Heron Island, Great Barrier Reef and Queensland, Australia.

== Description ==
Mexichromis trilineata usually ranges from 7 mm to 15 mm in length, with an elongate to broadly oval body shape. The tail extends slightly beyond the posterior margin. Mexichromis trilineata have three yellow longitudinal bands outlined in white, with the entire mantle edged with a fine white line. They have a few patches of yellow edged with white around the mantle edge, and the defensive mantle glands, arranged around the edge in roughly two series, are visible as pale pink patches. The gills and rhinophores are typically violet at their bases and then translucent white with red markings.

Although individuals of Mexichromis trilineata usually have three longitudinal lines as its name suggests, sometimes these lines are broken into a series of shorter lines, while occasionally the outer two lines are absent. Some specimens have yellow or orange markings on the white lines.
