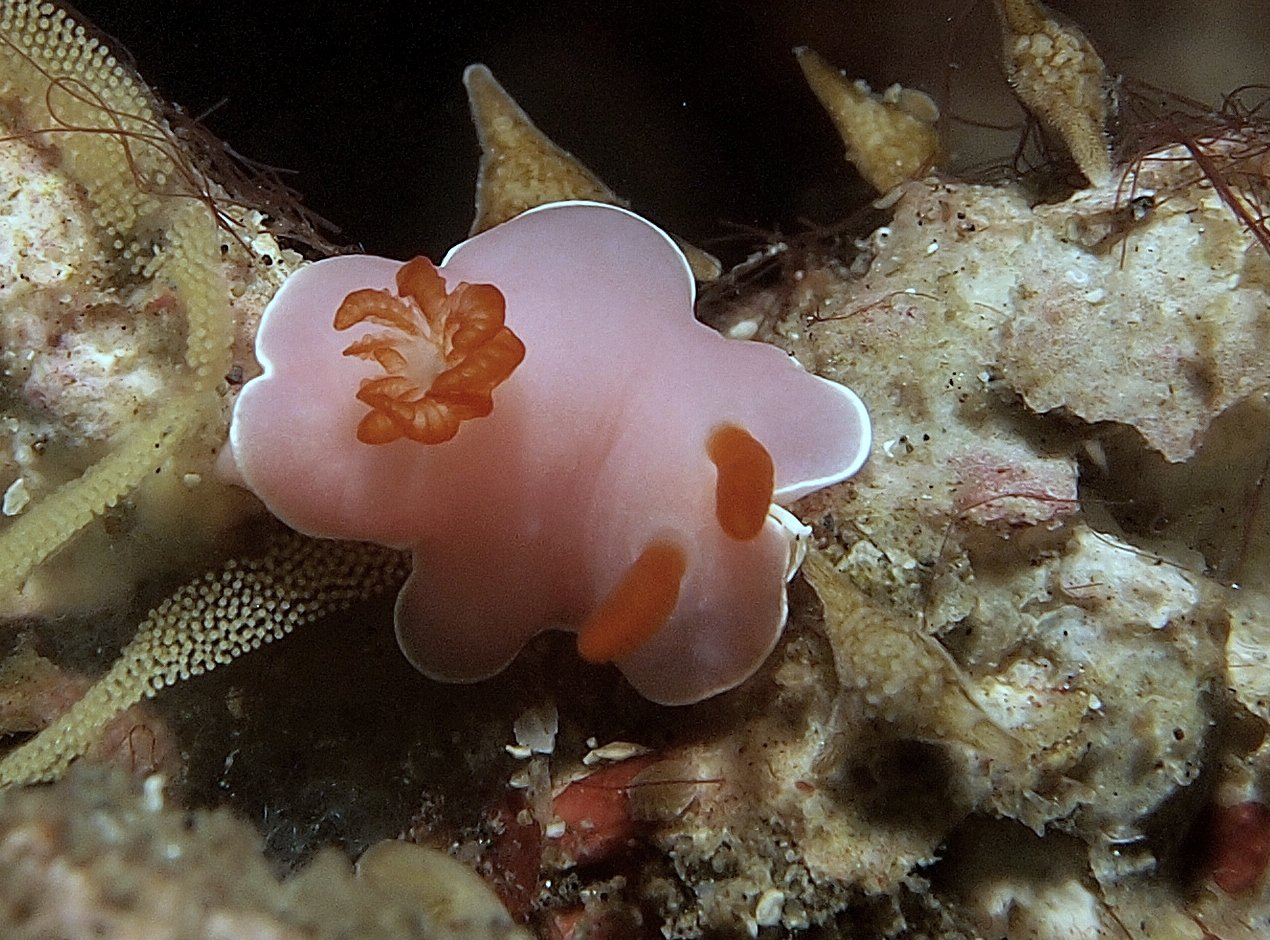
- Verconia romeri

Scientific classification
- Kingdom: Animalia
- Phylum: Mollusca
- Class: Gastropoda
- Order: Nudibranchia
- Family: Chromodorididae
- Genus: Verconia; Pruvot-Fol, 1931

Type species
- Verconia verconis Basedow & Hedley, 1905

Synonyms
- Noumea Risbec, 1928

= Verconia =

Genus of gastropods

Verconia is a genus of sea slugs, dorid nudibranchs, shell-less marine gastropod mollusks in the family Chromodorididae.

The host sponges for species in this genus are sponges in the genera Darwinella and Dendrilla.

Noumea Risbec, 1928 (Mollusca: Gastropoda) is a junior homonym of Noumea Fauvel, 1874 (Arthropoda: Coleoptera), a name in current use. Verconia Pruvot-Fol, 1931 was recognized as a synonym of Noumea Risbec by Johnson & Gosliner (2012) and is here used for species of the chromodoridid group previously known as Noumea.

== Species ==
Species in the genus Verconia include:

- Verconia alboannulata Rudman, 1986
- Verconia aureopunctata Rudman, 1987
- Verconia catalai Rudman, 1990
- Verconia closeorum Rudman, 1986
- Verconia decussata Risbec, 1928
- Verconia haliclona Burn, 1957
- Verconia hongkongiensis Rudman, 1990
- Verconia laboutei Rudman, 1986
- Verconia nivalis Baba, 1937
- Verconia norba Marcus & Marcus, 1970
- Verconia parva (Baba, 1949)
- Verconia protea Gosliner, 1994
- Verconia purpurea Baba, 1949
- Verconia romeri Risbec, 1928 - type species
- Verconia simplex Pease, 1871
- Verconia spencerensis Rudman, 1987
- Verconia subnivalis Baba, 1987
- Verconia sudanica Rudman, 1985
- Verconia varians Pease, 1871
- Verconia verconiforma Rudman, 1995
- Verconia verconis Basedow & Hedley, 1905

Species brought into synonymy:

- Noumea angustolutea Rudman, 1990: synonym of Ardeadoris angustolutea (Rudman, 1990)
- Noumea cameroni Burn, 1966: synonym of Verconia haliclona (Burn, 1957)
- Noumea closei Rudman, 1986: synonym of Verconia closeorum Rudman, 1986
- Noumea crocea Rudman, 1986: synonym of Diversidoris crocea (Rudman, 1986)
- Noumea flava (Eliot, 1904): synonym of Diversidoris flava (Eliot, 1904)
- Noumea margaretae Burn, 1966: synonym of Verconia haliclona (Burn, 1957)
- Noumea regalis Ortea, Caballer & Moro, 2001: synonym of Felimida regalis (Ortea, Caballer & Moro, 2001)
- Noumea sulphurea Rudman, 1986: synonym of Diversidoris sulphurea (Rudman, 1986)
- Noumea violacea Risbec, 1930: synonym of Hallaxa indecora (Bergh, 1905)
