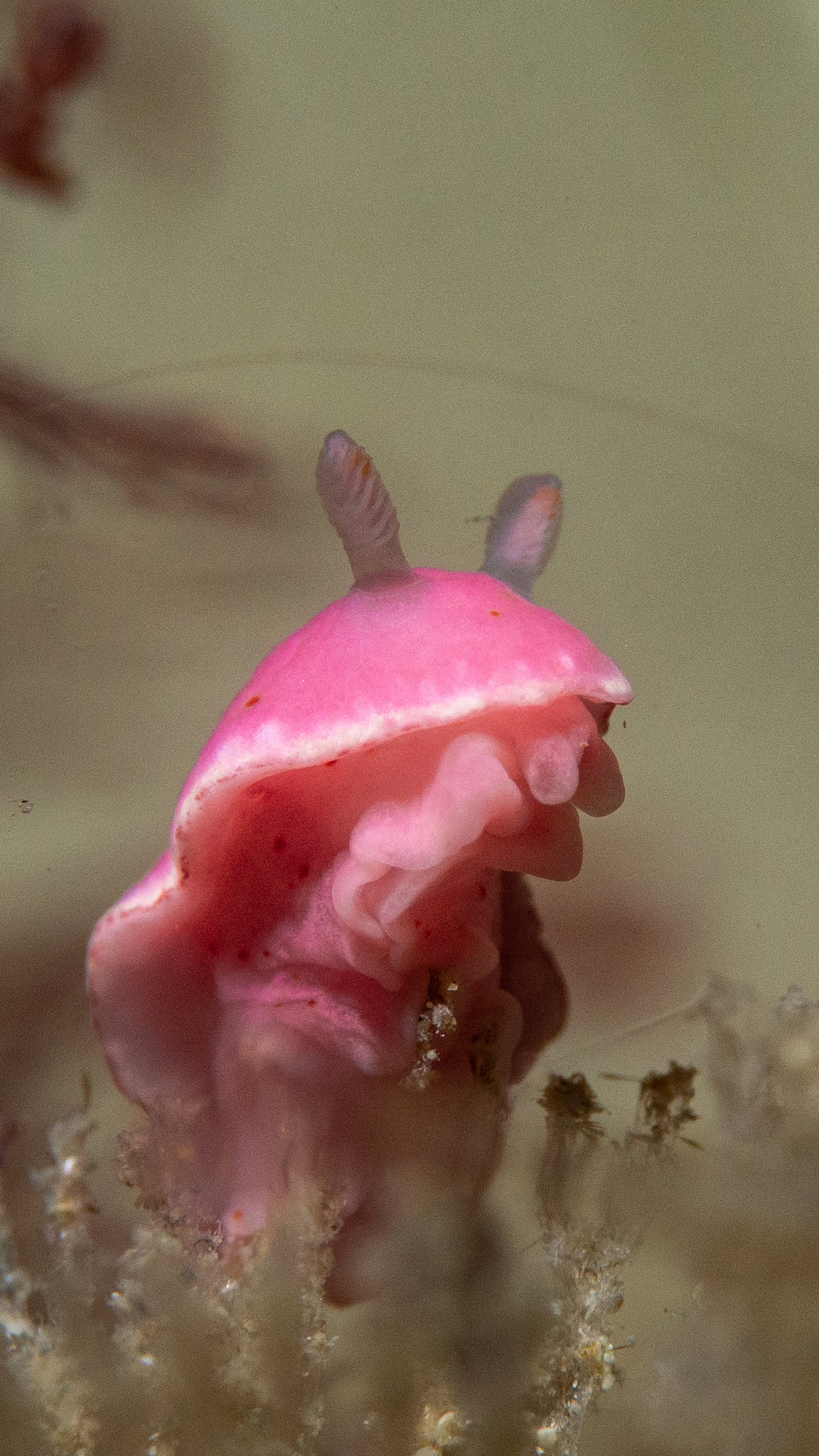

Scientific classification
- Kingdom: Animalia
- Phylum: Mollusca
- Class: Gastropoda
- Order: Nudibranchia
- Family: Chromodorididae
- Genus: Verconia
- Species: V. haliclona

Binomial name
- Verconia haliclona (Burn, 1957)

Synonyms
- Glossodoris haliclona Burn, 1957 (original combination); Noumea cameroni Burn, 1966; Noumea haliclona (Burn, 1957); Noumea margaretae Burn, 1966

= Verconia haliclona =

Species of gastropod

Verconia haliclona is a species of colourful sea slug, a dorid nudibranch, a shell-less marine gastropod mollusk in the family Chromodorididae.

== Distribution ==
This marine species is endemic to Australia and occurs at depths between 0–20 m off New South Wales, Queensland, South Australia, Tasmania, Victoria and Western Australia.

== Description ==
The length of the body varies between 6 mm and 18 mm. Their colour varies by region.

The main distinguishing features are small red/orange spots scattered across mantle and a red or orange mark on the front of the rhinophores. The body colour ranges from white to yellow or pink dependent upon location. There is often an orange edge to the mantle but this can be pale or absent in juveniles or in specimens from Tasmania.

Two V. haliclona perched upon the posterior end of a Verconia verconis.
