= Anilao =

Section of Mabini, Batangas

Coordinates: 13°45′39″N 120°55′44″E

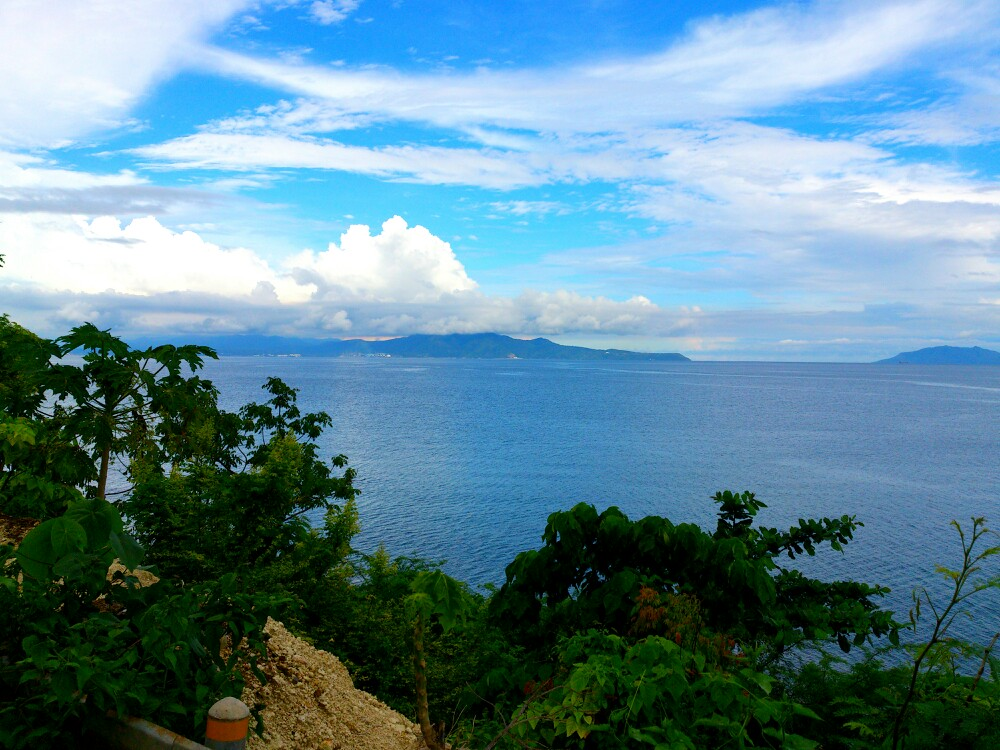
View from Anilao

Anilao Proper and Anilao East are two barangays in the municipality of Mabini, Batangas, the Philippines. They are located south of Manila on the large island of Luzon, at the southern end of the Calumpang Peninisula facing Maribacan Island. However, Anilao is now frequently used as a generic term for Mabini, Tingloy, and Bauan.

== Geography ==
The municipality of Mabini is a 32-kilometer stretch of rocky coastline with a land area of 4,296 hectares dominated by green hills and valleys. It is also characterized by a lack of rivers, so farmers need to rely on rainwater or wells for irrigation. The coastline is steep and the mountains fall abruptly in the ocean facing the Maricaban island in the south. In the North, Anilao connects after Bauan with the Taal Volcano area.

The western coast of Mabini is part of the Balayan bay, the eastern coast is part of the Batangas bay. The southern part of Mabini points toward Maribacan Island and connects with the Verde Island passage.

== Economics ==
The main economic activity of Anilao used to be fishing. Overfishing and in particular i) cyanide fishing which started in the 1960s to collect fish for aquariums as well as for the live food export to high end restaurants with China as a prime market, and ii) dynamite fishing for food fish led to reef bleaching and to the depletion of the marine environment. Marine protection measures have been implemented as a possible way to reverse this situation, but overfishing is still an issue.

Anilao principal economic resource is now tourism. Resorts are now populating the western Mabini coast. Agriculture is limited due to the lack of rivers in Mabini.

== Tourism ==
Anilao is well known for its underwater sports and trekking. The northwest shore of the Calumpang Peninsula, from Anilao to Bagalangit, is lined with local resorts that cater primarily to local tourists. Although the beach at Anilao is not recommended for swimming, thatched bamboo rafts, rustic cabins and picnic cabanas are available for rental at local resorts. From these resorts, one can also rent a boat for island hopping and visit the diving spots, coves, and islands like the Sombrero island (a hat-shaped rocky island surrounded with white sand) and Maricaban island.

=== Underwater sports ===
Anilao is popular with scuba divers, freedivers and snorkelers. It is considered the birthplace of scuba diving in the Philippines. The waters surrounding the area are teeming with marine life, plenty of corals, nudibranchs and amazing diversity of fishes.

Anilao has gained an international reputation for muck diving and underwater macro photography with world class competitions and workshops being organized every year. The rise of the diving sector has led to infrastructure benefits for the Anilao resident community.

Windsurfing and kayaking gradually developed as a follow-up of scuba diving.

=== Trekking ===
Trekking together with camping in the wild is another popular activity in Anilao mountains. Climbing Mt. Gulugod Baboy (“pig's spine”) is considered a must to discover the view up to Taal volcano. This easy trek includes three hills: Pinagbanderahan, Gitna, and Gulugod Baboy culminating 525 meters (1,722 ft) above sea level. From its summit, one can get a view of Balayan Bay, Maricaban Islands, and, on a clear day, Verde Island and even Abra de Ilog in Occidental Mindoro.

The main commercial activity is located in Anilao, there are some scattered convenience stores and small local eateries along the National road. Tourism and activities tend to be clustered around resorts, there are little independent restaurants around. After 08:00 PM, the place is usually very quiet, since the locals tend to start their day early after sunrise.

== Marine life ==
The marine conservation story of Anilao began with the work of the Haribon Foundation. In 1991, the first marine sanctuaries were created in Bagalangit and San Teodoro. The year 1998 marked the second wave of such marine conservation efforts.

Anilao features a great diversity of colorful and healthy marine life including turtles, corals, barrel sponges, macro photography subjects such as underwater critters inc. Colemani shrimps, Bobbit worms, cowries and nudibranch (563 species already identified). There is a great diversity of rare fishes, notably pygmy sea-horses, rhinopias, hairy frog fish. Different types of octopus can be seen including Mimic, Wonderpus and blue ringed octopus. Most species on the muck and macro diving critter wish list can be found in Anilao. One should be wary of stonefish in shallow waters.

The reef is very healthly and a large variety of soft and hard corals can be observed in shallow and deeper waters. Bigger fish, barracudas and sand sharks, are prevalent in areas where currents are stronger, especially around Mainit Point, in the Maricaban Strait. Large schools of jacks, giant seahorses and moray eels can also be spotted. Dolphins and endangered small whale sharks have been seen occasionally.

Threats to the Anilao marine life include overfishing, insufficient waste management, too lenient sewers management enforcement and the rejects from the large cargos that ply this route. Despite the adoption of coastal cleaning as a provincial annual event, regular beach cleaning remains an issue as many of them are littered with debris, especially plastics.

== Gallery ==
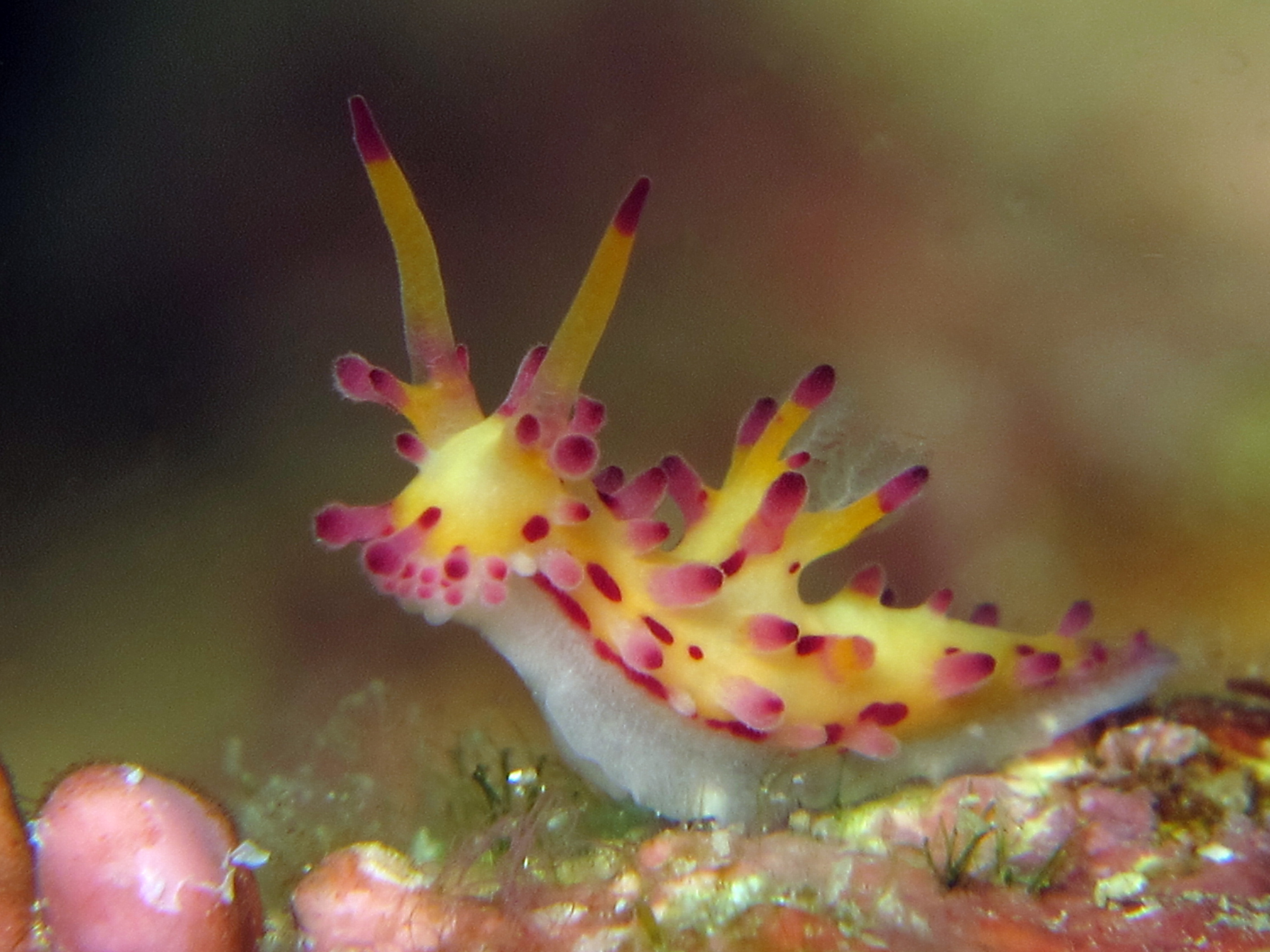
An Aegires villosus in Anilao

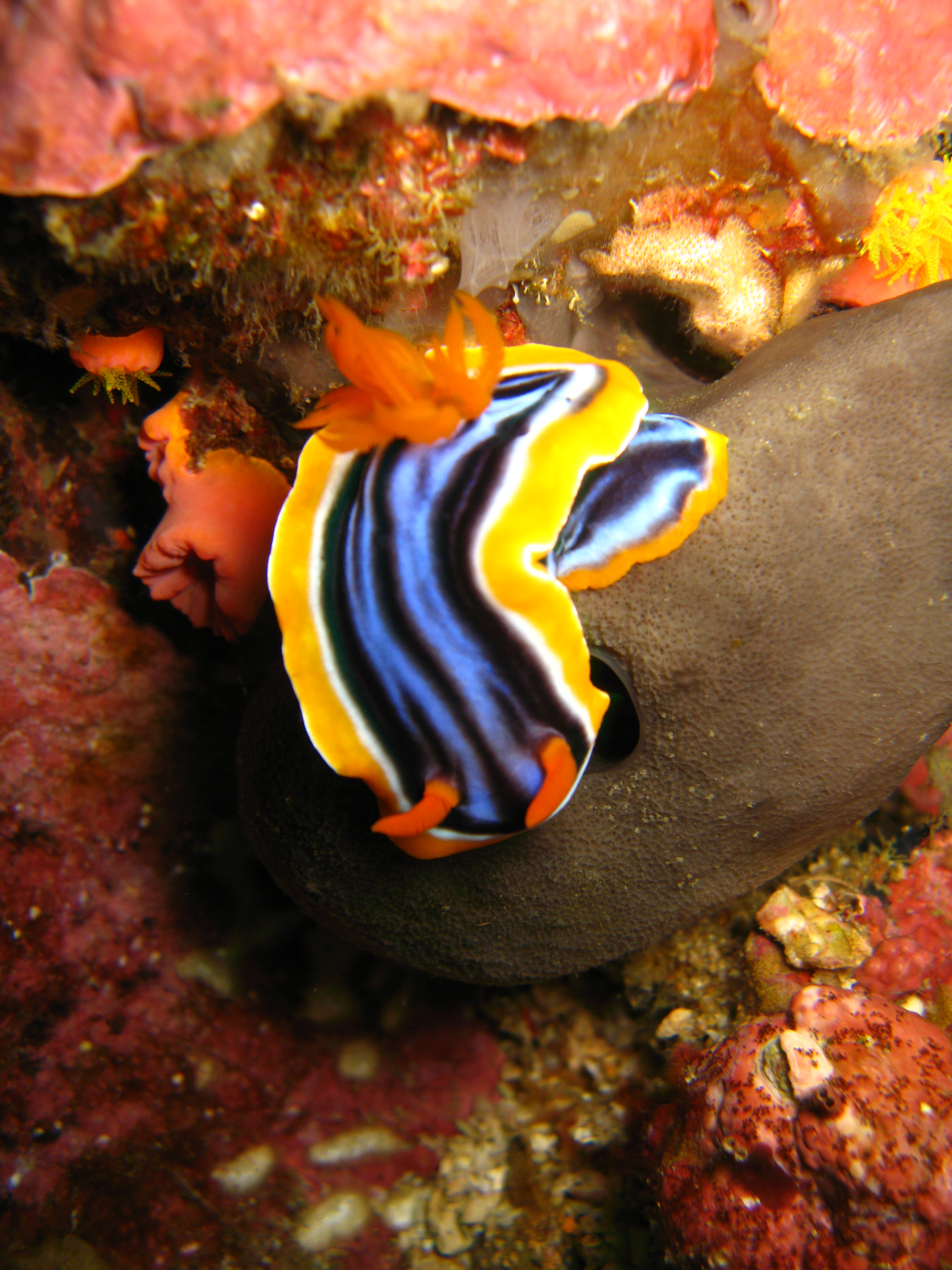
A Chromodoris magnifica in Anilao

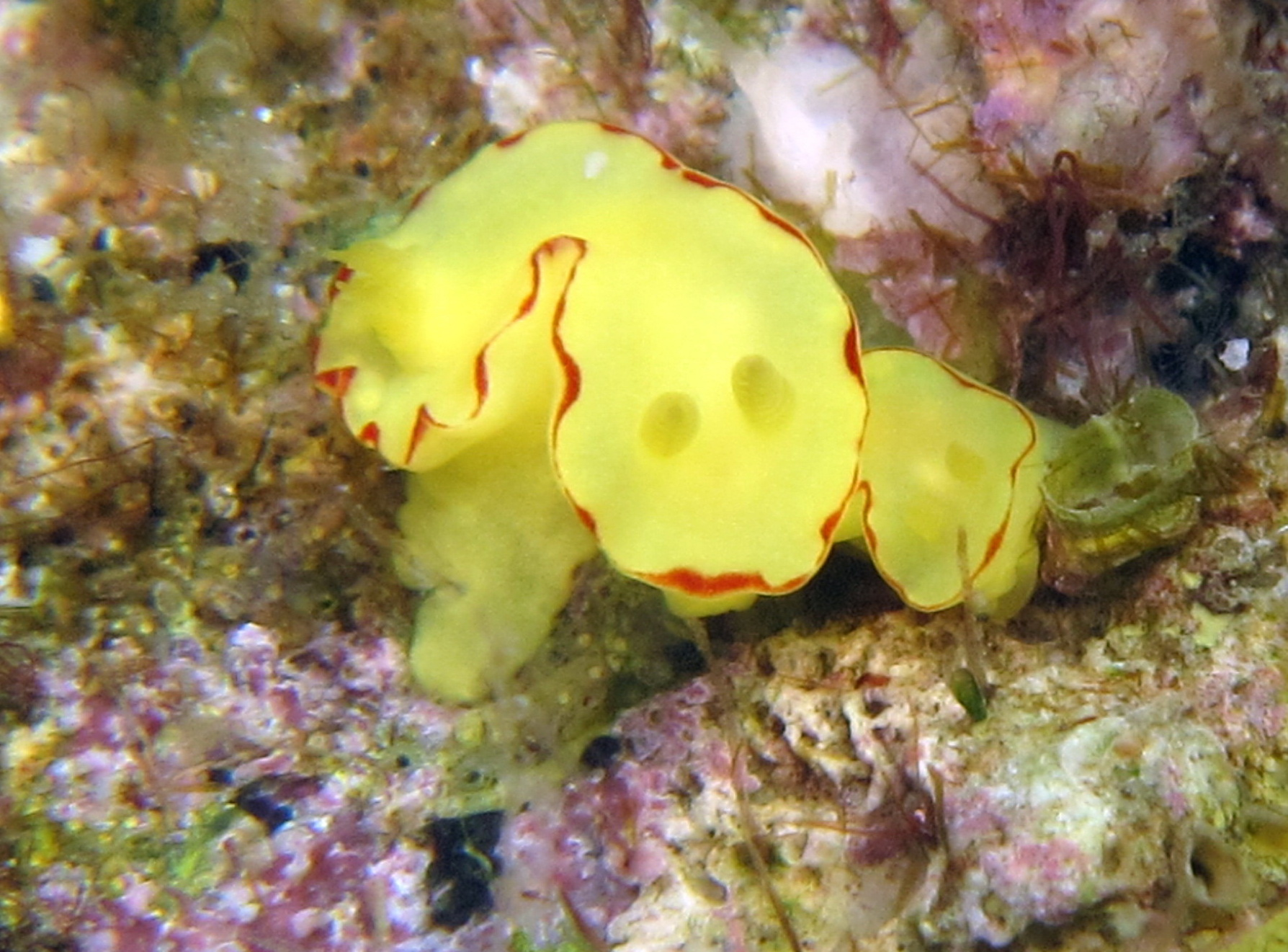
A Noumea flava in Anilao

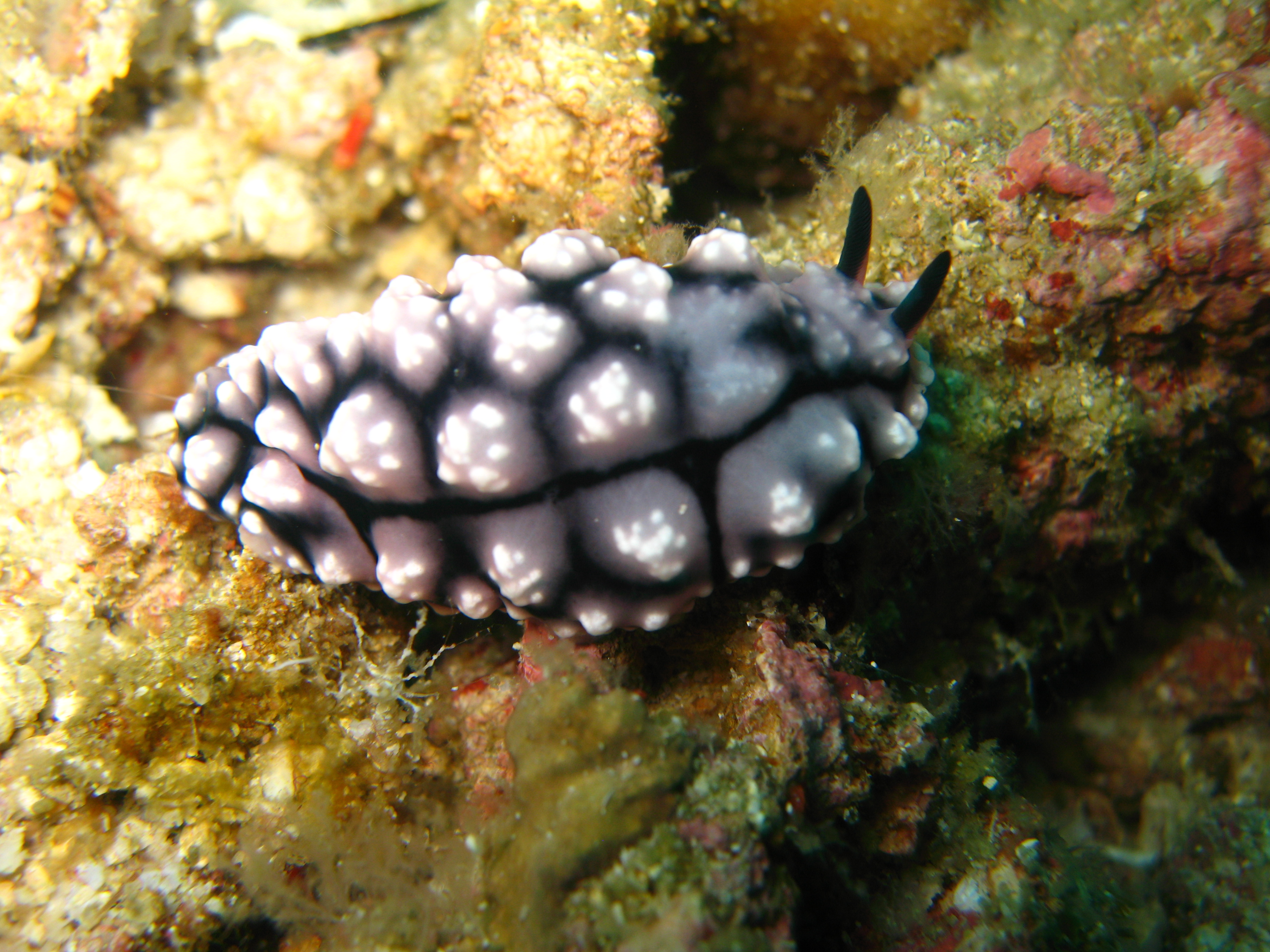
A Phyllidiella pustulosa in Anilao

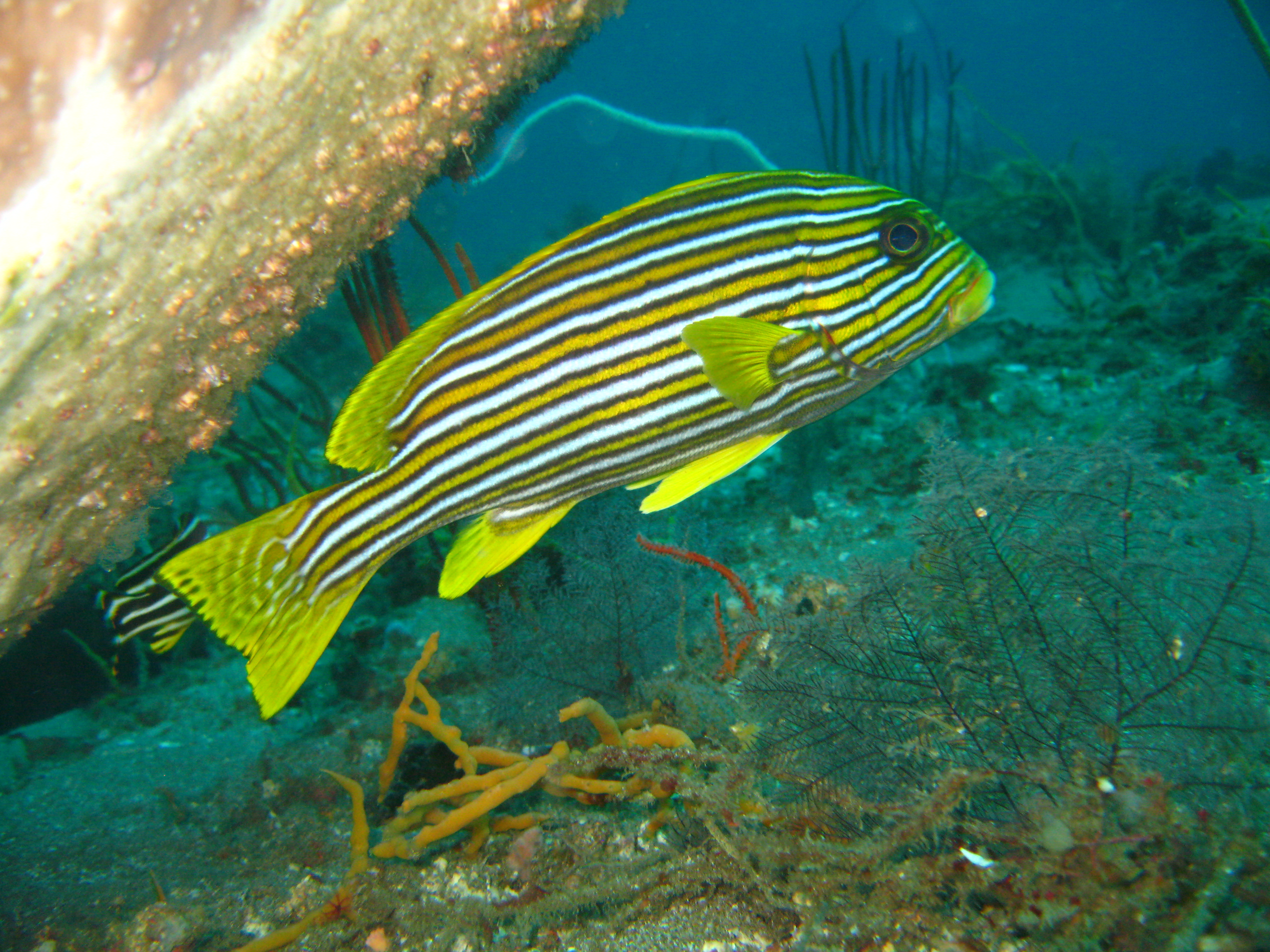
A Ribboned sweetlips in Anilao
