= Anilao (disambiguation) =

Anilao may refer to various places in the Philippines:

- Anilao, Iloilo
- Anilao, Mabini, Batangas, a resort known for diving and snorkeling
