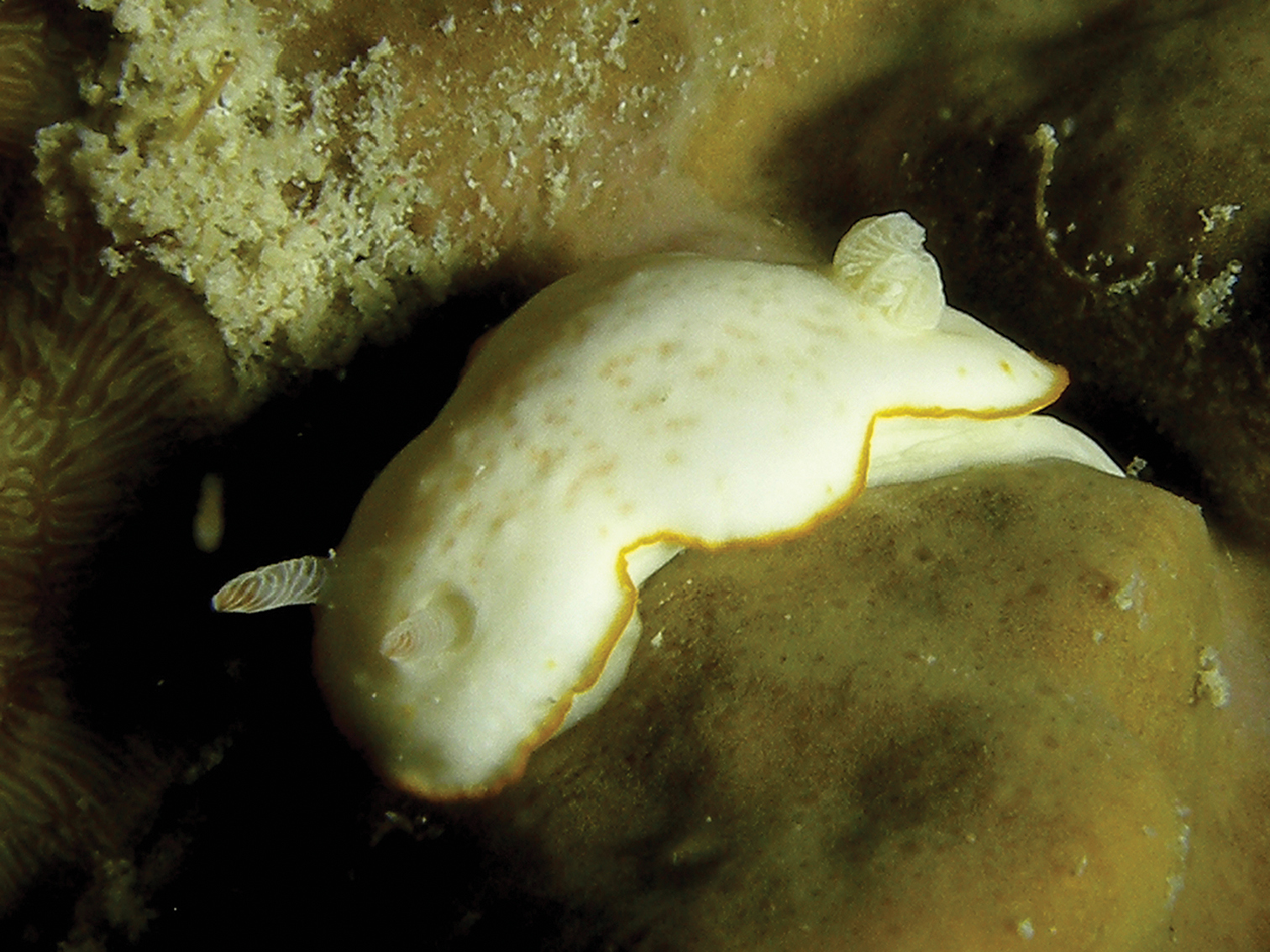

Scientific classification
- Kingdom: Animalia
- Phylum: Mollusca
- Class: Gastropoda
- Order: Nudibranchia
- Family: Chromodorididae
- Genus: Verconia
- Species: V. sudanica

Binomial name
- Verconia sudanica Rudman, 1985

Synonyms
- Noumea sudanica Rudman, 1985

= Verconia sudanica =

Species of gastropod

Verconia sudanica is a species of colourful sea slug, a dorid nudibranch, a shell-less marine gastropod mollusk in the family Chromodorididae.
