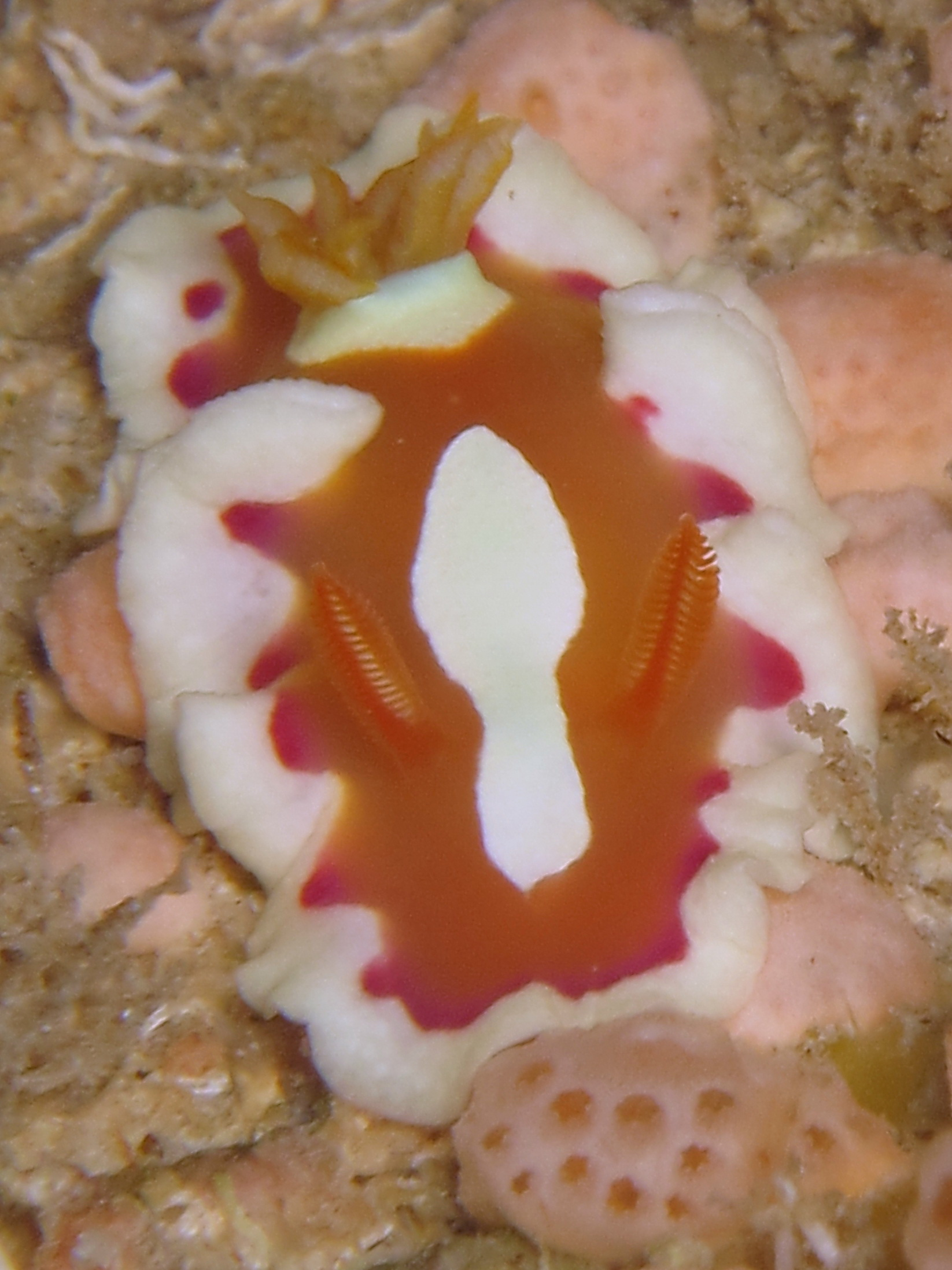
- Verconia norba off of Guam, head end towards the bottom of the image

Scientific classification
- Kingdom: Animalia
- Phylum: Mollusca
- Class: Gastropoda
- Order: Nudibranchia
- Family: Chromodorididae
- Genus: Verconia
- Species: V. norba

Binomial name
- Verconia norba (Er. Marcus & Ev. Marcus, 1970)

Synonyms
- Noumea norba Er. Marcus & Ev. Marcus, 1970

= Verconia norba =

Species of gastropod

Verconia norba is a species of colorful sea slug, a dorid nudibranch, a shell-less marine gastropod mollusk in the family Chromodorididae.

== Distribution ==
This species is found throughout the tropical Indo-West Pacific.

== Description ==
The length of the body varies between 7 mm and 25 mm. In this species the mantle can vary in color from reddish purple to pinkish orange. The mantle border is creamy white. Just inside the mantle border are a series of reddish purple streaks or smudged marks which are a more vibrant purple than the main body color. Along the midline of the animal is a white patch that matches the white border. This patch sometimes encircles the gills and extends anteriorly between the rhinophores. The line is often broken into two patches anterior-posteriorly. The rhinophores and branchia (gills) have an orange-red tint. Identifying individual purple sea slugs within the genus Noumea can be challenging because purple forms exist in several related species.

== Ecology ==
The food source for this species has not been definitely identified, however this species has been found on coralline alga, which may prove to be part of its diet.
