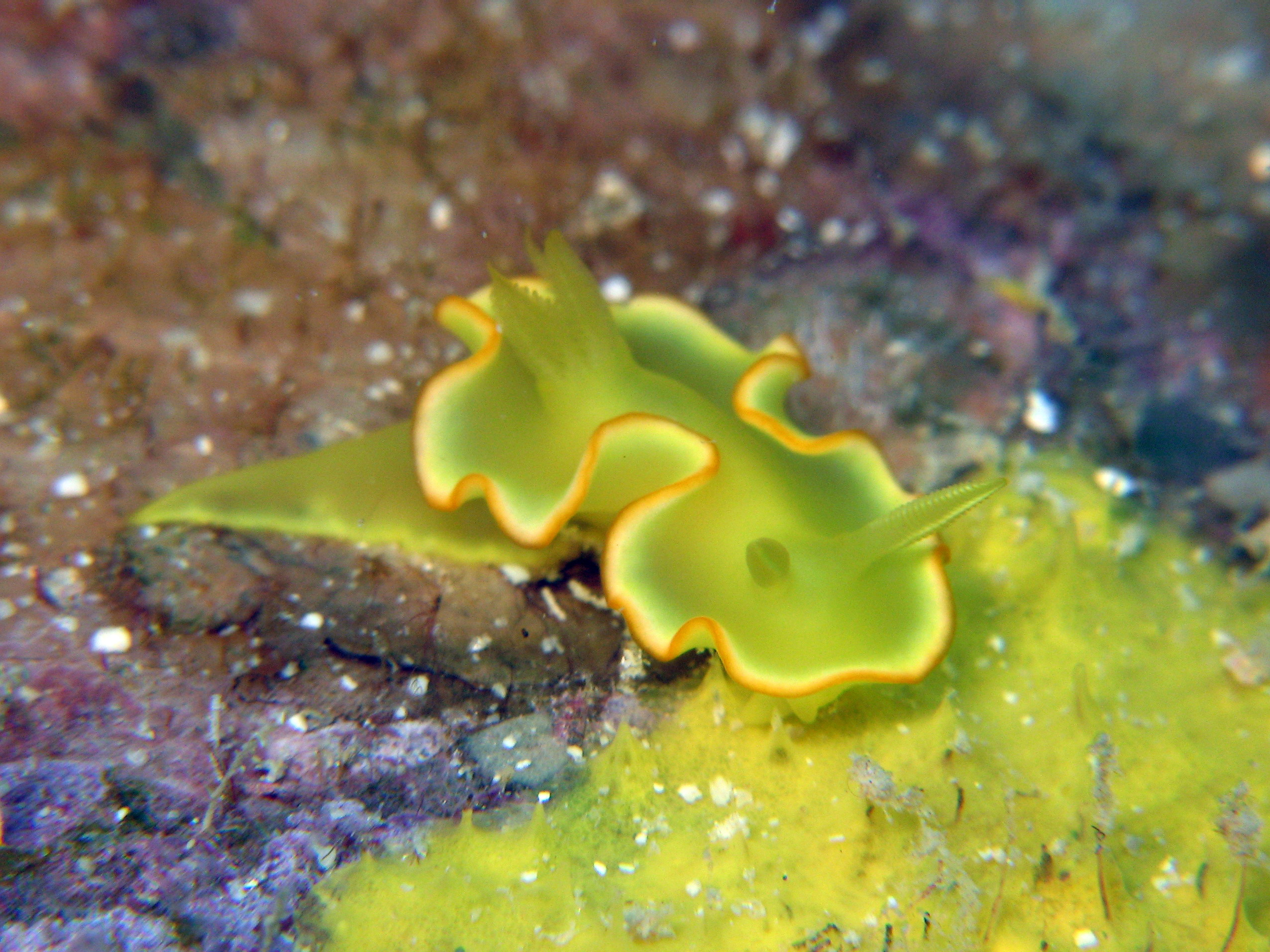
- Diversidoris crocea

Scientific classification
- Kingdom: Animalia
- Phylum: Mollusca
- Class: Gastropoda
- Order: Nudibranchia
- Family: Chromodorididae
- Genus: Diversidoris; Rudman, 1987

Type species
- Diversidoris aurantionodulosa Rudman, 1987

= Diversidoris =

Genus of gastropods

Diversidoris is a genus of sea slugs, dorid nudibranchs, shell-less marine gastropod mollusks in the family Chromodorididae. This clade is supported by molecular phylogeny.

== Species ==
Species in the genus Diversidoris include:

- Diversidoris aurantionodulosa Rudman, 1987
- Diversidoris crocea (Rudman, 1986)
- Diversidoris flava (Eliot, 1904)
- Diversidoris sulphurea (Rudman, 1986)
