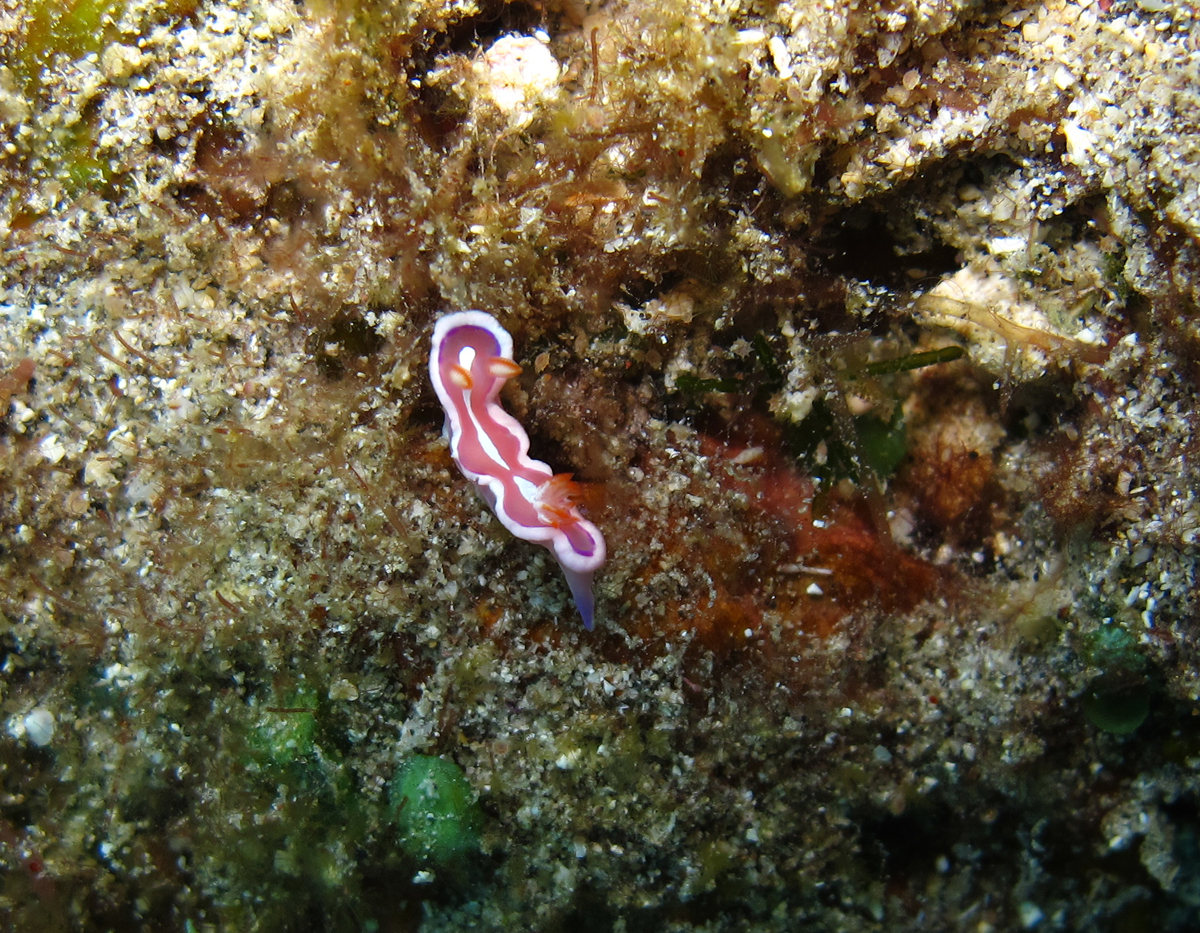

Scientific classification
- Kingdom: Animalia
- Phylum: Mollusca
- Class: Gastropoda
- Order: Nudibranchia
- Family: Chromodorididae
- Genus: Verconia
- Species: V. varians

Binomial name
- Verconia varians (Pease, 1871)

Synonyms
- Chromodoris gloriosa Bergh, 1874; Chromodoris varians Pease, 1871 (original combination); Noumea varians (Pease, 1871)

= Verconia varians =

Species of gastropod

Verconia varians is a species of colorful sea slug, a dorid nudibranch, a shell-less marine gastropod mollusk in the family Chromodorididae.

== Distribution ==
This marine species is widely distributed in the Indo-Pacific from Indonesia to the Hawaiian Islands.

== Description ==
- Body: translucent coloration with a segmented white stripe on the midline, a white mantle margin, and a magenta submarginal line.
- Rhinophores: translucent base with orange tips
- Gills: translucent base with magenta tips

This species is one of several chromodorids that vibrate their gills. Up to 20 mm in length.
