= Verconia catalai =

Scientific classification
- Kingdom: Animalia
- Phylum: Mollusca
- Class: Gastropoda
- Order: Nudibranchia
- Family: Chromodorididae
- Genus: Verconia
- Species: V. catalai

Binomial name
- Verconia catalai William B. Rudman, 1990

Synonyms
- Noumea catalai Rudman, 1990

Species of gastropod

Verconia catalai is a species of colourful sea slug, a dorid nudibranch, a shell-less marine gastropod mollusk in the family Chromodorididae.
