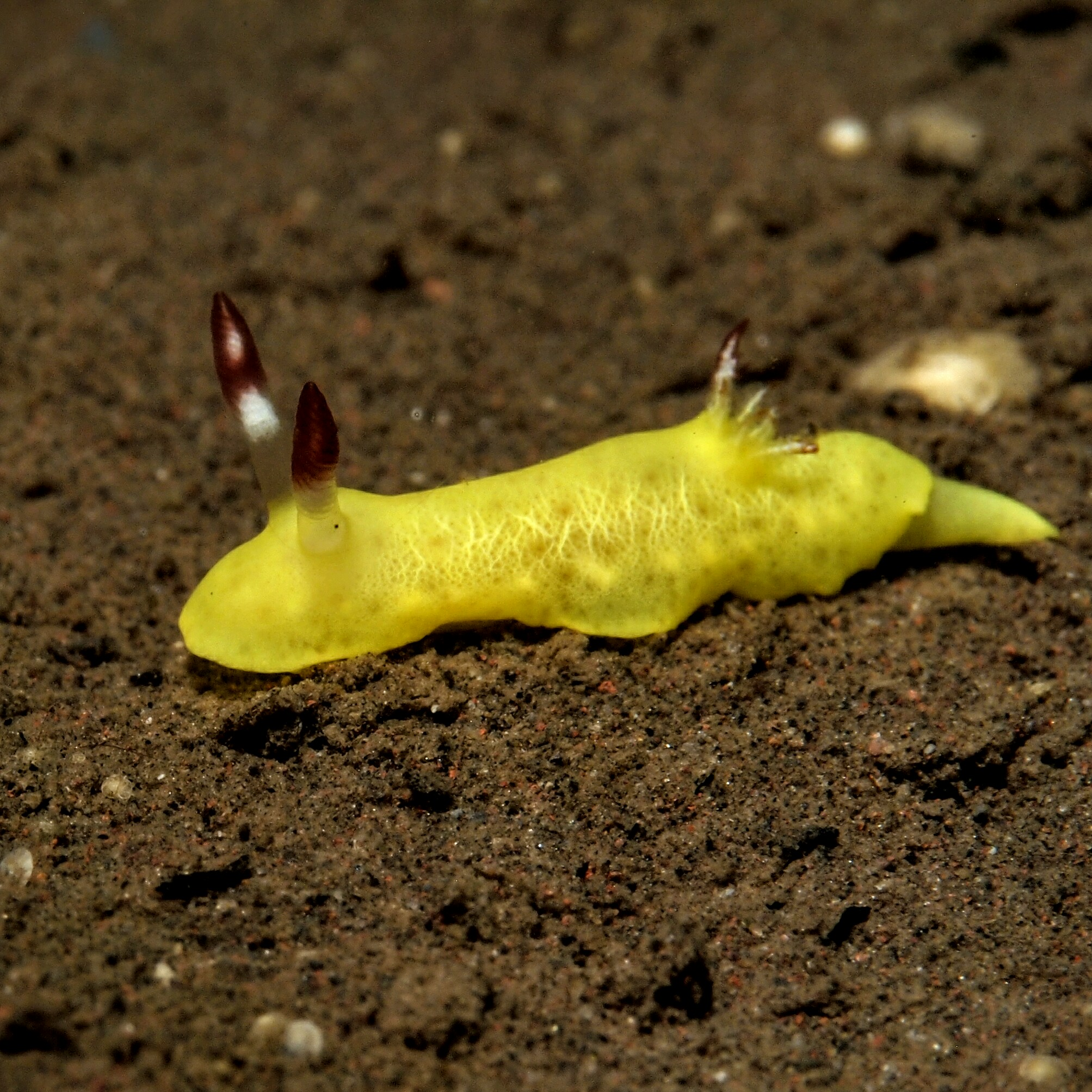
- Verconia cf. laboutei

Scientific classification
- Kingdom: Animalia
- Phylum: Mollusca
- Class: Gastropoda
- Order: Nudibranchia
- Family: Chromodorididae
- Genus: Verconia
- Species: V. laboutei

Binomial name
- Verconia laboutei William B. Rudman, 1986

Synonyms
- Noumea laboutei Rudman, 1986

= Verconia laboutei =

Species of gastropod

Verconia laboutei is a species of colourful sea slug, a dorid nudibranch, a shell-less marine gastropod mollusk in the family Chromodorididae.
