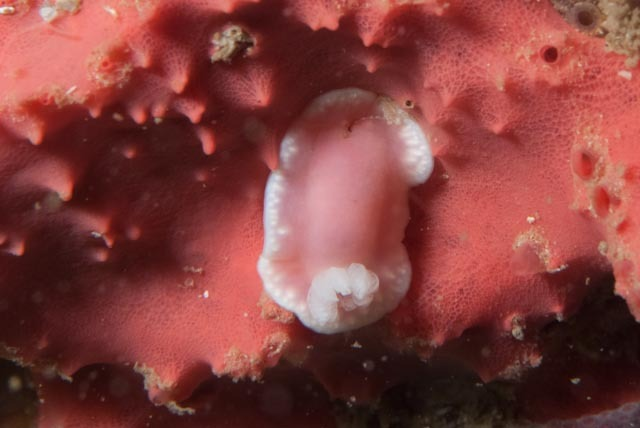
- Verconia protea
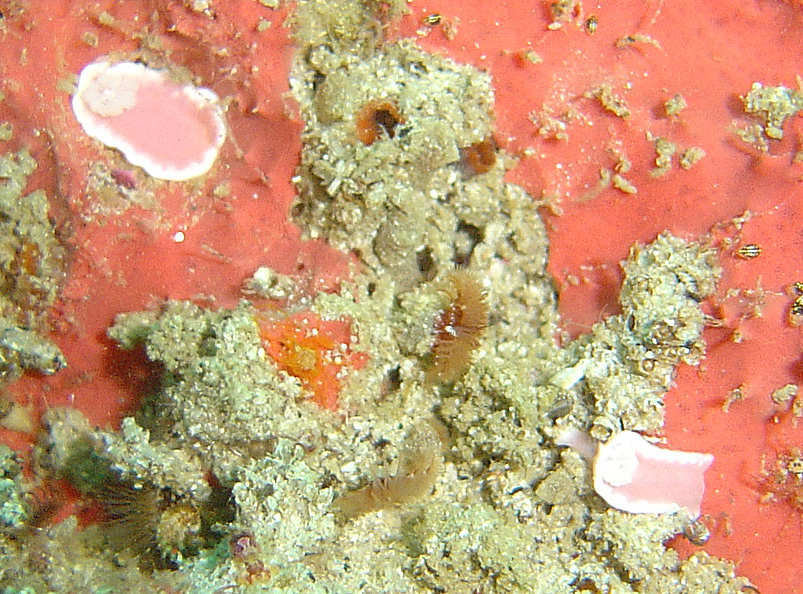
- Two Verconia protea (top left, bottom right) on a sponge near Gordon's Bay, South Africa

Scientific classification
- Kingdom: Animalia
- Phylum: Mollusca
- Class: Gastropoda
- Order: Nudibranchia
- Family: Chromodorididae
- Genus: Verconia
- Species: V. protea

Binomial name
- Verconia protea Gosliner, 1994

Synonyms
- Noumea protea Gosliner, 1994

= Verconia protea =

Species of gastropod

Verconia protea is a species of colourful sea slug, a dorid nudibranch, a shell-less marine gastropod mollusk in the family Chromodorididae.

== Distribution ==
Known only from Oudekraal and Vulcan Rock on the Cape Peninsula west coast and Pinnacle dive site near Gordon's Bay on the east side of False Bay. South African endemic.

== Description ==
A small (15mm) dorid with a smooth salmon pink body and white dotted margin.

== Ecology ==
Often found on an encrusting sponge of almost identical colour at depths of 8 to 10m.
