= Verconia parva =

Scientific classification
- Kingdom: Animalia
- Phylum: Mollusca
- Class: Gastropoda
- Order: Nudibranchia
- Family: Chromodorididae
- Genus: Verconia
- Species: V. parva

Binomial name
- Verconia parva (Baba, 1949)

Synonyms
- Noumea parva Baba, 1949

Species of gastropod

Verconia parva is a species of colourful sea slug, a dorid nudibranch, a shell-less marine gastropod mollusk in the family Chromodorididae.

== Distribution ==
This marine species occurs off Japan.
