= Verconia hongkongiensis =

Scientific classification
- Kingdom: Animalia
- Phylum: Mollusca
- Class: Gastropoda
- Order: Nudibranchia
- Family: Chromodorididae
- Genus: Verconia
- Species: V. hongkongiensis

Binomial name
- Verconia hongkongiensis William B. Rudman, 1990

Synonyms
- Noumea hongkongensis [sic] (misspelling); Noumea hongkongiensis Rudman, 1990

Species of gastropod

Verconia hongkongiensis is a species of colourful sea slug, a dorid nudibranch, a shell-less marine gastropod mollusk in the family Chromodorididae.
