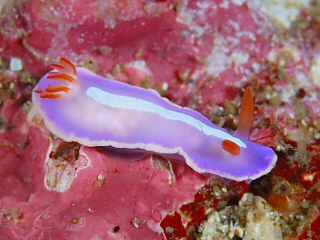

Scientific classification
- Kingdom: Animalia
- Phylum: Mollusca
- Class: Gastropoda
- Order: Nudibranchia
- Family: Chromodorididae
- Genus: Verconia
- Species: V. purpurea

Binomial name
- Verconia purpurea Baba, 1949

= Verconia purpurea =

Species of gastropod

Verconia purpurea is a species of colourful sea slug, a dorid nudibranch, a shell-less marine gastropod mollusk in the family Chromodorididae. It was first described in 1949 by Kikutaro Baba as Noumea purpurea.

The length of the body attains 20 mm.

== Distribution ==
This marine species occurs off subtropical Japan. It is also found on the Great Barrier Reef.
