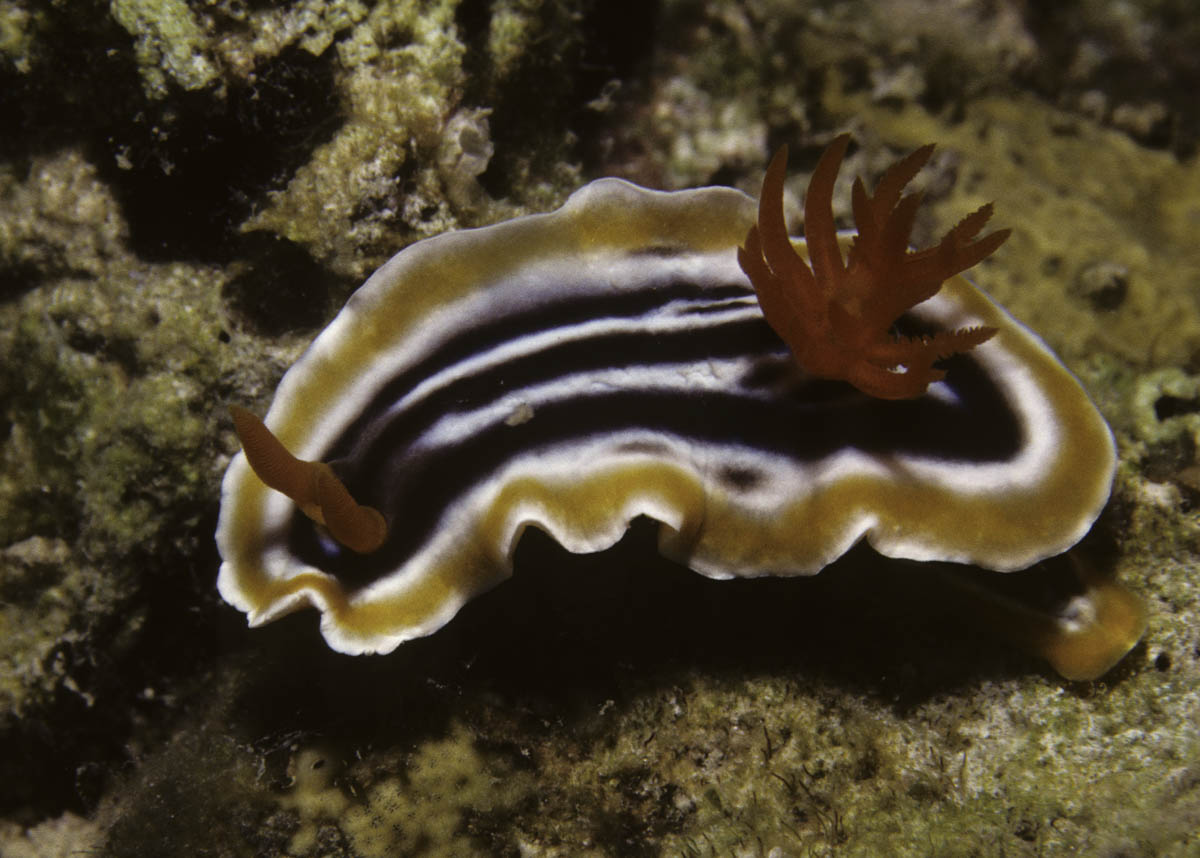
- The nudibranch Chromodoris magnifica, Mactan Island, Cebu, Philippines.

Scientific classification
- Kingdom: Animalia
- Phylum: Mollusca
- Class: Gastropoda
- Order: Nudibranchia
- Family: Chromodorididae
- Genus: Chromodoris
- Species: C. magnifica

Binomial name
- Chromodoris magnifica (Quoy & Gaimard, 1832)

= Chromodoris magnifica =

Species of gastropod

Chromodoris magnifica, also known as the magnificent sea slug, is a sea slug, a species of nudibranch, a shell-less marine gastropod mollusc in the family Chromodorididae. It is the type species of the genus Chromodoris.

== Distribution ==
This nudibranch is found in the central area of the Indo-Pacific region from Indonesia and the Philippines to New Guinea and Eastern Australia.

== Description ==
Chromodoris magnifica can reach a maximum size of 60 mm (2.4 in) in length. The body is elongate with a foot which is distinct from the upper body by a skirt like mantle hiding partially the foot. The branched gills and the rhinophores are orange colour and can be withdrawn into specific pockets under the skin in case of danger. The specific epithet magnifica in Chromodoris magnifica means magnificent, so-named because of this nudibranch's striking, vibrant colors.

The background colour of the body is bluish white which varies in intensity from one specimen to another. On the mantle, the bluish area is outlined by two continuous black lines and a median continuous line crosses it also. These bluish parts are often marked with dash-like black lines. The margin of the mantle is bordered with a large white band with a central orange colour line, the width of these lines is variable for each specimen. The foot has three black continuous longitudinal lines. Its background colour is the same as its mantle. The margin of the foot is outlined by an orange and a white line.

This species is easily confused with the similar looking Chromodoris quadricolor. Chromodoris magnifica can be distinguished by its submarginal orange border.

== Ecology ==
Chromodoris magnifica feeds on sponges and has been observed feeding on red and grey sponges.

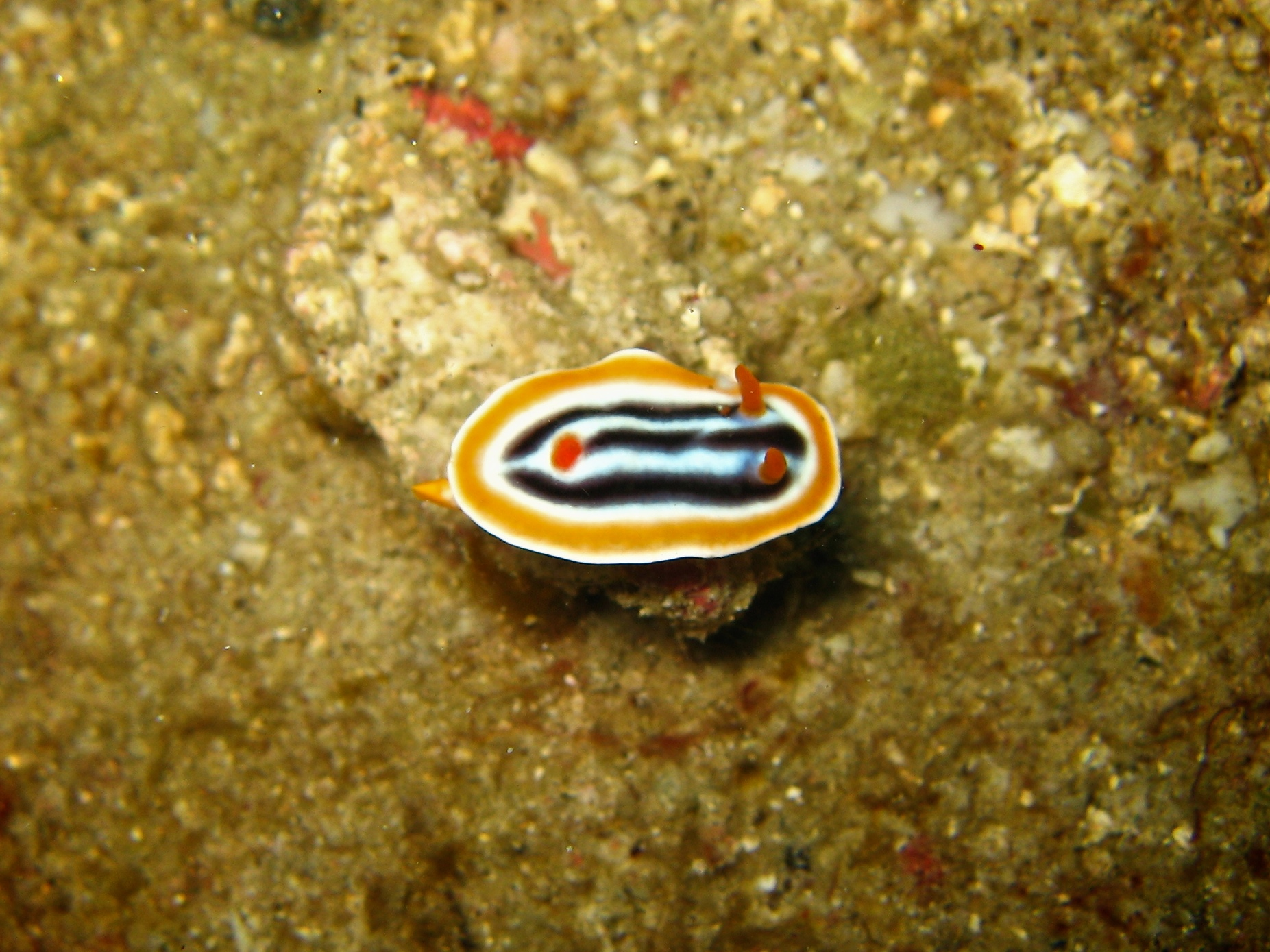
Chromodoris magnifica juvenile in Puerto Galera, Philippines.

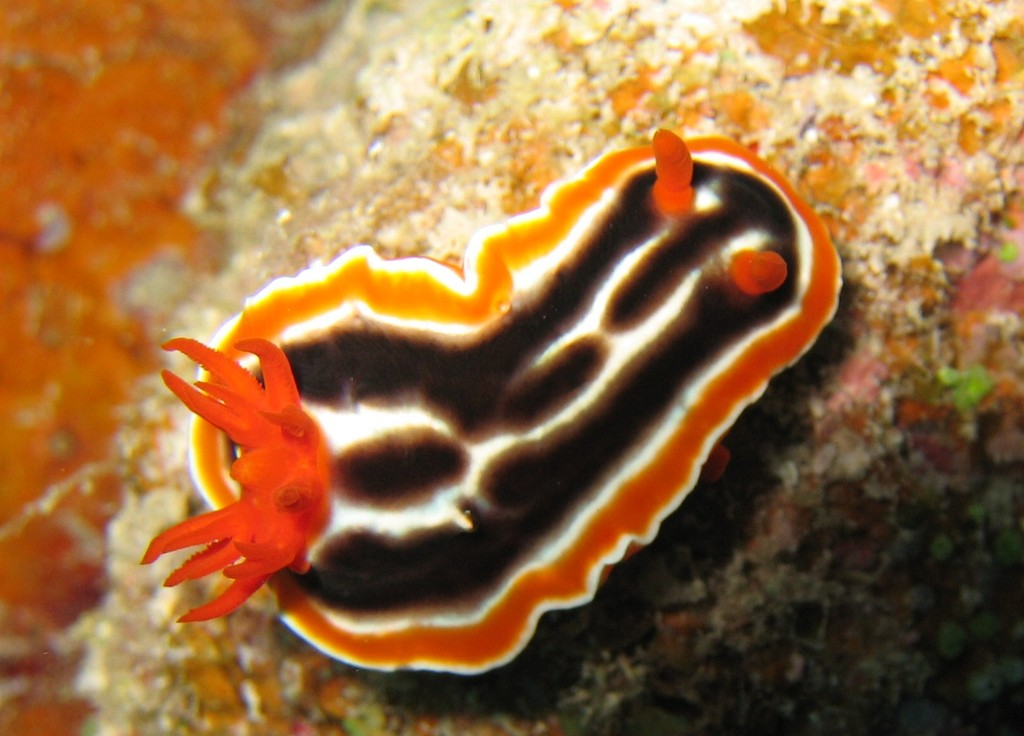
Chromodoris magnifica.
