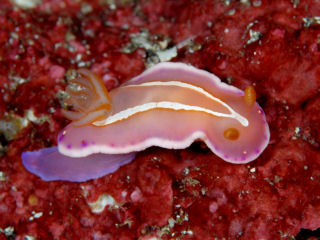

Scientific classification
- Kingdom: Animalia
- Phylum: Mollusca
- Class: Gastropoda
- Order: Nudibranchia
- Family: Chromodorididae
- Genus: Verconia
- Species: V. alboannulata

Binomial name
- Verconia alboannulata William B. Rudman, 1986

Synonyms
- Noumea alboannulata Rudman, 1986

= Verconia alboannulata =

Species of gastropod

Verconia alboannulata is a species of colourful sea slug, a dorid nudibranch, a shell-less marine gastropod mollusk in the family Chromodorididae.

== Distribution ==
This species occurs in the Red Sea and off Australia (Queensland).
