= Diversidoris aurantionodulosa =

Scientific classification
- Kingdom: Animalia
- Phylum: Mollusca
- Class: Gastropoda
- Order: Nudibranchia
- Family: Chromodorididae
- Genus: Diversidoris
- Species: D. aurantionodulosa

Binomial name
- Diversidoris aurantionodulosa Rudman, 1987

Species of gastropod

Diversidoris aurantionodulosa is a species of sea slug or dorid nudibranch, a marine gastropod mollusk in the family Chromodorididae.

== Distribution ==
The type locality for this species is Dar Es Salaam, Tanzania. Additional material from Hong Kong and Australia was included in the original description.
