= Verconia spencerensis =

Scientific classification
- Kingdom: Animalia
- Phylum: Mollusca
- Class: Gastropoda
- Order: Nudibranchia
- Family: Chromodorididae
- Genus: Verconia
- Species: V. spencerensis

Binomial name
- Verconia spencerensis Rudman, 1987

Synonyms
- Noumea spencerensis Rudman, 1987

Species of gastropod

Verconia spencerensis is a species of colourful sea slug, a dorid nudibranch, a shell-less marine gastropod mollusk in the family Chromodorididae. This species is localized to Australia.

== Distribution ==
This species was described from sixteen specimens collected on wharf piles at Warna Point, Louth Bay, Eyre Peninsula, South Australia, 34.54026°S 135.93410°E.

== Description ==
Verconia spencerensis has a deep pink mantle which is mottled with opaque white and has a submarginal row of bright reddish orange spots. The gills and rhinophores are translucent white dusted with opaque white.

The body colour range from yellow to red, scattered with red or orange spots. With a red or orange mark on the front of the rhinophore club. It feeds on a range of pink and yellow aplysillid sponges.

This species is endemic to Australia.
