= Verconia closeorum =

Scientific classification
- Kingdom: Animalia
- Phylum: Mollusca
- Class: Gastropoda
- Order: Nudibranchia
- Family: Chromodorididae
- Genus: Verconia
- Species: V. closeorum

Binomial name
- Verconia closeorum William B. Rudman, 1986

Synonyms
- Noumea closei Rudman, 1986 (incorrect original spelling); Noumea closeorum Rudman, 1986

Species of gastropod

Verconia closeorum is a species of colourful sea slug, a dorid nudibranch, a shell-less marine gastropod mollusk in the family Chromodorididae.

== Distribution ==
This marine species is endemic to Australia and occurs off South Australia, Tasmania and Victoria
