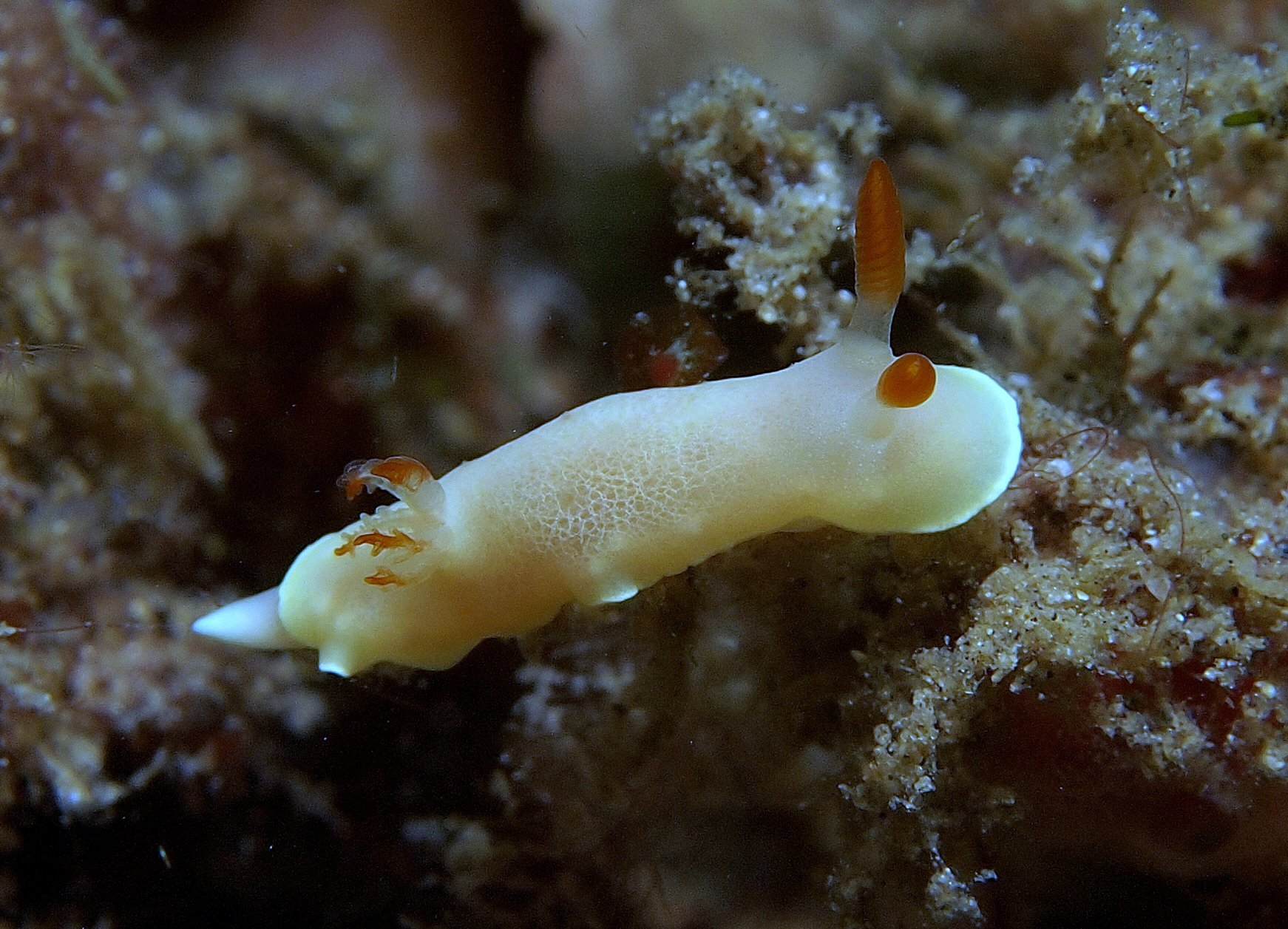

Scientific classification
- Kingdom: Animalia
- Phylum: Mollusca
- Class: Gastropoda
- Order: Nudibranchia
- Family: Chromodorididae
- Genus: Verconia
- Species: V. verconiforma

Binomial name
- Verconia verconiforma Rudman, 1995

Synonyms
- Noumea verconiforma Rudman, 1995

= Verconia verconiforma =

Species of gastropod

Verconia verconiforma is a species of colourful sea slug, a dorid nudibranch, a shell-less marine gastropod mollusk in the family Chromodorididae.
