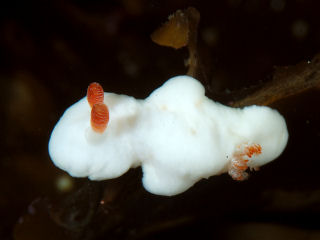

Scientific classification
- Kingdom: Animalia
- Phylum: Mollusca
- Class: Gastropoda
- Order: Nudibranchia
- Family: Chromodorididae
- Genus: Verconia
- Species: V. simplex

Binomial name
- Verconia simplex (Pease, 1871)

Synonyms
- Chromodoris simplex Pease, 1871 (original combination); Noumea simplex (Pease, 1871)

= Verconia simplex =

Species of gastropod

Verconia simplex is a species of colourful sea slug, a dorid nudibranch, a shell-less marine gastropod mollusk in the family Chromodorididae.

== Distribution ==
This marine species occurs in the tropical West Pacific and off Australia (Queensland).

== Description ==
The length of the body varies between 5 mm and 14 mm.
