= Verconia decussata =

Scientific classification
- Kingdom: Animalia
- Phylum: Mollusca
- Class: Gastropoda
- Order: Nudibranchia
- Family: Chromodorididae
- Genus: Verconia
- Species: V. decussata

Binomial name
- Verconia decussata Risbec, 1928

Synonyms
- Glossodoris decussata (Risbec, 1928); Noumea decussata Risbec, 1928; Thorunna decussata (Risbec, 1928)

Species of gastropod

Verconia decussata is a species of colourful sea slug, a dorid nudibranch, a shell-less marine gastropod mollusk in the family Chromodorididae.

== Distribution ==
This marine species occurs off New Caledonia.
