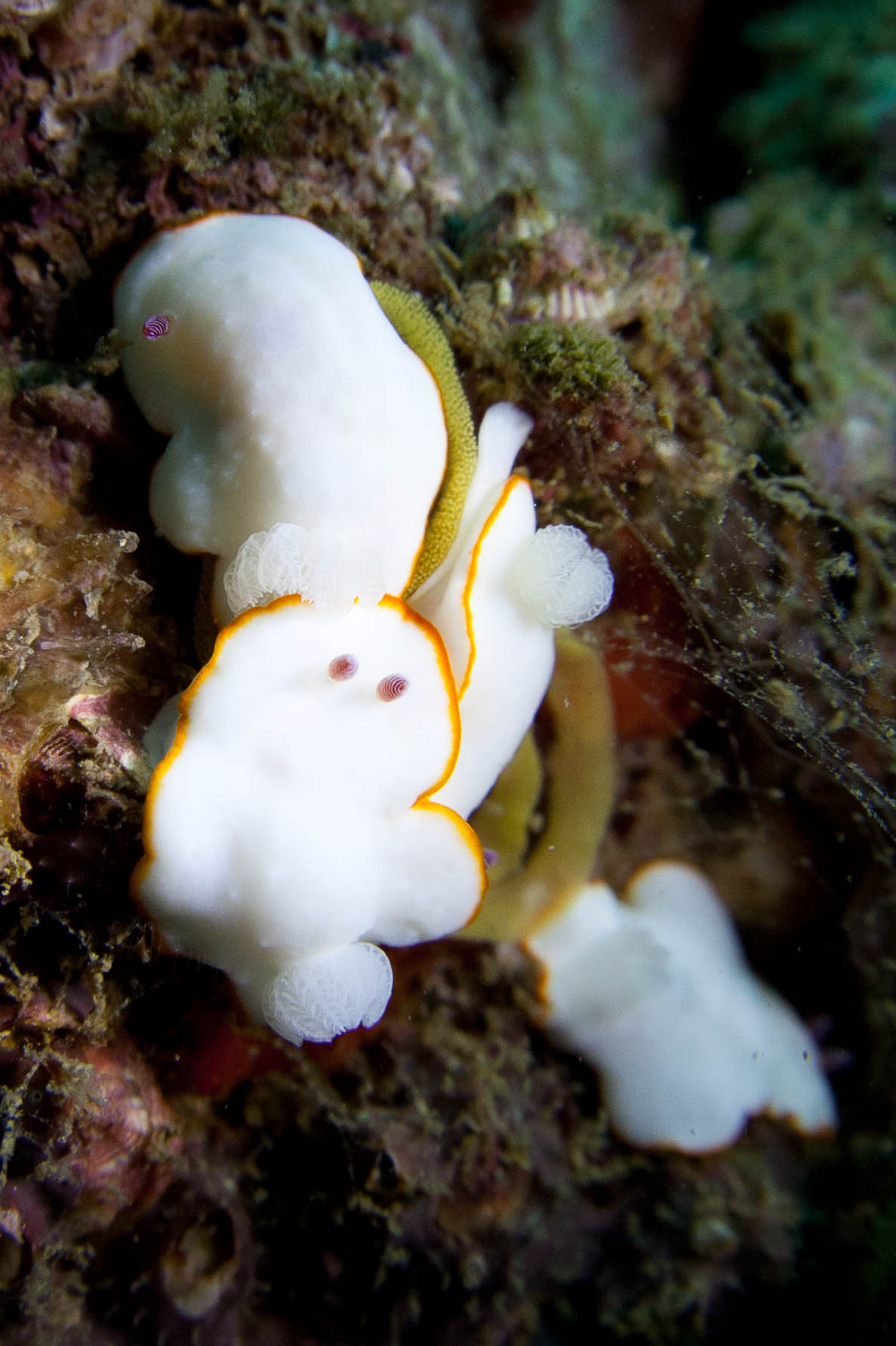

Scientific classification
- Kingdom: Animalia
- Phylum: Mollusca
- Class: Gastropoda
- Order: Nudibranchia
- Family: Chromodorididae
- Genus: Verconia
- Species: V. subnivalis

Binomial name
- Verconia subnivalis Baba, 1987

Synonyms
- Noumea subnivalis Baba, 1987

= Verconia subnivalis =

Species of gastropod

Verconia subnivalis is a species of colourful sea slug, a dorid nudibranch, a shell-less marine gastropod mollusk in the family Chromodorididae.
