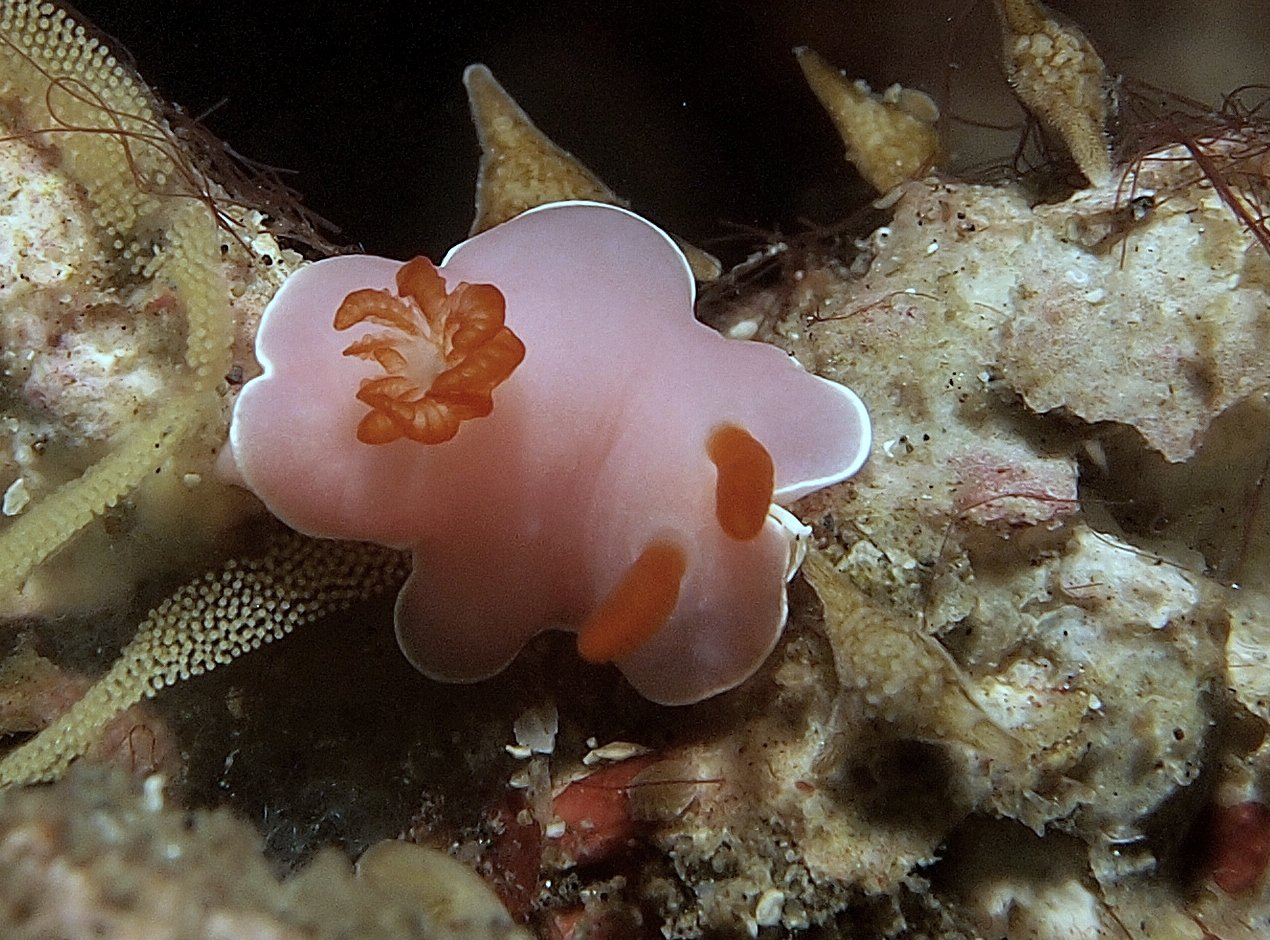

Scientific classification
- Kingdom: Animalia
- Phylum: Mollusca
- Class: Gastropoda
- Order: Nudibranchia
- Family: Chromodorididae
- Genus: Verconia
- Species: V. romeri

Binomial name
- Verconia romeri Risbec, 1928

Synonyms
- Noumea romeri Risbec, 1928

= Verconia romeri =

Species of gastropod

Verconia romeri is a species of colourful sea slug, a dorid nudibranch, a shell-less marine gastropod mollusk in the family Chromodorididae.

== Distribution ==
This marine species occurs off Australia and New Caledonia.
