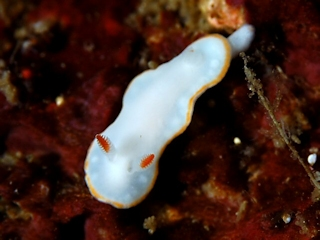

Scientific classification
- Kingdom: Animalia
- Phylum: Mollusca
- Class: Gastropoda
- Order: Nudibranchia
- Family: Chromodorididae
- Genus: Verconia
- Species: V. nivalis

Binomial name
- Verconia nivalis Baba, 1937

Synonyms
- Noumea nivalis Baba, 1937

= Verconia nivalis =

Species of gastropod

Verconia nivalis is a species of a dorid nudibranch (a colourful sea slug). It is a shell-less marine gastropod mollusk in the family Chromodorididae.

== Distribution ==
Specimens are known to inhabit the waters around Sado Island, located in the East Sea off the coast of Japan.
