= Verconia aureopunctata =

Scientific classification
- Kingdom: Animalia
- Phylum: Mollusca
- Class: Gastropoda
- Order: Nudibranchia
- Family: Chromodorididae
- Genus: Verconia
- Species: V. aureopunctata

Binomial name
- Verconia aureopunctata William B. Rudman, 1987

Synonyms
- Noumea aureopunctata Rudman, 1987

Species of gastropod

Verconia aureopunctata is a species of colourful sea slug, a dorid nudibranch, a shell-less marine gastropod mollusk in the family Chromodorididae.

== Distribution ==
This marine species is endemic to Australia and occurs off Tasmania and Victoria.
