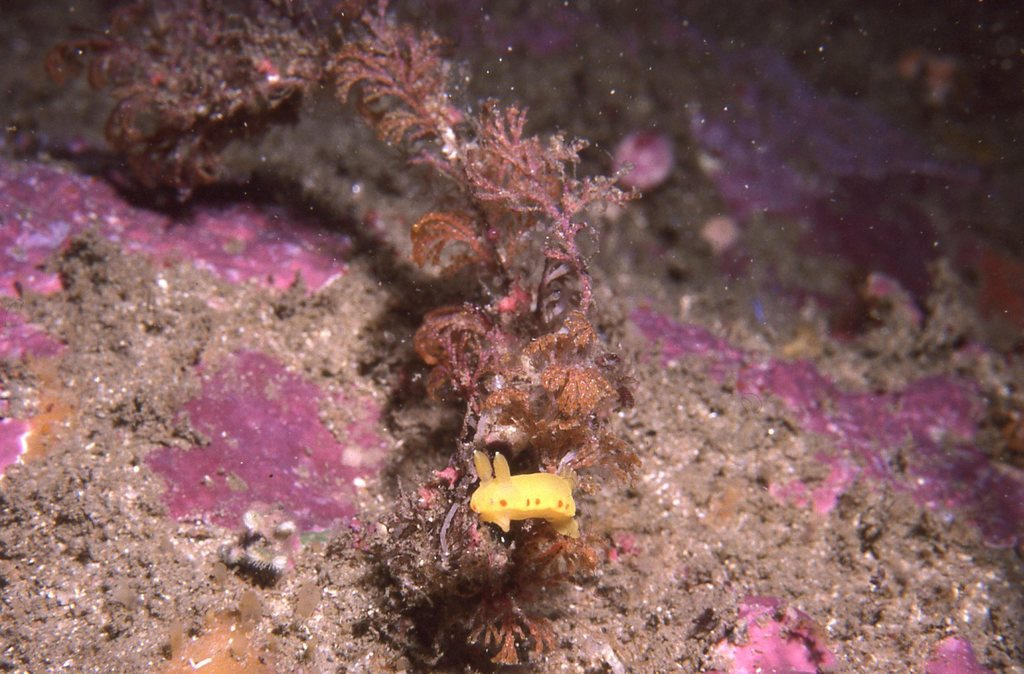

Scientific classification
- Kingdom: Animalia
- Phylum: Mollusca
- Class: Gastropoda
- Order: Nudibranchia
- Family: Chromodorididae
- Genus: Diversidoris
- Species: D. sulphurea

Binomial name
- Diversidoris sulphurea (Rudman, 1986)

Synonyms
- Noumea sulphurea Rudman, 1986 (basionym)

= Diversidoris sulphurea =

Species of gastropod

Diversidoris sulphurea is a species of colourful sea slug, a dorid nudibranch, a shell-less marine gastropod mollusk in the family Chromodorididae.

== Distribution ==
This marine species is endemic to warm temperate Australia and occurs off New South Wales, South Australia, Tasmania, Victoria and Western Australia.

== Description ==
This species comes in two colour forms, one from subtropical eastern Australia and one from warm temperate eastern and southern Australia. In New South Wales animals the whole of the body is a uniform bright yellow with regular orange spots around the mantle edge, sometimes touching the edge but usually just submarginal. Specimens from Tasmania, Victoria and South Australia differ from New South Wales animals in having regularly spaced white specks all over the mantle except for a clear band near the edge and the orange spots being more diffuse.

== Ecology ==
In New South Wales and Tasmania this species is always found on yellow species of the sponge genus Darwinella identical in colour to the nudibranch.
