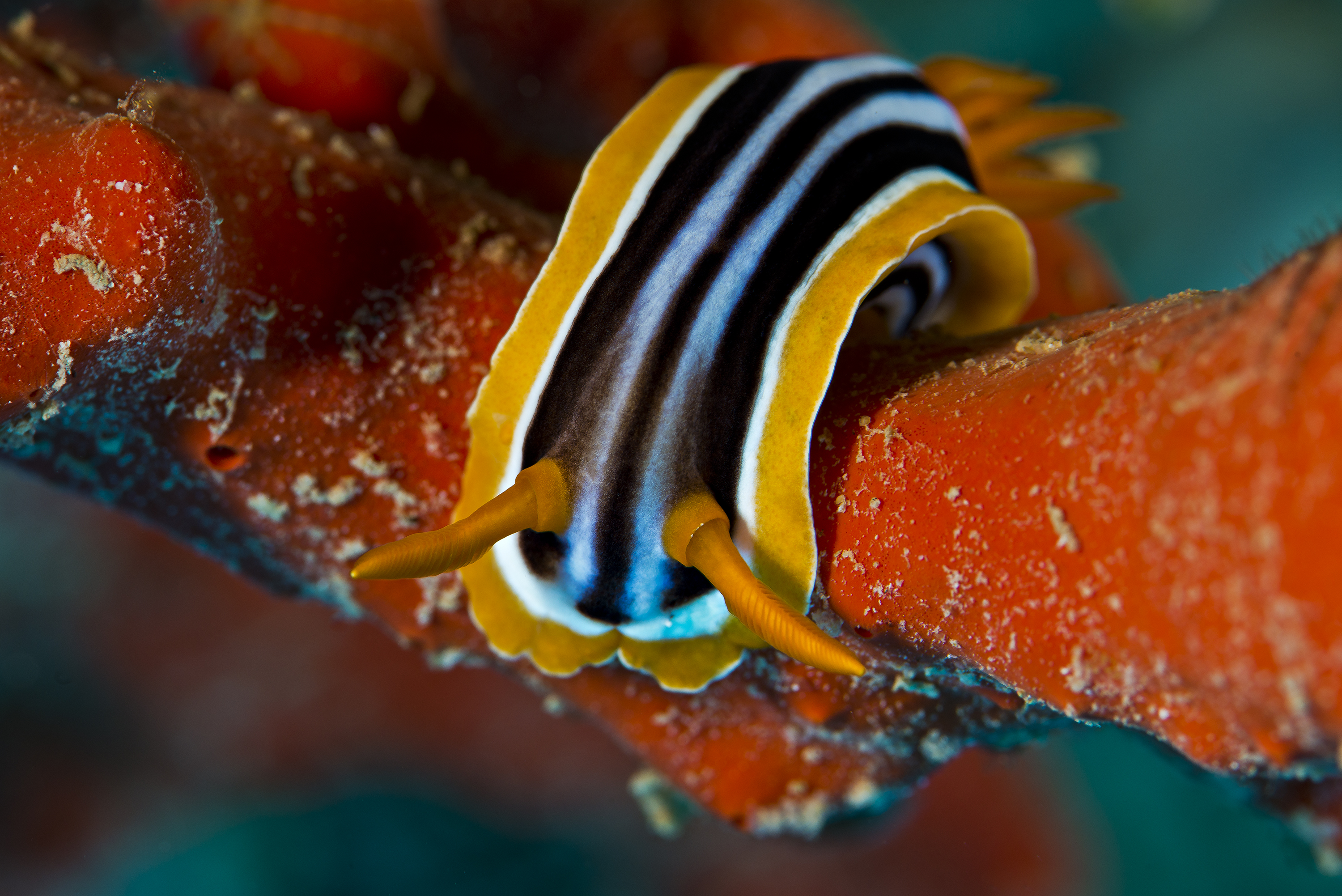

Scientific classification
- Kingdom: Animalia
- Phylum: Mollusca
- Class: Gastropoda
- Order: Nudibranchia
- Family: Chromodorididae
- Genus: Chromodoris
- Species: C. quadricolor

Binomial name
- Chromodoris quadricolor (Rüppell & Leuckart, 1828)

Synonyms
- Chromodoris quadricolor quadricolor (Rüppell & Leuckart, 1830); Doris quadricolor Rüppell & Leuckart, 1830 (original combination); Glossodoris quadricolor (Rüppell & Leuckart, 1828)

= Chromodoris quadricolor =

Species of gastropod

Chromodoris quadricolor is a species of very colourful sea slug also known as pyjama slug, a dorid nudibranch, a marine opisthobranch gastropod mollusc. The specific epithet quadricolor means four-coloured, so-named because this nudibranch is yellow, white, blue and black in color.

== Distribution ==
This dorid nudibranch was described from the Red Sea where it is one of the most common nudibranchs. It has been reported from other localities in the Western Indian Ocean.

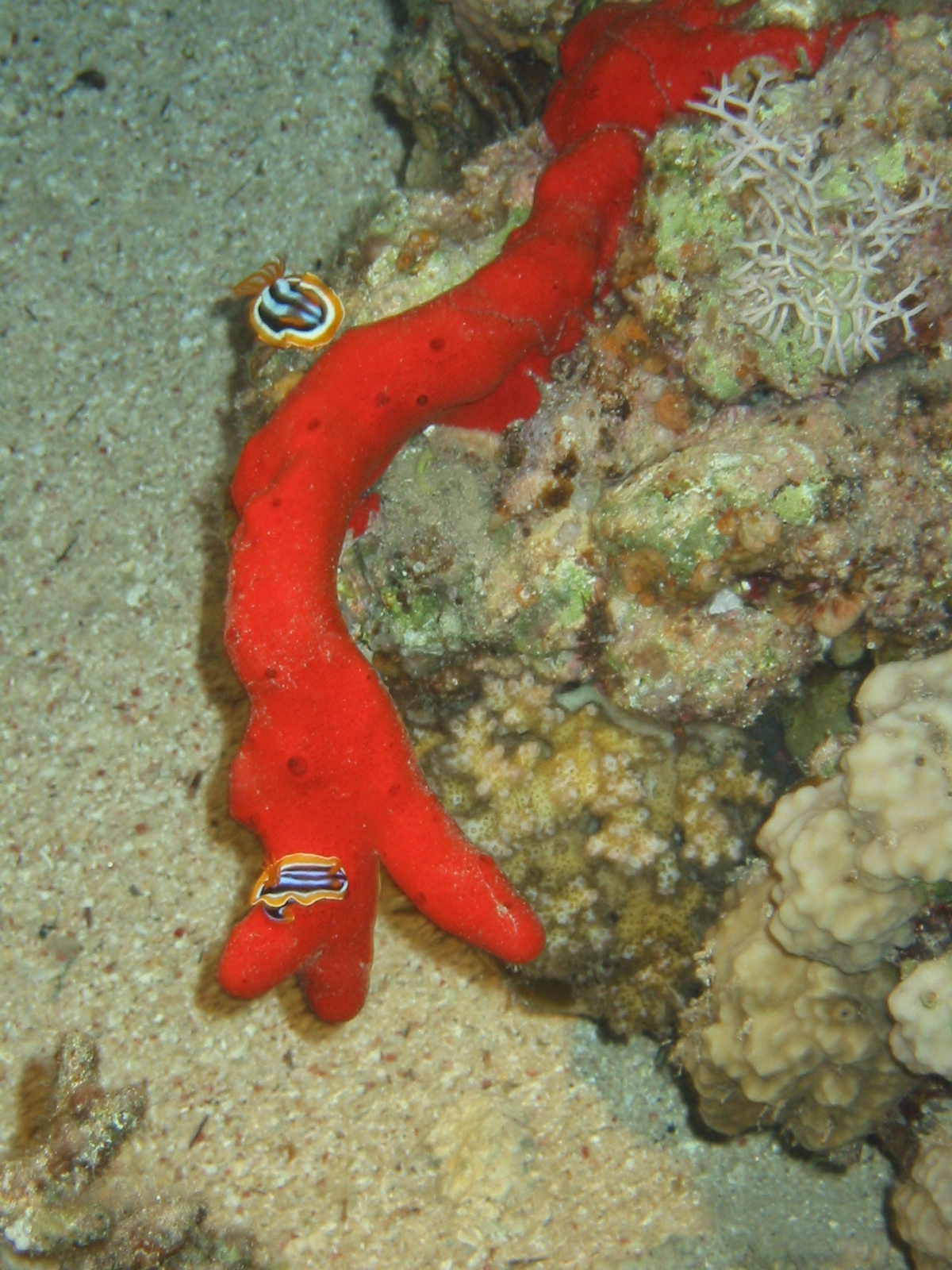
Two individuals on a red sponge (possibly the food species), photographed at night off of Dahab, Egypt, in the Red Sea.

== Ecology ==
This species feeds on the red sponge Negombata magnifica (Keller, 1889).
