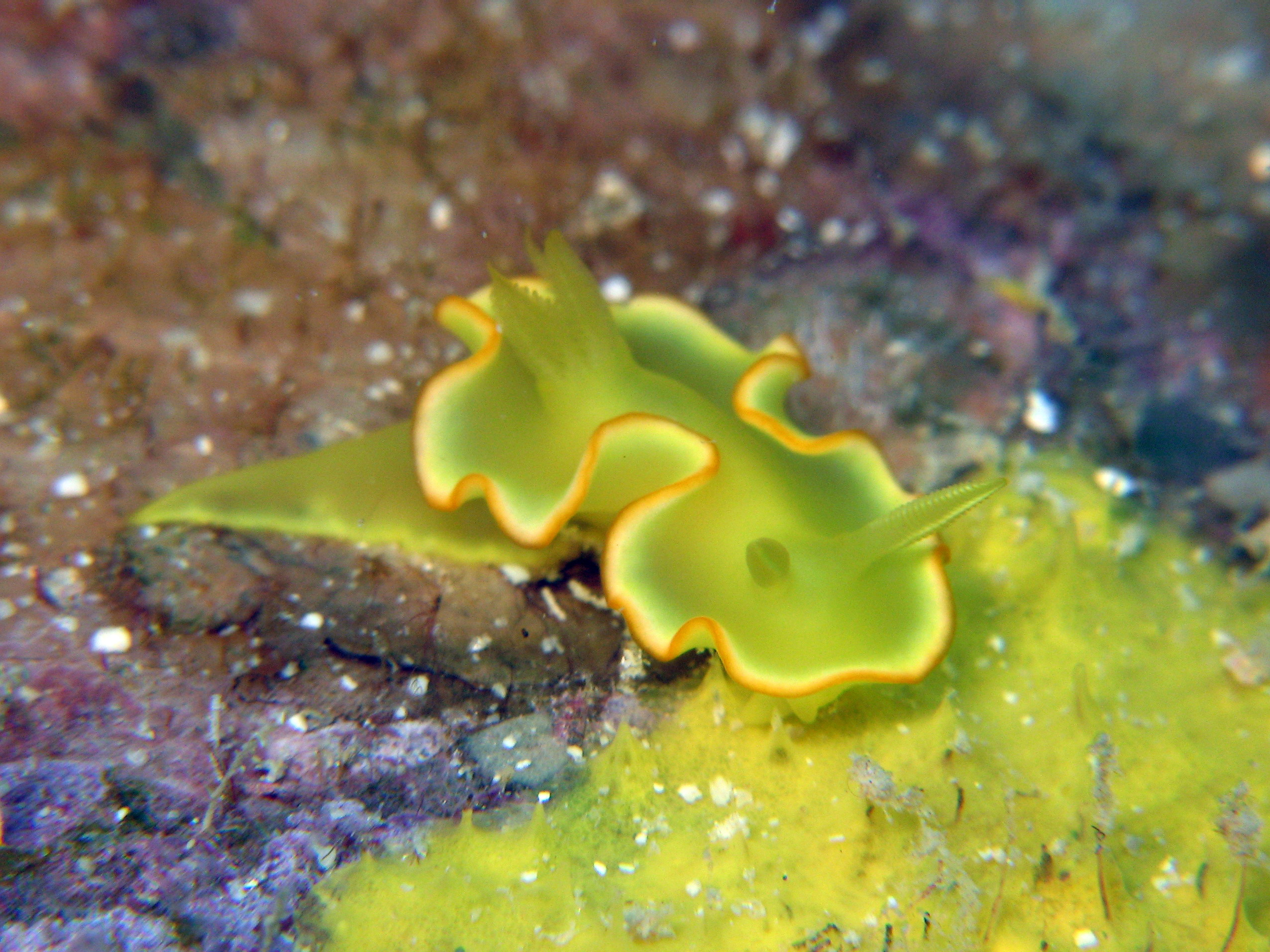
- A live individual of Diversidoris crocea in Guam, head end towards the right

Scientific classification
- Kingdom: Animalia
- Phylum: Mollusca
- Class: Gastropoda
- Order: Nudibranchia
- Family: Chromodorididae
- Genus: Diversidoris
- Species: D. crocea

Binomial name
- Diversidoris crocea (Rudman, 1986)

Synonyms
- Noumea crocea Rudman, 1986 (basionym)

= Diversidoris crocea =

Species of gastropod

Diversidoris crocea is a species of colourful sea slug, a dorid nudibranch, a shell-less marine gastropod mollusk in the family Chromodorididae.

== Distribution ==
This species is found in the tropical western Pacific, including: Indonesia, Philippines, Solomon Islands, Guam, and south to Queensland, Australia.

== Description ==
This nudibranch is usually less than 50 mm (2.0 in) in length. It has a yellow body with a pale mantle margin that has two semi-permanent mantle folds about mid-body. The rhinophores and branchia (gills) are also yellow. However, identifying individual yellow sea slugs within the genus Diversidoris can be challenging because yellow forms which mimic their food, yellow sponges, exist in many related species.

== Ecology ==
This species is often found on the yellow sponge Darwinella, which appears to be its preferred food source.
