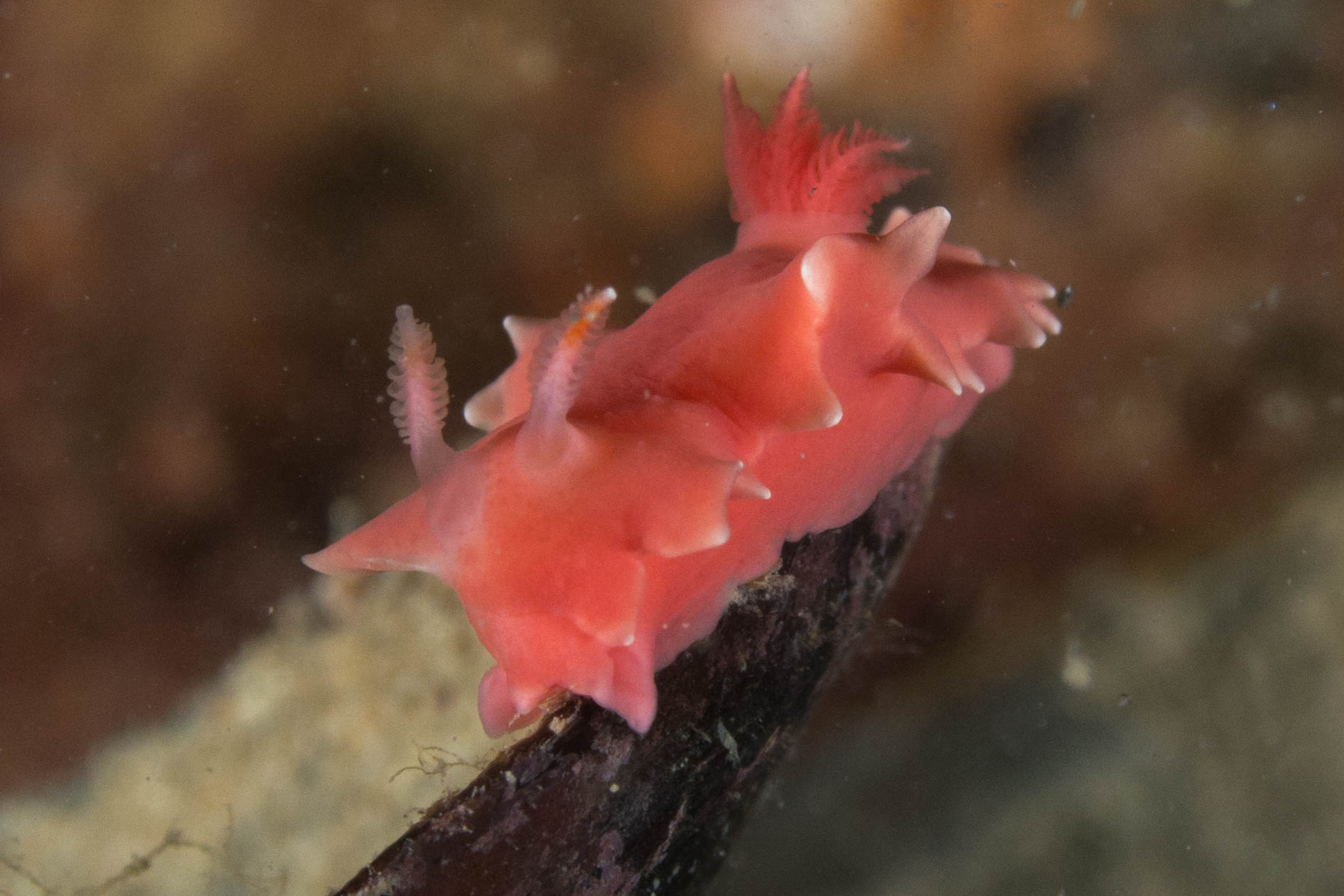

Scientific classification
- Kingdom: Animalia
- Phylum: Mollusca
- Class: Gastropoda
- Order: Nudibranchia
- Family: Chromodorididae
- Genus: Verconia
- Species: V. verconis

Binomial name
- Verconia verconis (Basedow & Hedley, 1905)

Synonyms
- Albania verconis Basedow & Hedley, 1905 (original combination); Noumea verconis (Basedow & Hedley, 1905)

= Verconia verconis =

Species of gastropod

Verconia verconis is a species of sea slug or dorid nudibranch, a marine gastropod mollusk in the family Chromodorididae.

== Distribution ==
This marine species occurs off South Australia.

== Description ==
The holotype, after being duly presented in the original paper, has been lost or resides in an unknown repository. Until this species is collected again, it must remain an unknown quantity.
