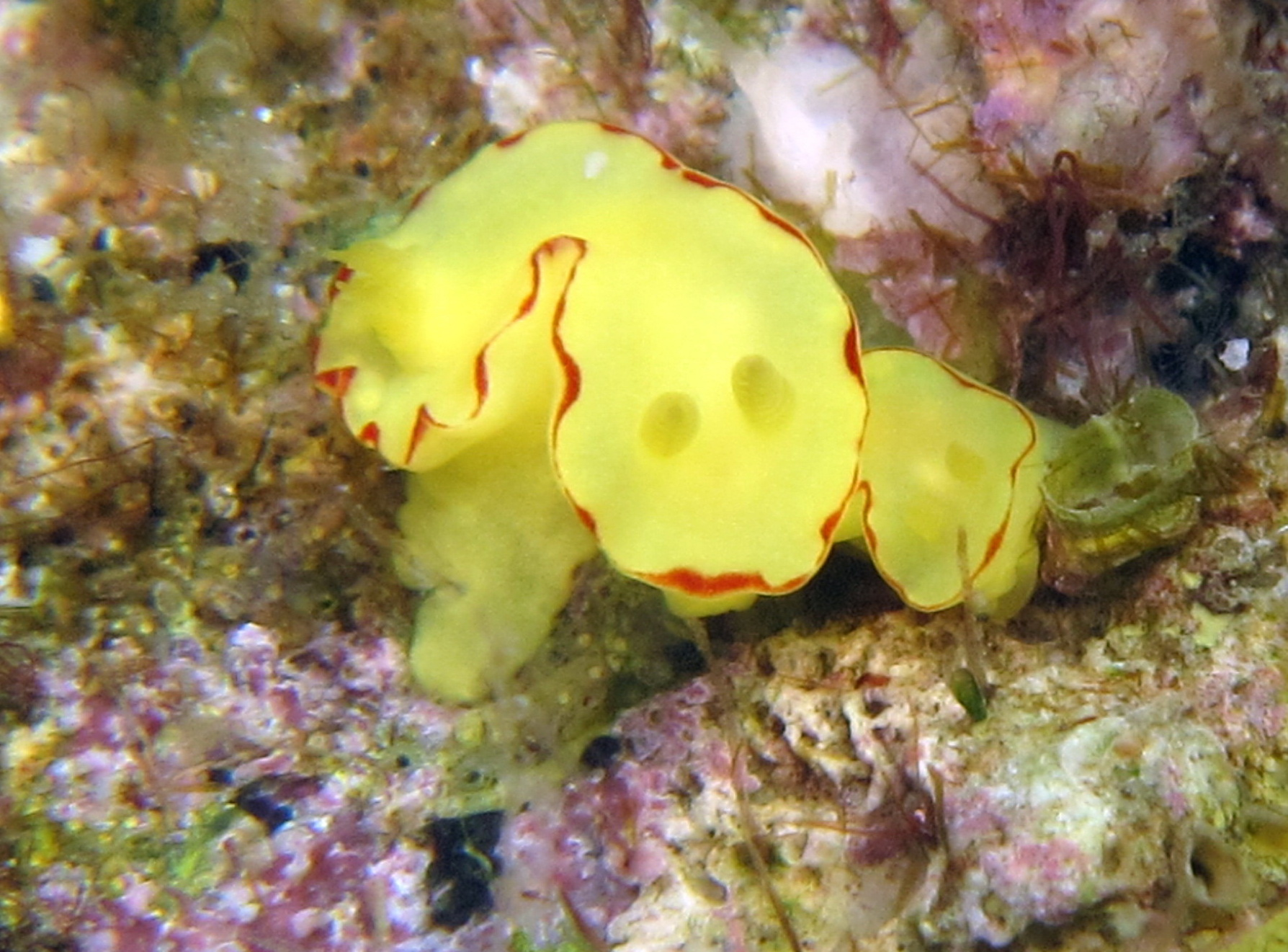
- A pair of Diversidoris flava, Philippines

Scientific classification
- Kingdom: Animalia
- Phylum: Mollusca
- Class: Gastropoda
- Order: Nudibranchia
- Family: Chromodorididae
- Genus: Diversidoris
- Species: D. flava

Binomial name
- Diversidoris flava (Eliot, 1904)

Synonyms
- Chromodoris flava Eliot, 1904 (original combination); Glossodoris flava (Eliot, 1904); Noumea flava (Eliot, 1904)

= Diversidoris flava =

Species of gastropod

Diversidoris flava is a yellow species of sea slug, a dorid nudibranch, a shell-less marine gastropod mollusk in the family Chromodorididae.

== Distribution ==
This nudibranch was originally described from East Africa, but it has an Indo-West Pacific distribution including Australia (Queensland) and Hawaii.

== Description ==
This species is usually less than 50 mm (2.0 in) in length. It has a yellow body with an identifying red mantle margin which has two semi-permanent mantle folds about mid-body. The rhinophores and branchia (gills) are yellow. Identifying individual yellow sea slugs within the genus Diversidoris can be challenging because yellow forms exist in several related species.

== Ecology ==
This species is often found on the yellow sponge Hyrtios, which appears to be its preferred food source.
