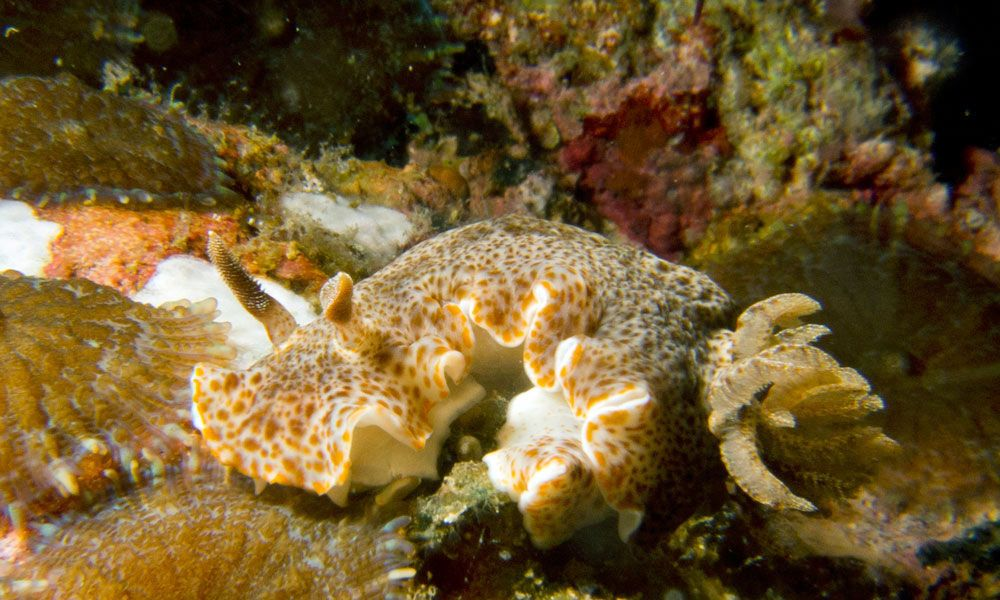
- A full-grown Chromodoris mandapamensis
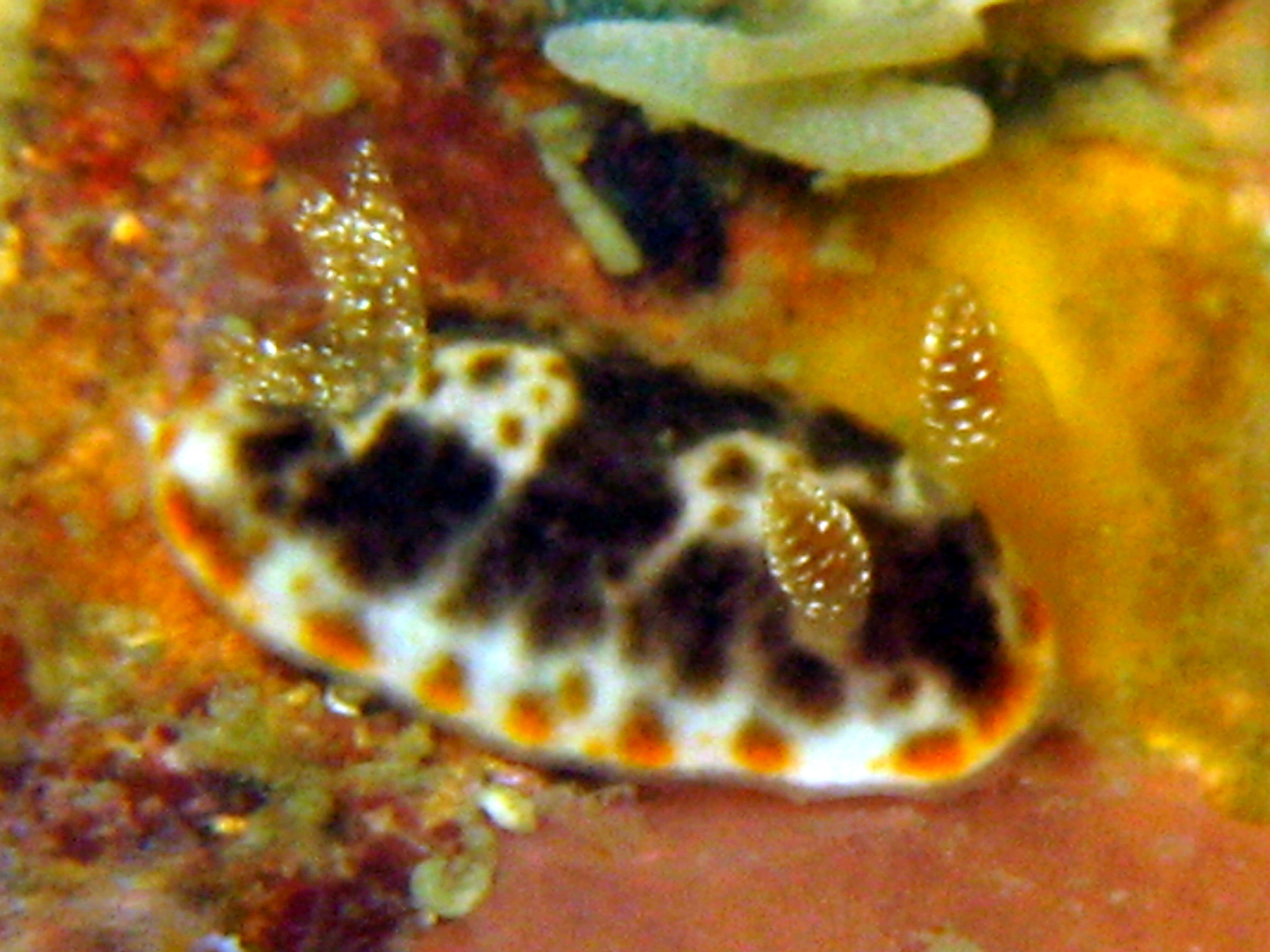
- A juvenile Chromodoris mandapamensis

Scientific classification
- Kingdom: Animalia
- Phylum: Mollusca
- Class: Gastropoda
- Order: Nudibranchia
- Family: Chromodorididae
- Genus: Chromodoris
- Species: C. mandapamensis

Binomial name
- Chromodoris mandapamensis (Valdés, Mollo, & Ortea, 1999)

Synonyms
- Goniobranchus mandapamensis Valdes, Mollo, & Ortea, 1999

= Chromodoris mandapamensis =

Species of gastropod

Chromodoris mandapamensis is a species of colourful sea slug, a dorid nudibranch, a marine gastropod mollusk in the family Chromodorididae.

== Distribution ==
This species was described from India.
