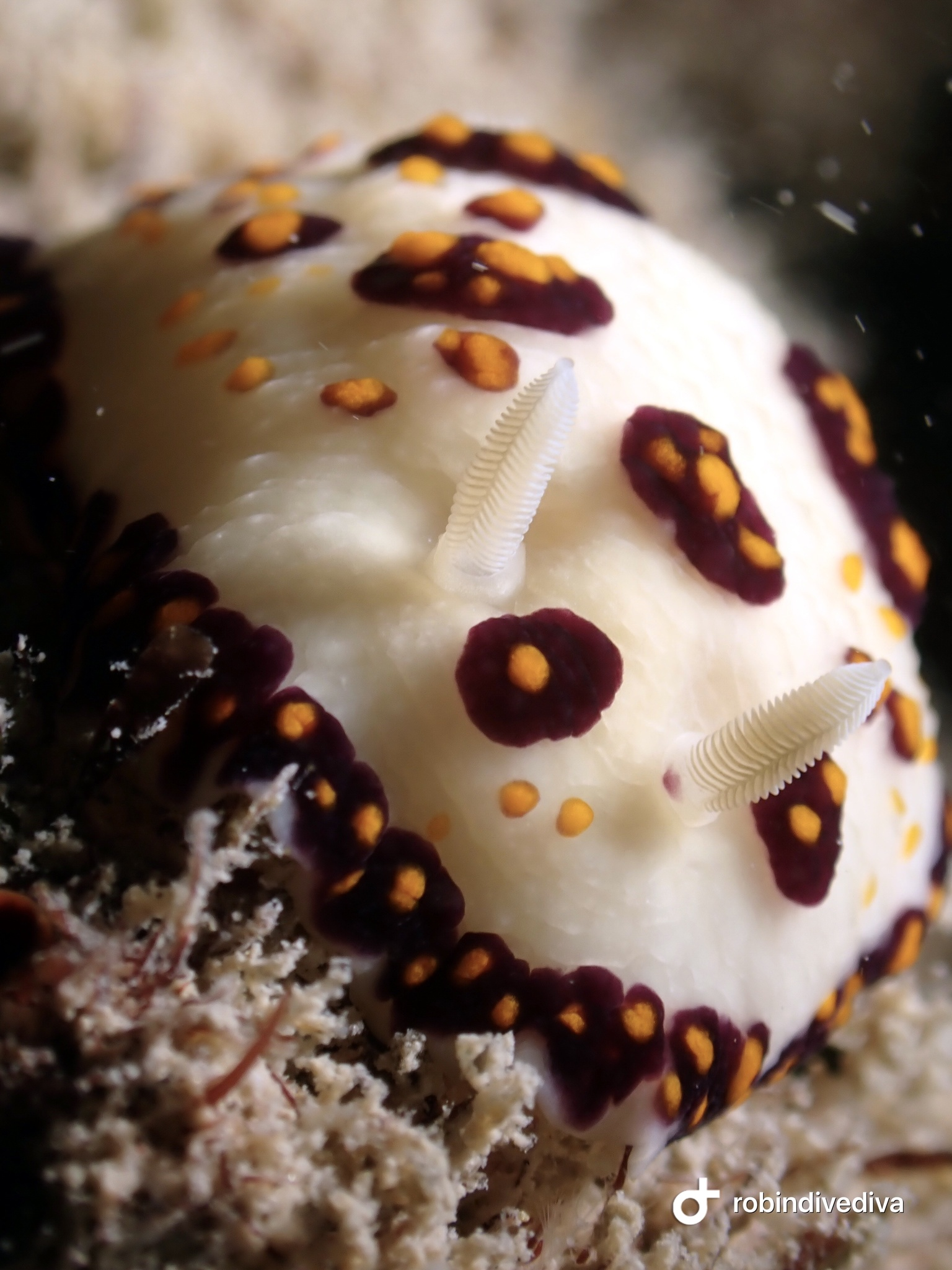

Scientific classification
- Kingdom: Animalia
- Phylum: Mollusca
- Class: Gastropoda
- Order: Nudibranchia
- Family: Chromodorididae
- Genus: Goniobranchus
- Species: G. cazae

Binomial name
- Goniobranchus cazae Gosliner & Behrens, 2004

Synonyms
- Chromodoris cazae Gosliner & Behrens, 2004 (basionym)

= Goniobranchus cazae =

Species of gastropod

Goniobranchus cazae is a species of colourful sea slug, a dorid nudibranch, a marine gastropod mollusc in the family Chromodorididae.

== Distribution ==
This species was described from Khawr Faddan, United Arab Emirates.

== Description ==
Goniobranchus cazae is a bright opaque white chromodorid nudibranch with irregular, well-defined, dark purple blotches on the mantle and a mantle margin of the same colour. There are raised yellow-orange spots in the purple patches. The gills and rhinophores are bright white.
