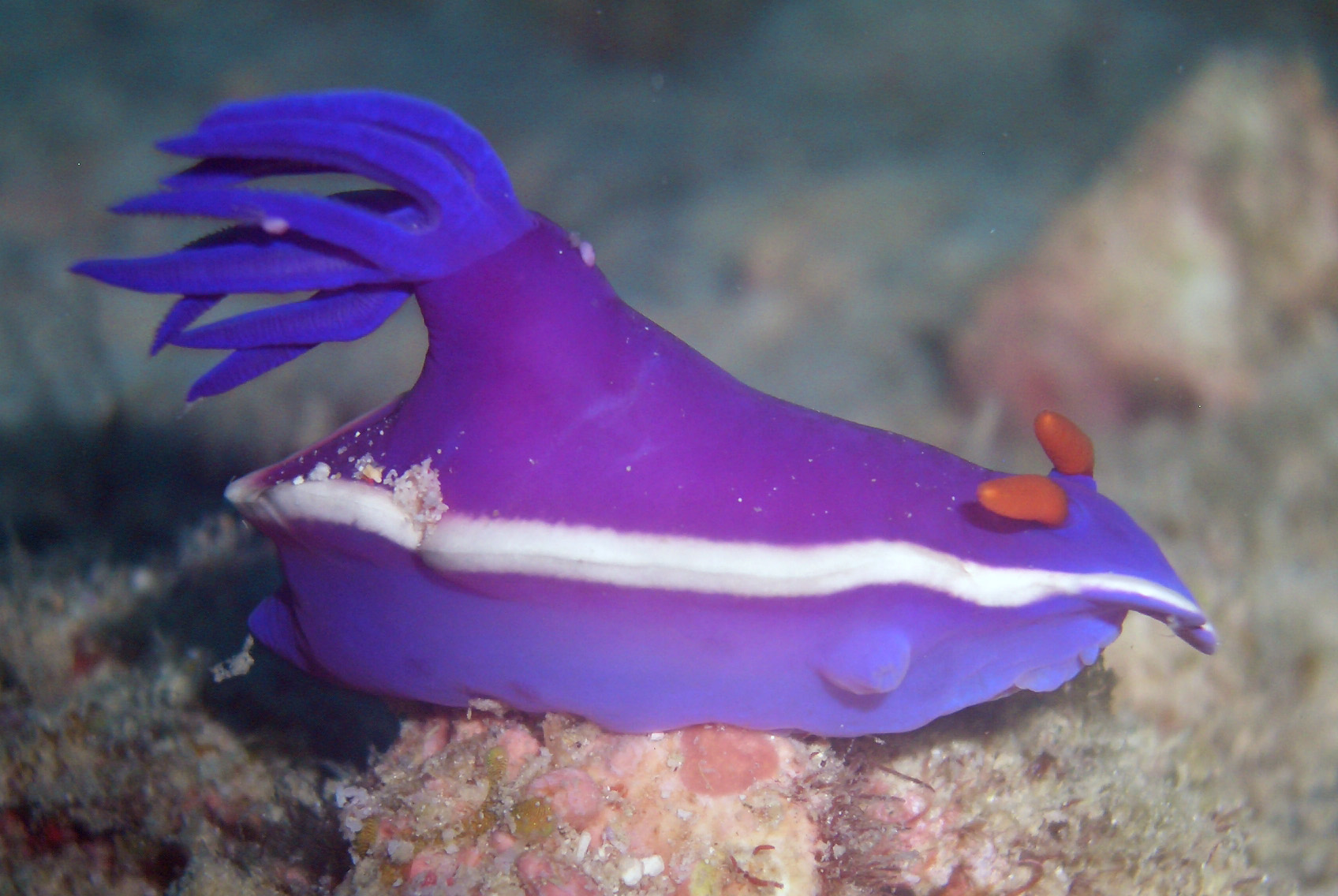
- Hypselodoris variobranchia in Sipidan, Borneo

Scientific classification
- Kingdom: Animalia
- Phylum: Mollusca
- Class: Gastropoda
- Order: Nudibranchia
- Family: Chromodorididae
- Genus: Hypselodoris; Stimpson, 1855

Type species
- Goniodoris obscura Stimpson, 1855

Species
- See text

Synonyms
- Brachychlanis Ehrenberg, 1831; Brachyclanis [sic] (misspelling); Jeanrisbecia Franc, 1968 (Unnecessary replacement name for Risbecia Odhner, 1934); Pterodoris Ehrenbegh, 1831; Risbecia Odhner, 1934

= Hypselodoris =

Genus of gastropods

Hypselodoris is a genus of colourful sea slugs or dorid nudibranchs, marine gastropod mollusks in the family Chromodorididae. Modern usage follows a more restricted view of which species belong in this genus so there are numerous genus transfers.

== Species ==
Species in the genus Hypselodoris include:

- Hypselodoris alboterminata Gosliner & Johnson, 1999
- Hypselodoris alburtuqali Gosliner & Johnson, 2018
- Hypselodoris apolegma (Yonow, 2001)
- Hypselodoris babai Gosliner & Behrens, 2000
- Hypselodoris bennetti (Angas, 1864)
- Hypselodoris bertschi Gosliner & Johnson, 1999
- Hypselodoris bollandi Gosliner & Johnson, 1999
- Hypselodoris brycei Gosliner & Johnson, 2018
- Hypselodoris bullockii (Collingwood, 1881)
- Hypselodoris capensis (Barnard, 1927) - Cape dorid
- Hypselodoris carnea (Bergh, 1889)
- Hypselodoris cerisae Gosliner & Johnson, 2018
- Hypselodoris confetti Gosliner & Johnson, 2018
- Hypselodoris decorata Risbec, 1928
- Hypselodoris dollfusi (Pruvot-Fol, 1933)
- Hypselodoris emma Rudman, 1977
- Hypselodoris festiva A. Adams, 1861
- Hypselodoris flavomarginata Rudman, 1995
- Hypselodoris fucata Gosliner & Johnson, 1999
- Hypselodoris ghardaqana (Gohar & Aboul-Ela, 1957)
- Hypselodoris godeffroyana (Bergh, 1877)
- Hypselodoris iacula Gosliner & Johnson, 1999
- Hypselodoris iba Gosliner & Johnson, 2018
- Hypselodoris imperialis (Pease, 1860)
- Hypselodoris infucata (Ruppell & Leuckart, 1828)
- Hypselodoris insulana Gosliner & Johnson, 1999
- Hypselodoris jacksoni Wilson & Willan, 2007
- Hypselodoris juniperae Gosliner & Johnson, 2018
- Hypselodoris kaname Baba, 1994
- Hypselodoris kanga Rudman, 1977
- Hypselodoris katherinae Gosliner & Johnson, 2018
- Hypselodoris krakatoa Gosliner & Johnson, 1999
- Hypselodoris lacteola Rudman, 1995
- Hypselodoris lacuna Gosliner & Johnson, 2018
- Hypselodoris maculosa (Pease, 1871)
- Hypselodoris maridadilus Rudman, 1977
- Hypselodoris maritima (Baba, 1949)
- Hypselodoris melanesica Gosliner & Johnson, 2018
- Hypselodoris nigrolineata (Eliot, 1904)
- Hypselodoris nigrostriata (Eliot, 1904)
- Hypselodoris obscura Stimpson, 1855
- Hypselodoris paradisa Gosliner & Johnson, 2018
- Hypselodoris paulinae Gosliner & Johnson, 1999
- Hypselodoris peasei (Bergh, 1860)
- Hypselodoris perii Gosliner & Johnson, 2018
- Hypselodoris placida (Baba, 1949)
- Hypselodoris pulchella (Rüppell & Leuckart, 1828)
- Hypselodoris purpureomaculosa Hamatani, 1995
- Hypselodoris regina Marcus & Marcus, 1970
- Hypselodoris reidi Gosliner & Johnson, 1999
- Hypselodoris roo Gosliner & Johnson, 2018
- Hypselodoris rosans (Bergh, 1889)
- Hypselodoris rositoi Gosliner & Johnson, 2018
- Hypselodoris rudmani Gosliner & Johnson, 1999
- Hypselodoris sagamiensis (Baba, 1949)
- Hypselodoris saintvincentius Burn, 1962
- Hypselodoris shimodaensis Baba, 1994
- Hypselodoris skyleri Gosliner & Johnson, 2018
- Hypselodoris tryoni (Garrett, 1873)
- Hypselodoris variobranchia Gosliner & Johnson, 2018
- Hypselodoris violabranchia Gosliner & Johnson, 1999
- Hypselodoris violacea Gosliner & Johnson, 2018
- Hypselodoris whitei (Adams & Reeve, 1850)
- Hypselodoris yarae Gosliner & Johnson, 2018
- Hypselodoris zebrina (Alder & Hancock, 1864)
- Hypselodoris zephyra Gosliner & Johnson, 1999
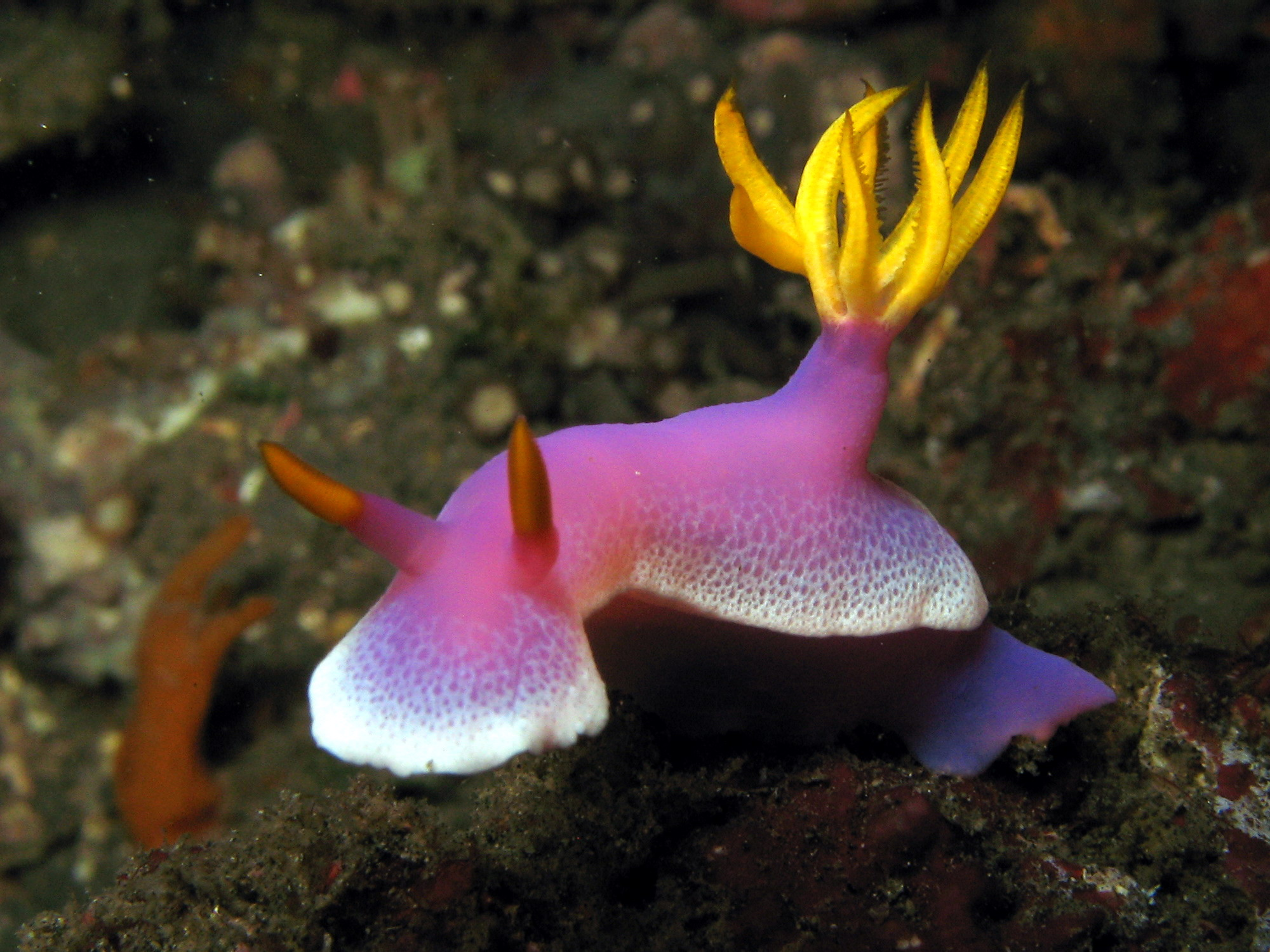
Hypselodoris apolegma

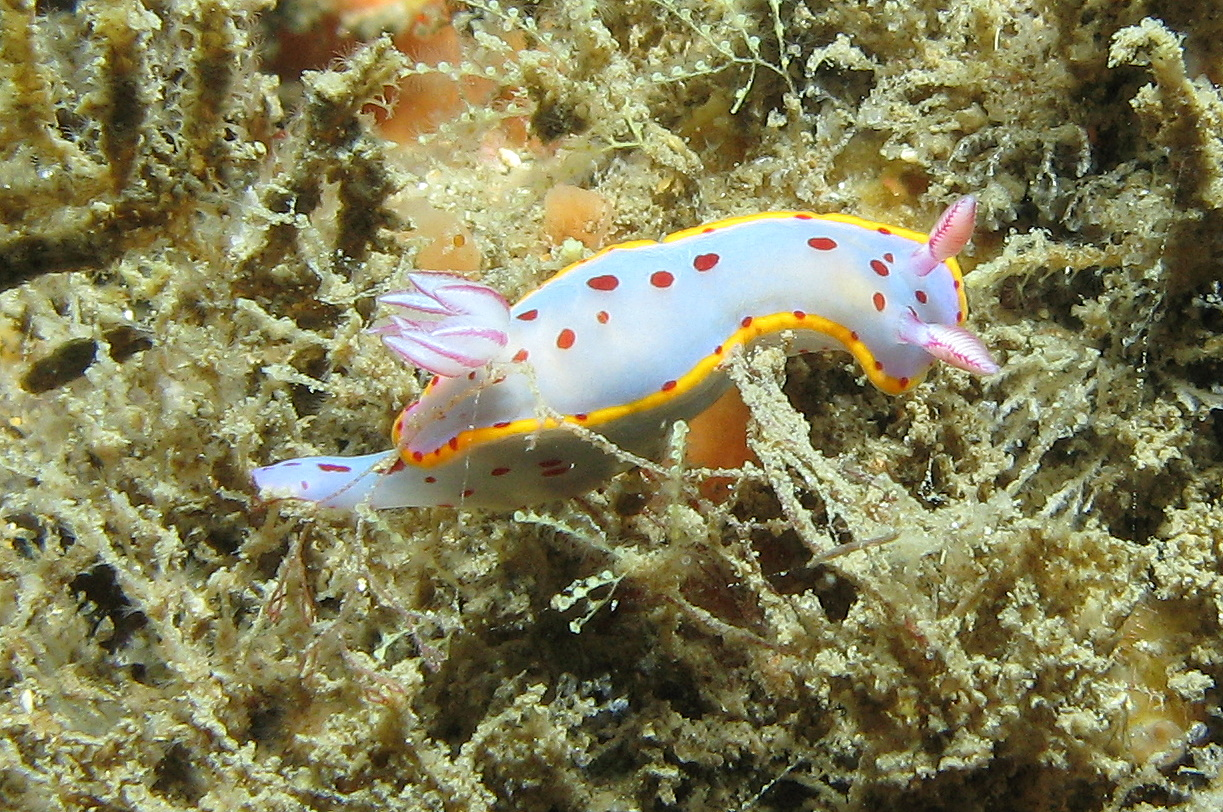
Hypselodoris bennetti

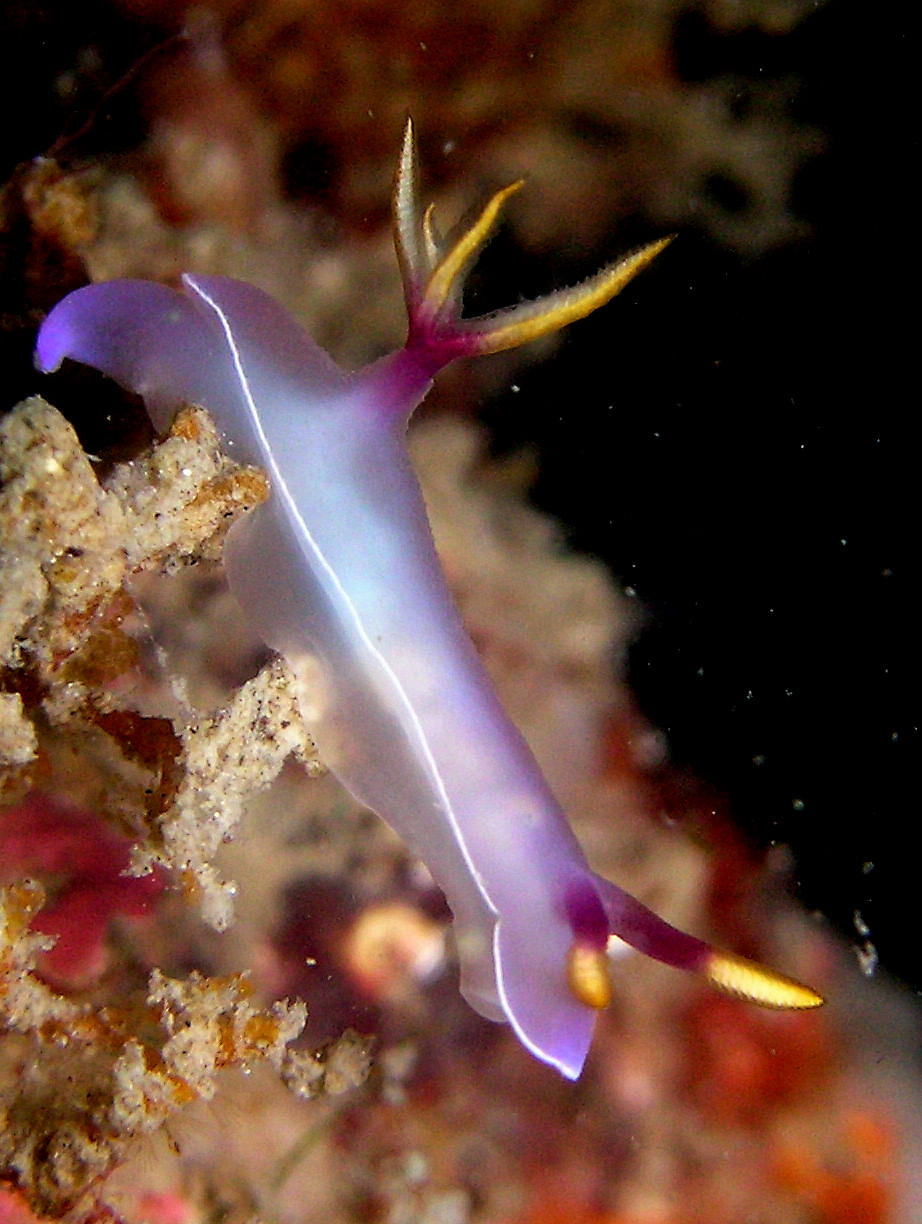
Hypselodoris bullocki

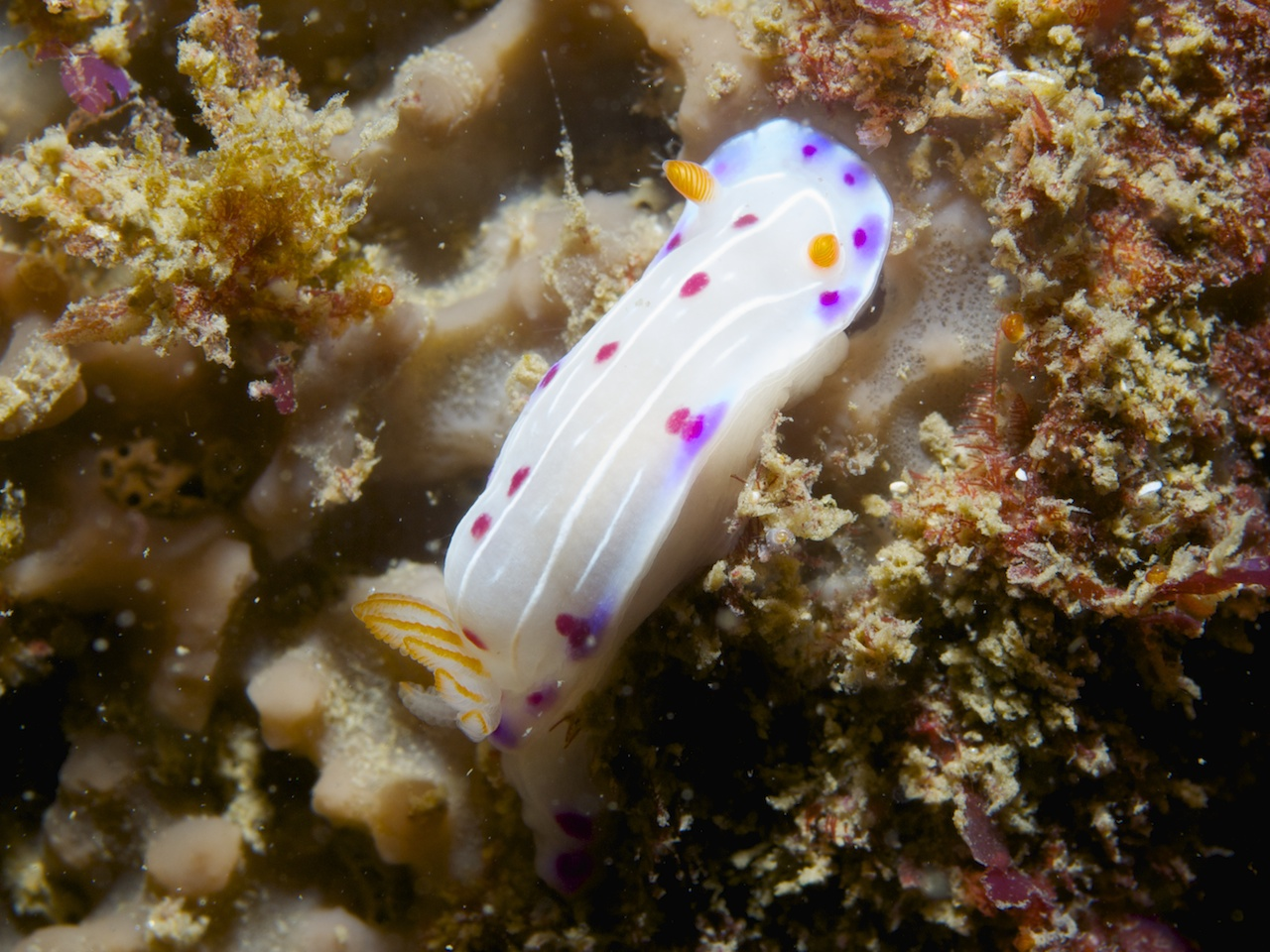
Hypselodoris capensis

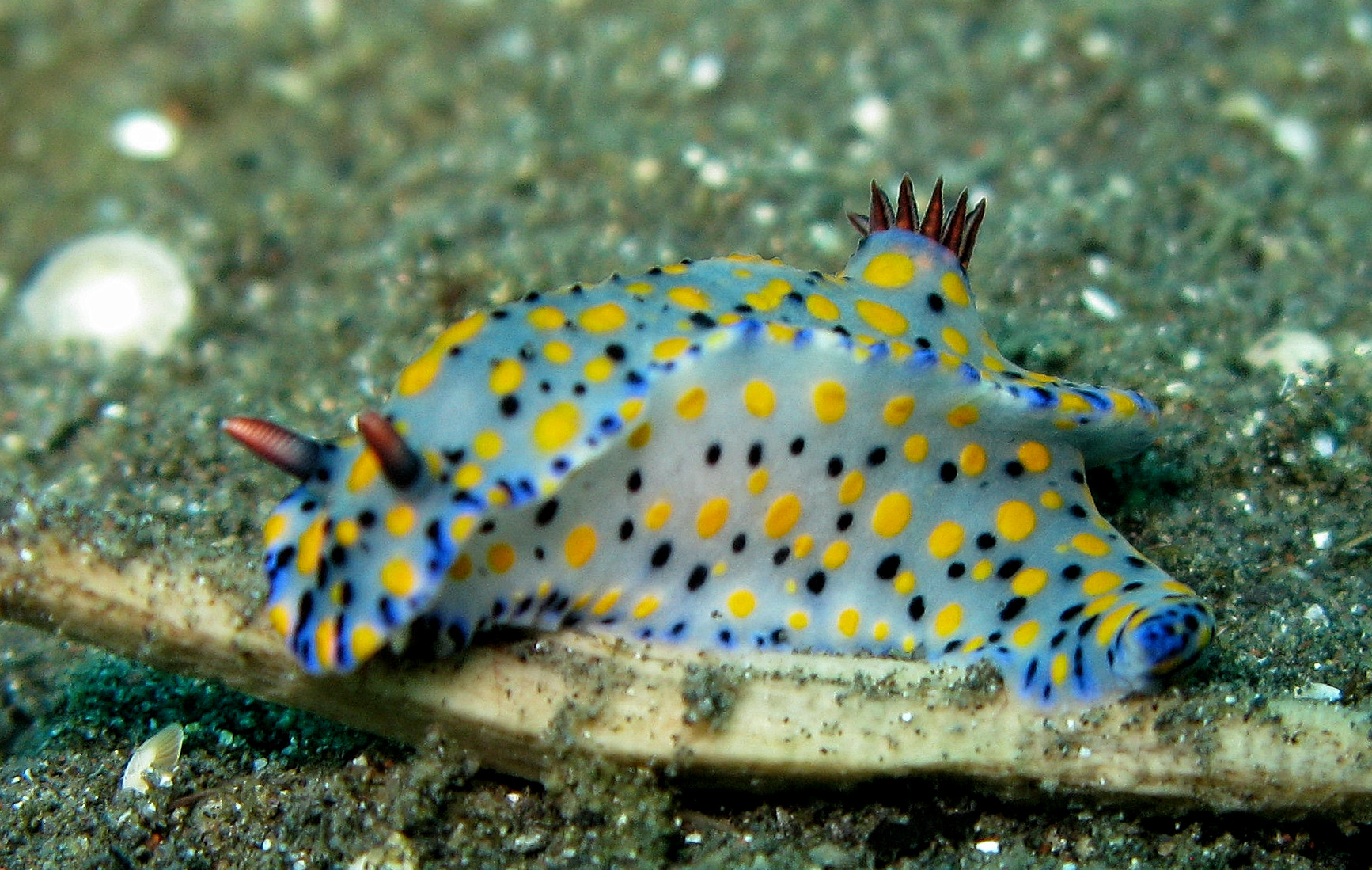
Hypselodoris confetti

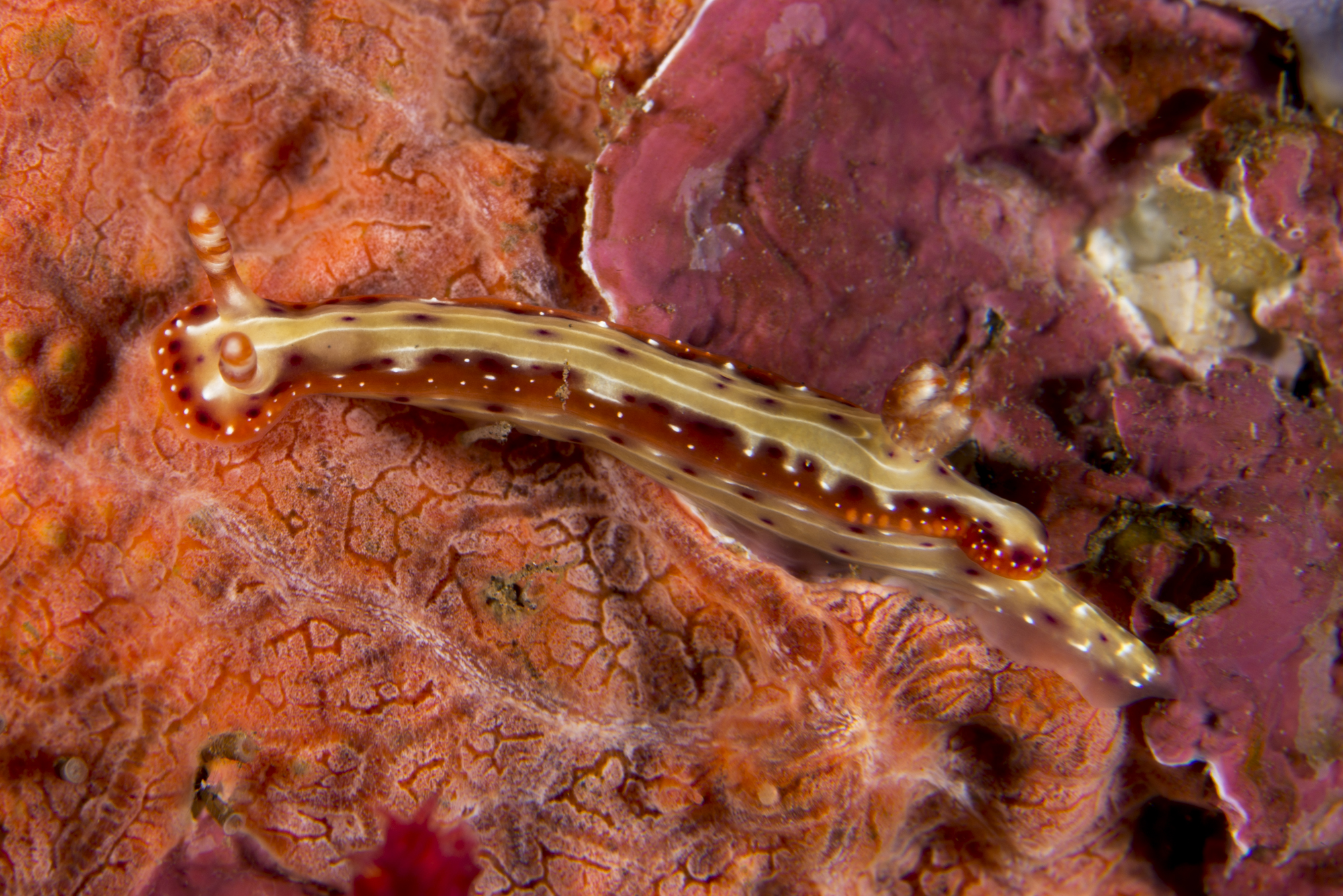
Hypselodoris decorata

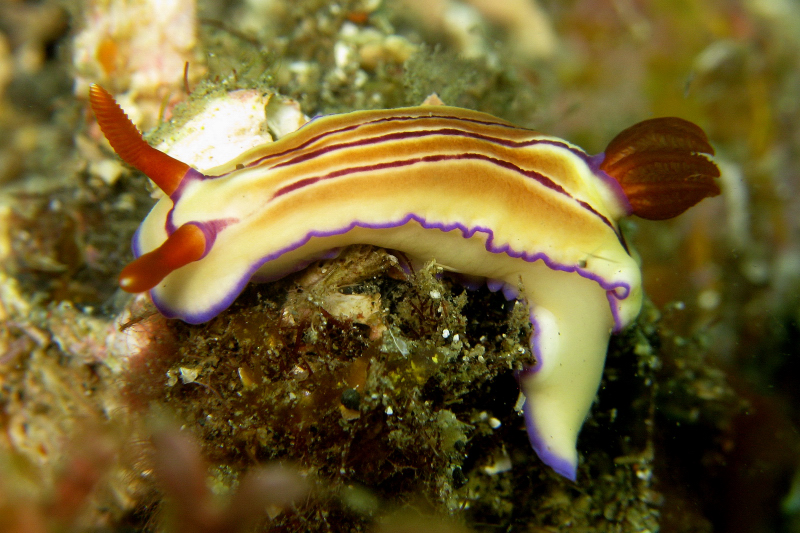
Hypselodoris emma

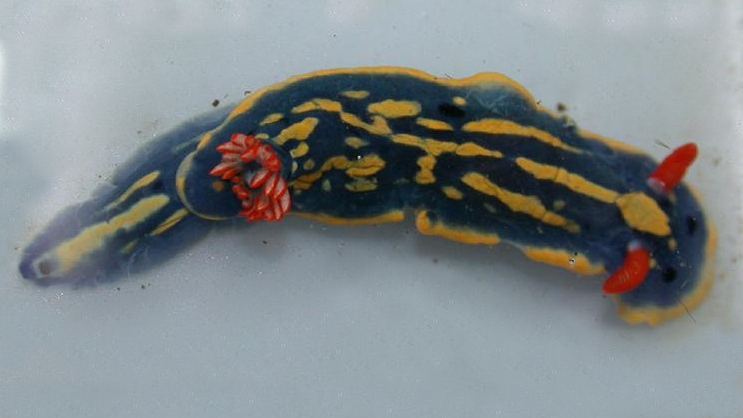
Hypselodoris festiva

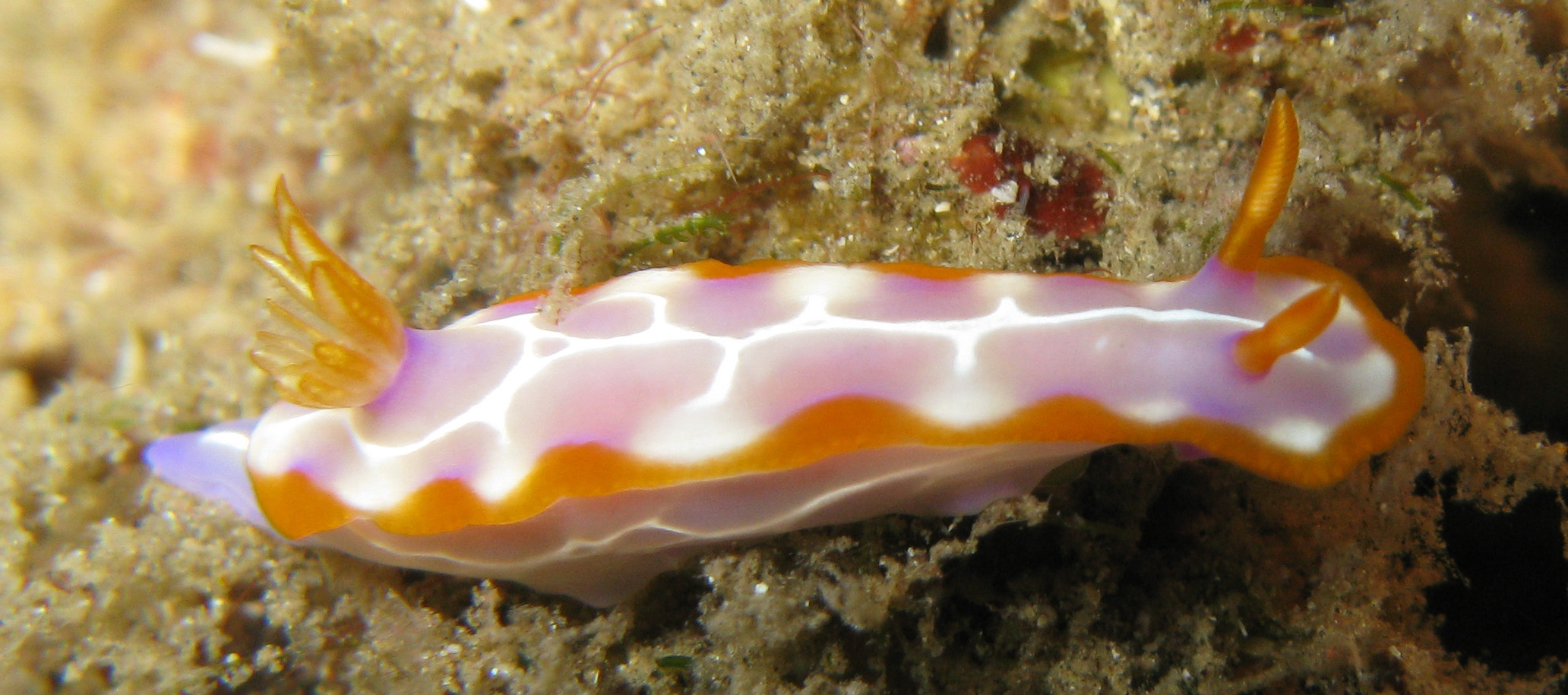
Hypselodoris iacula

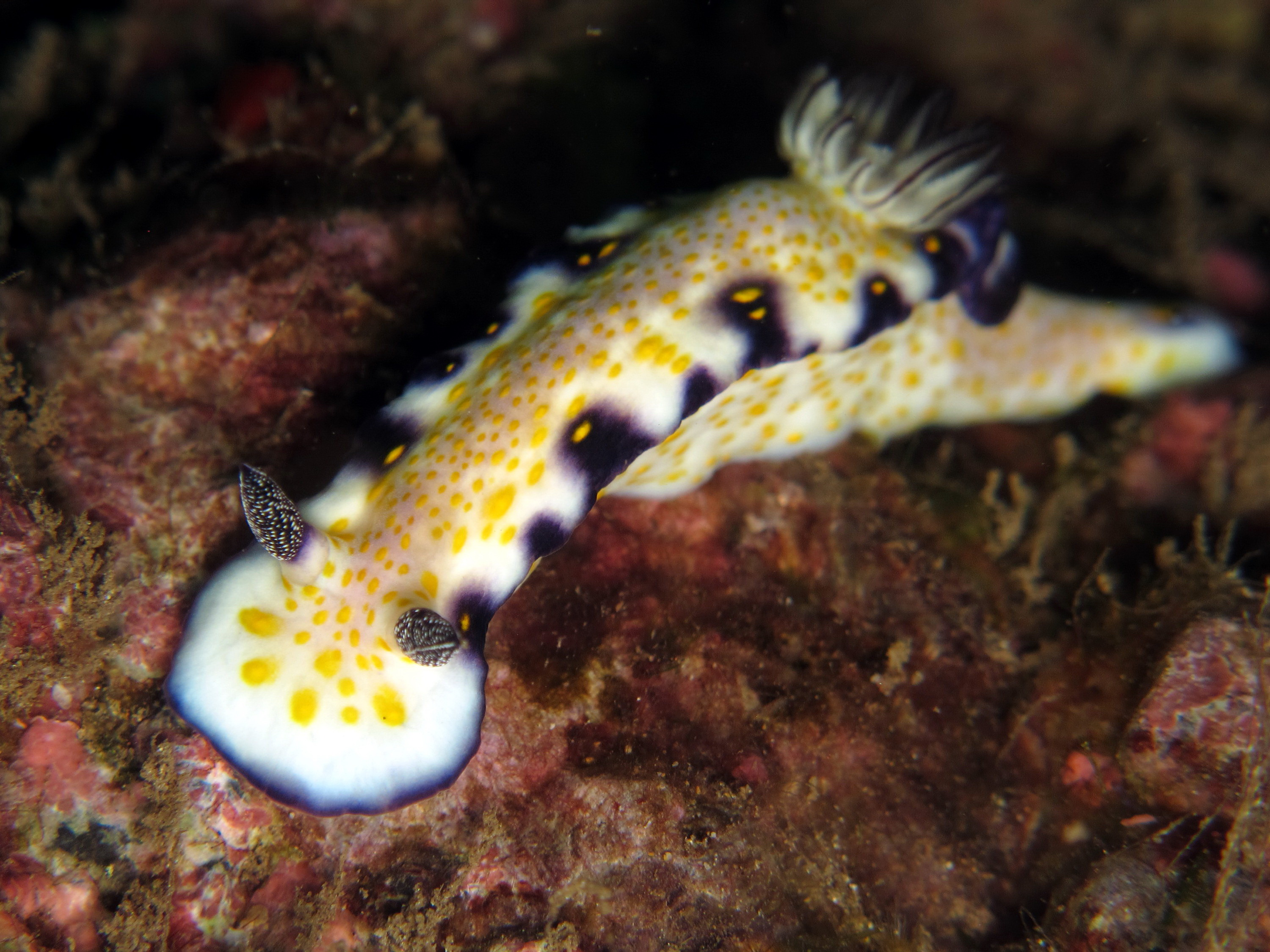
Hypselodoris imperialis

Hypselodoris infucata

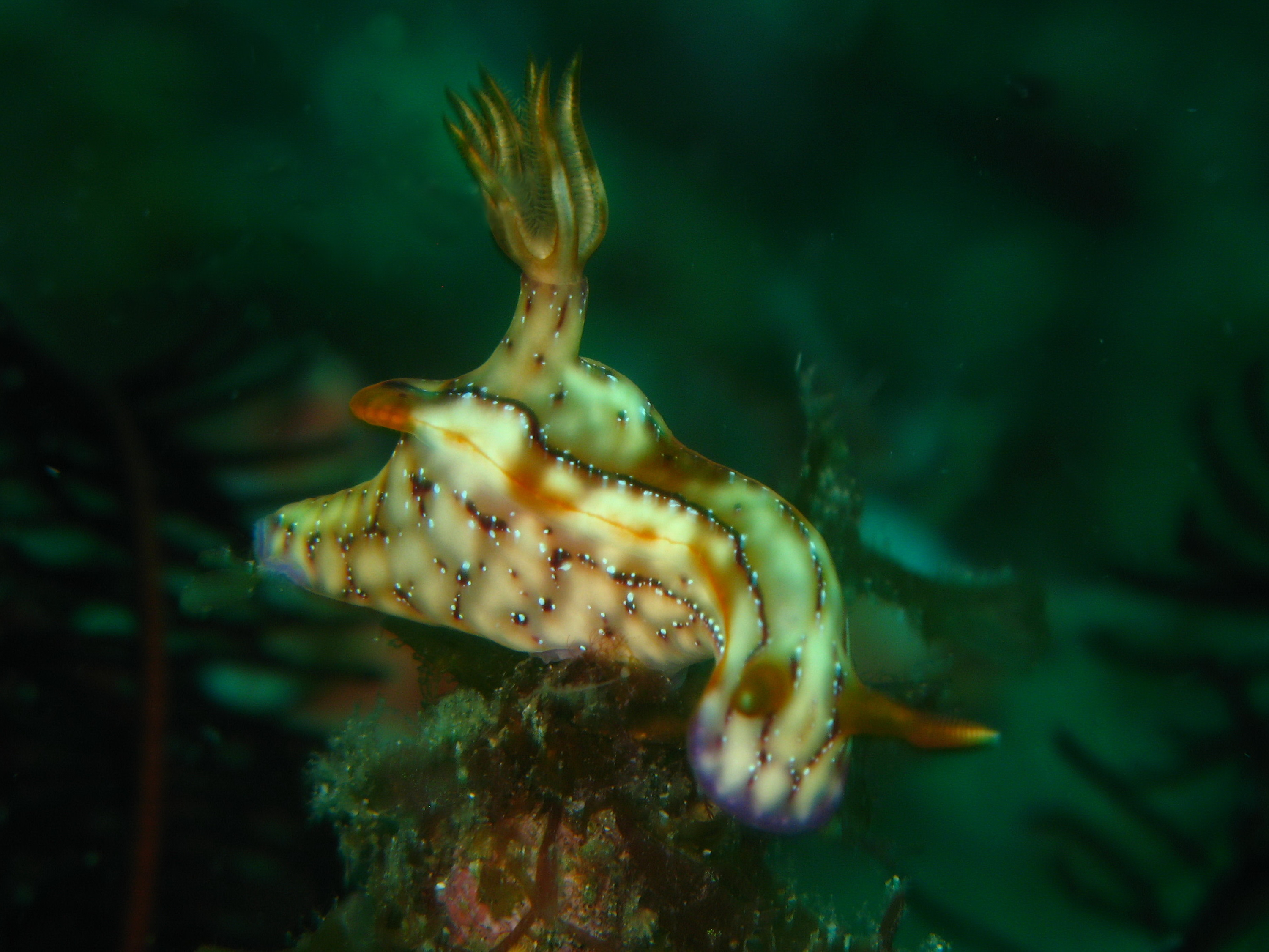
Hypselodoris krakatoa

Hypselodoris maritima

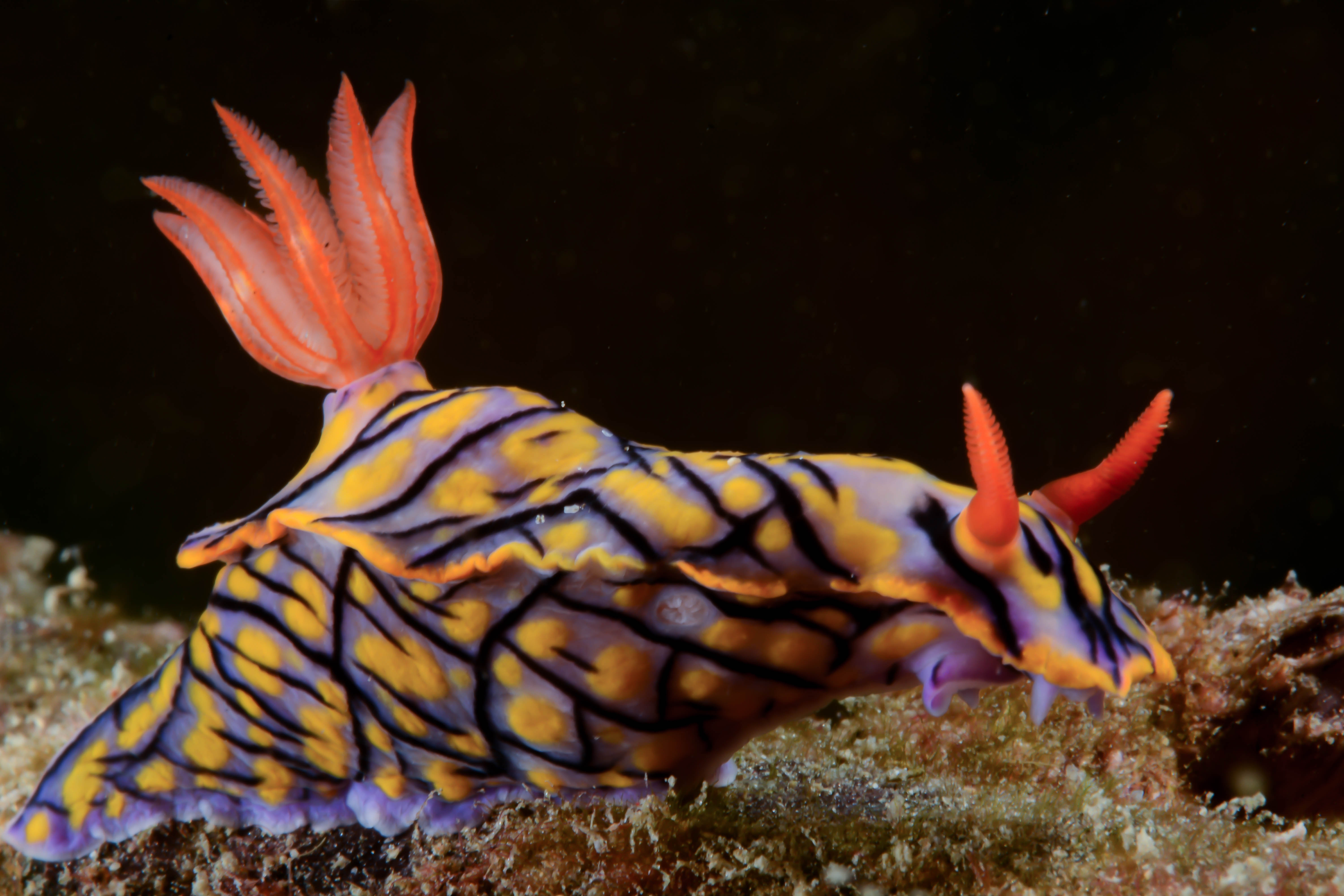
Hypselodoris nigrostriata

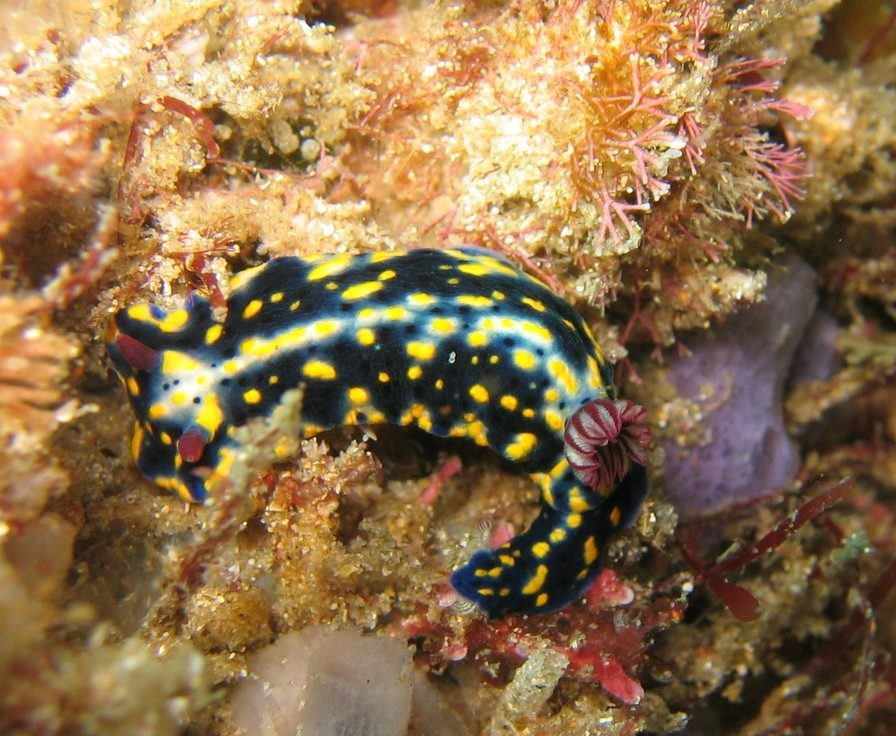
Hypselodoris obscura

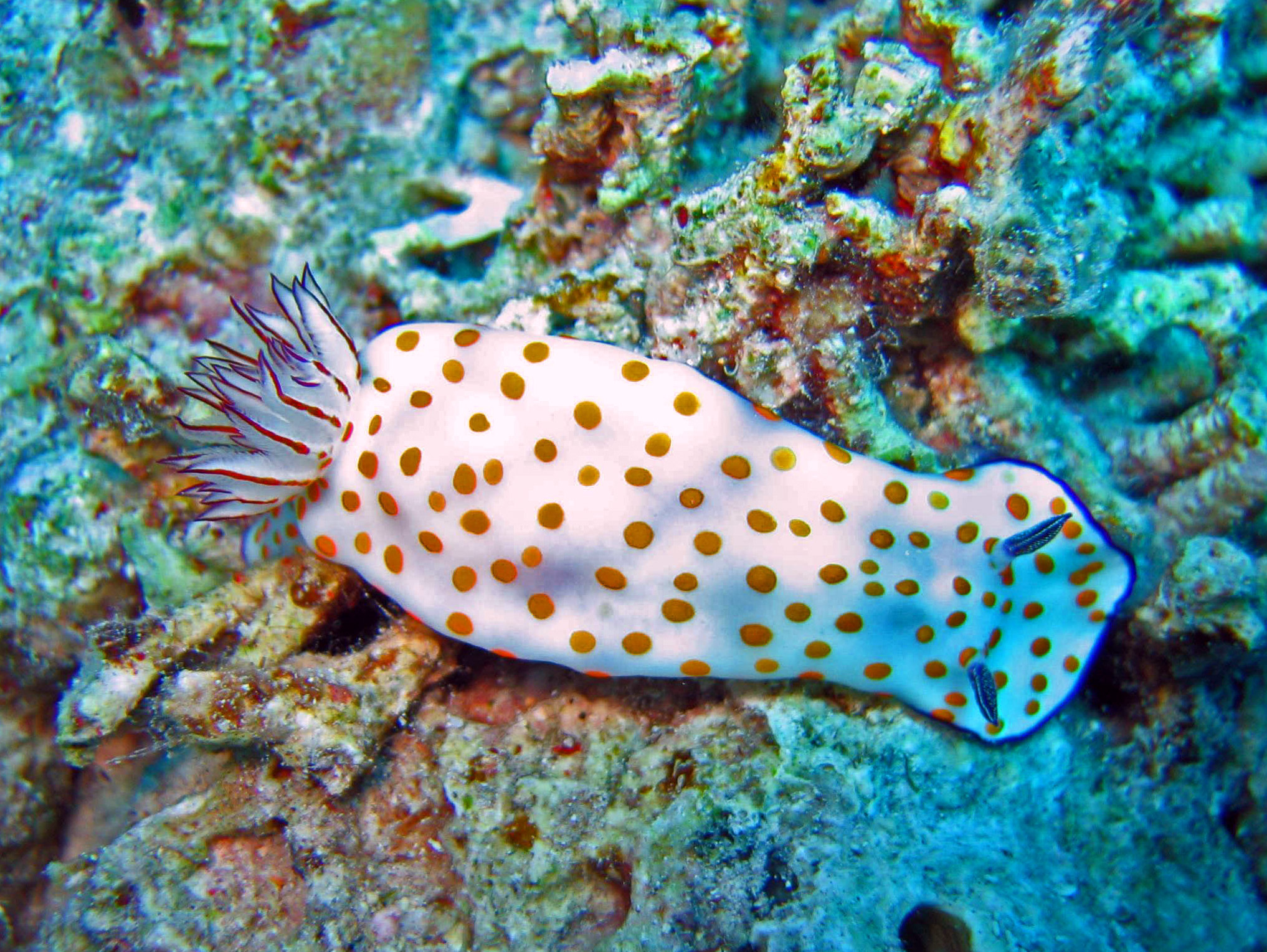
Hypselodoris pulchella

Hypselodoris purpureomaculosa

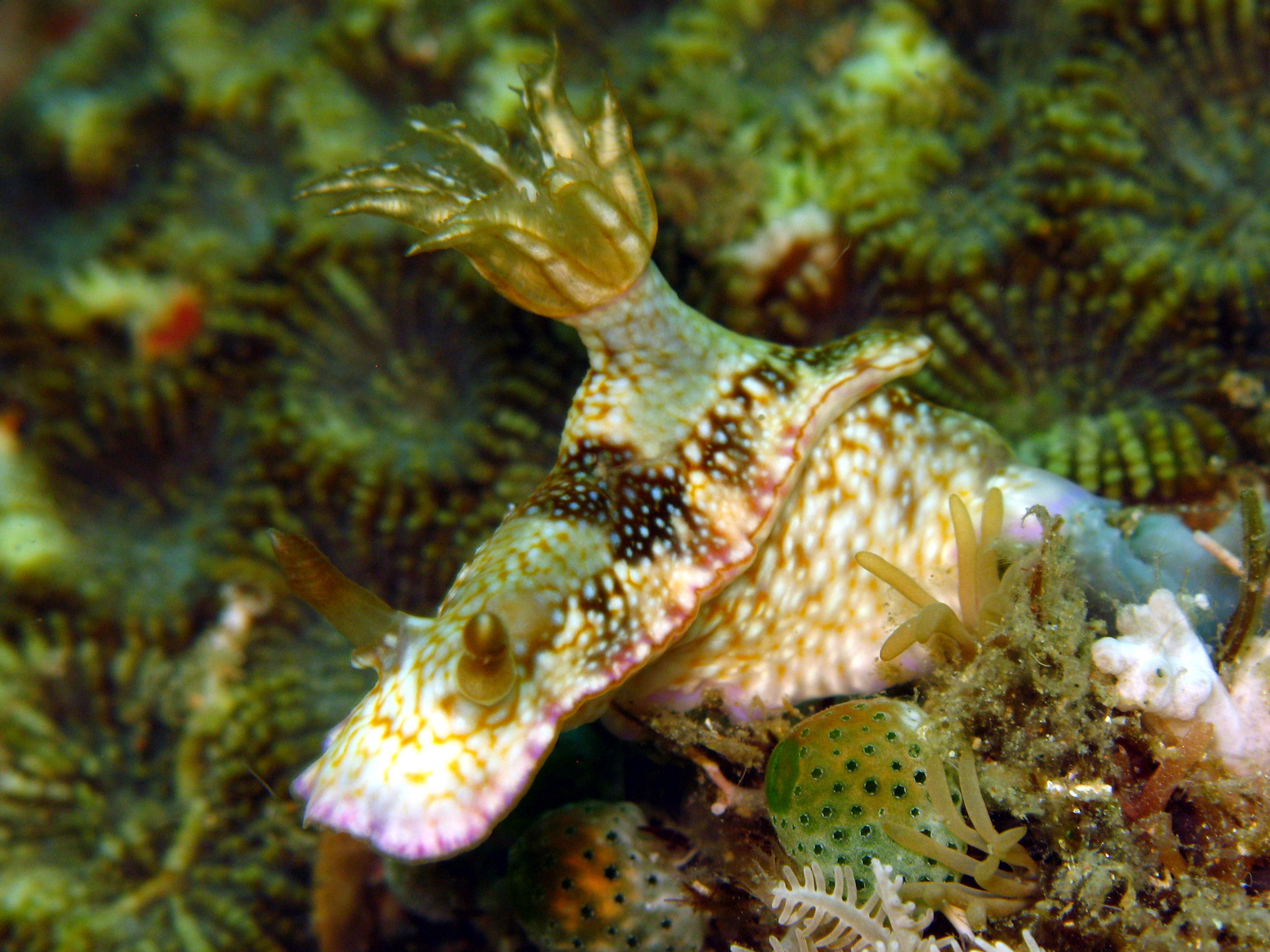
Hypselodoris reidi

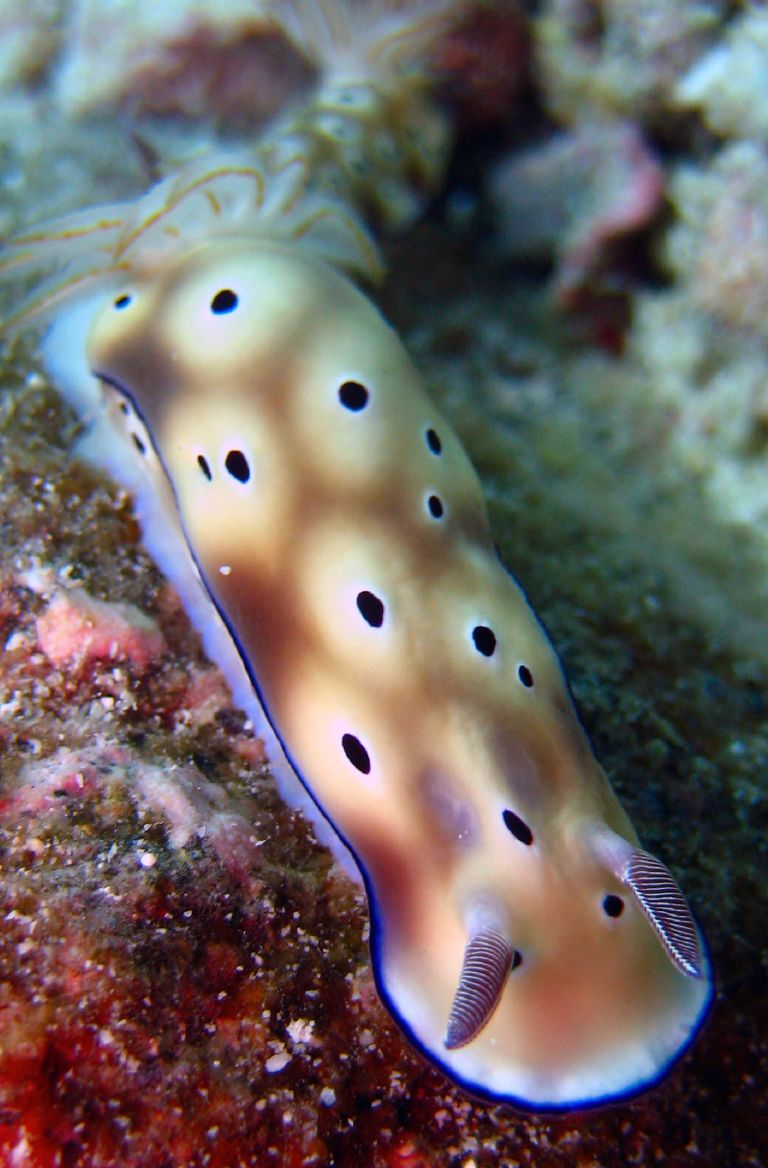
Hypselodoris tryoni

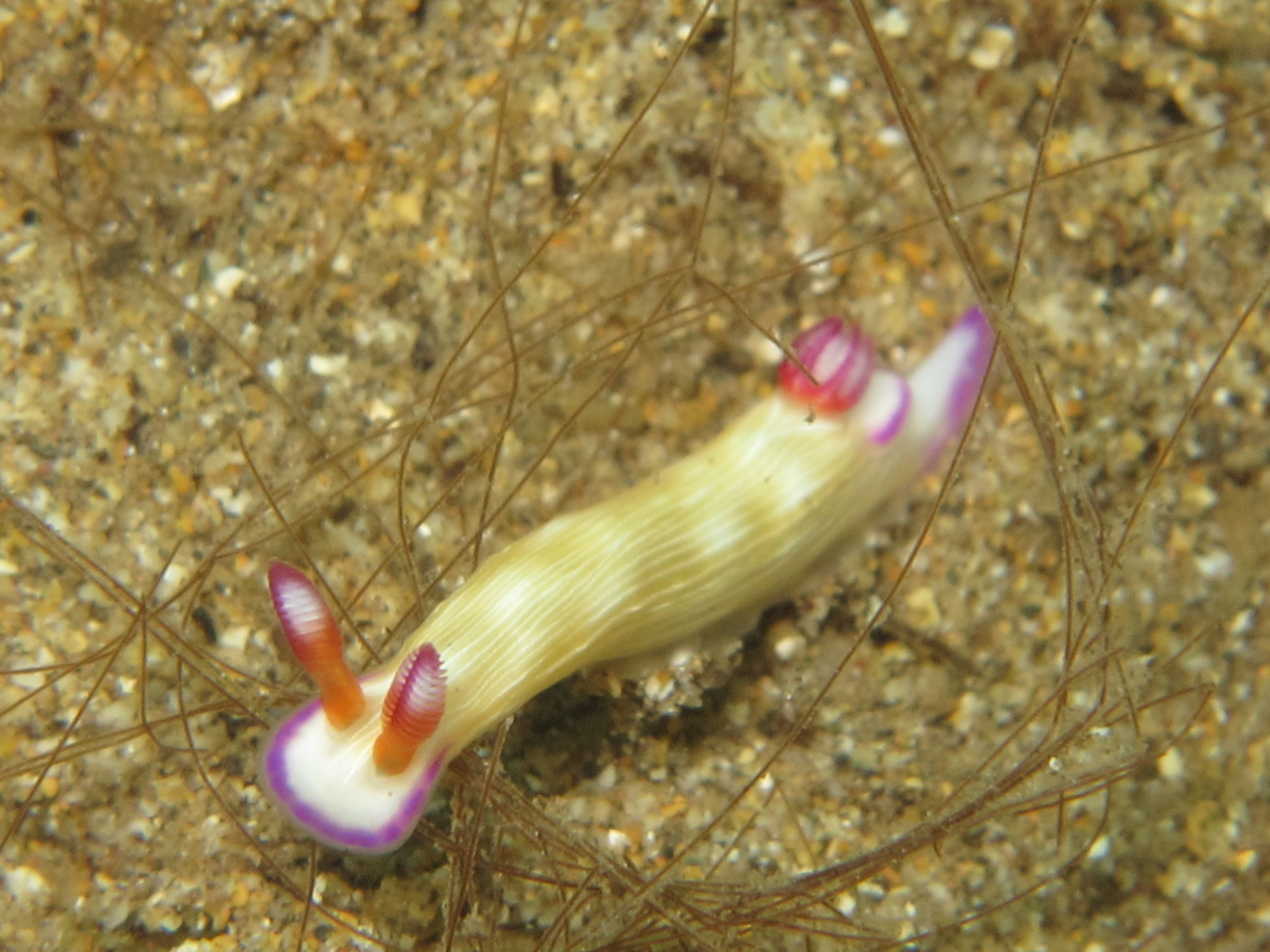
Hypselodoris violabranchia

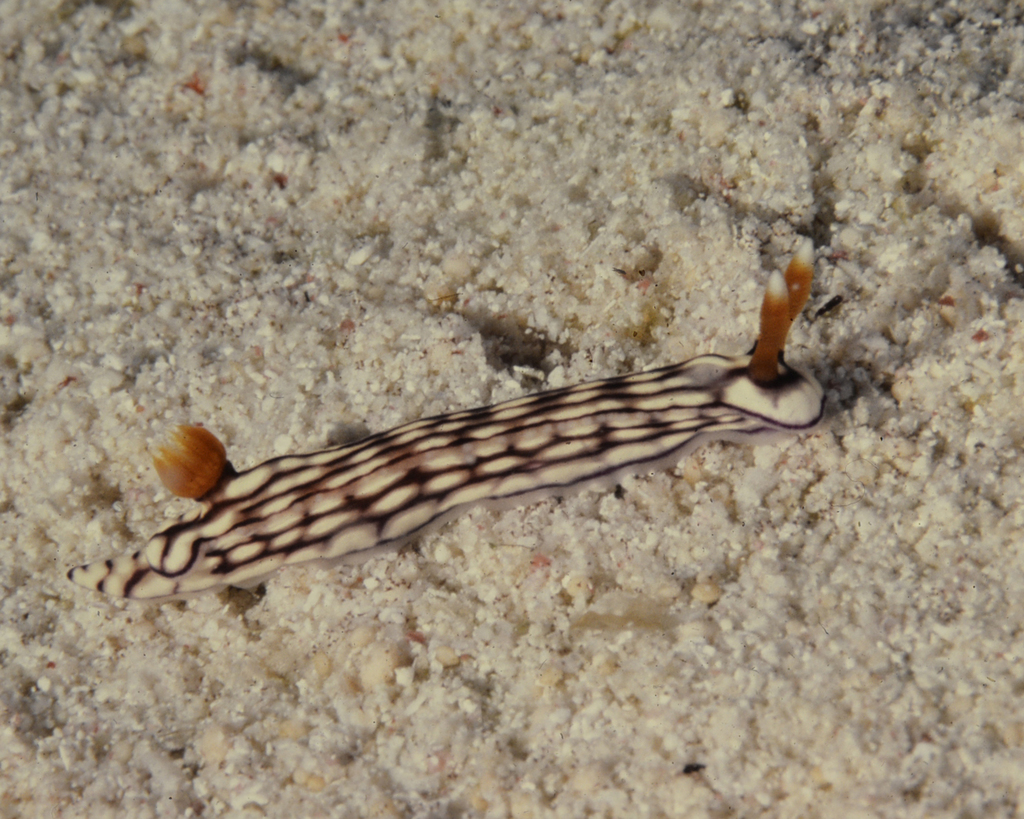
Hypselodoris whitei

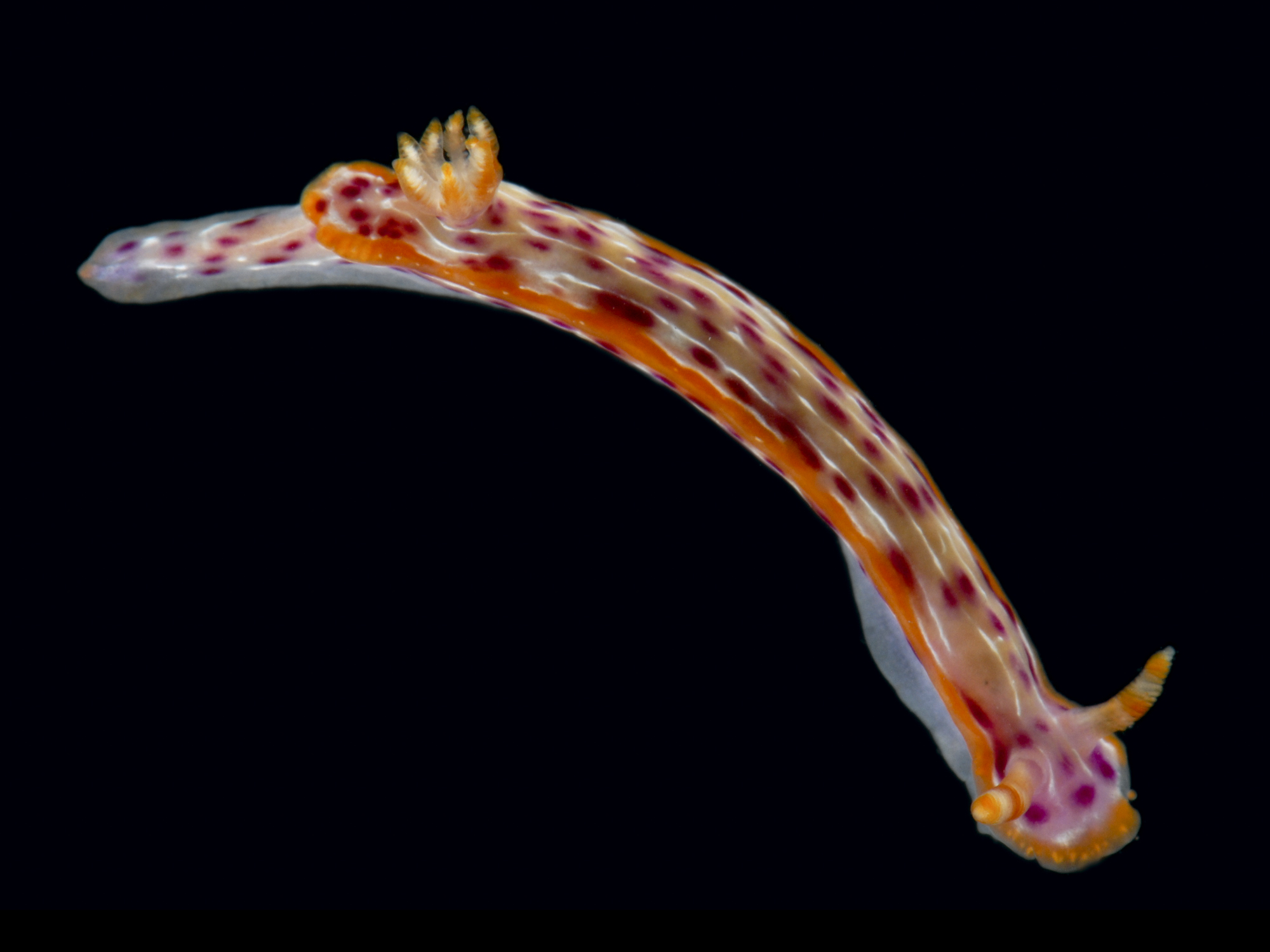
Hypselodoris yarae

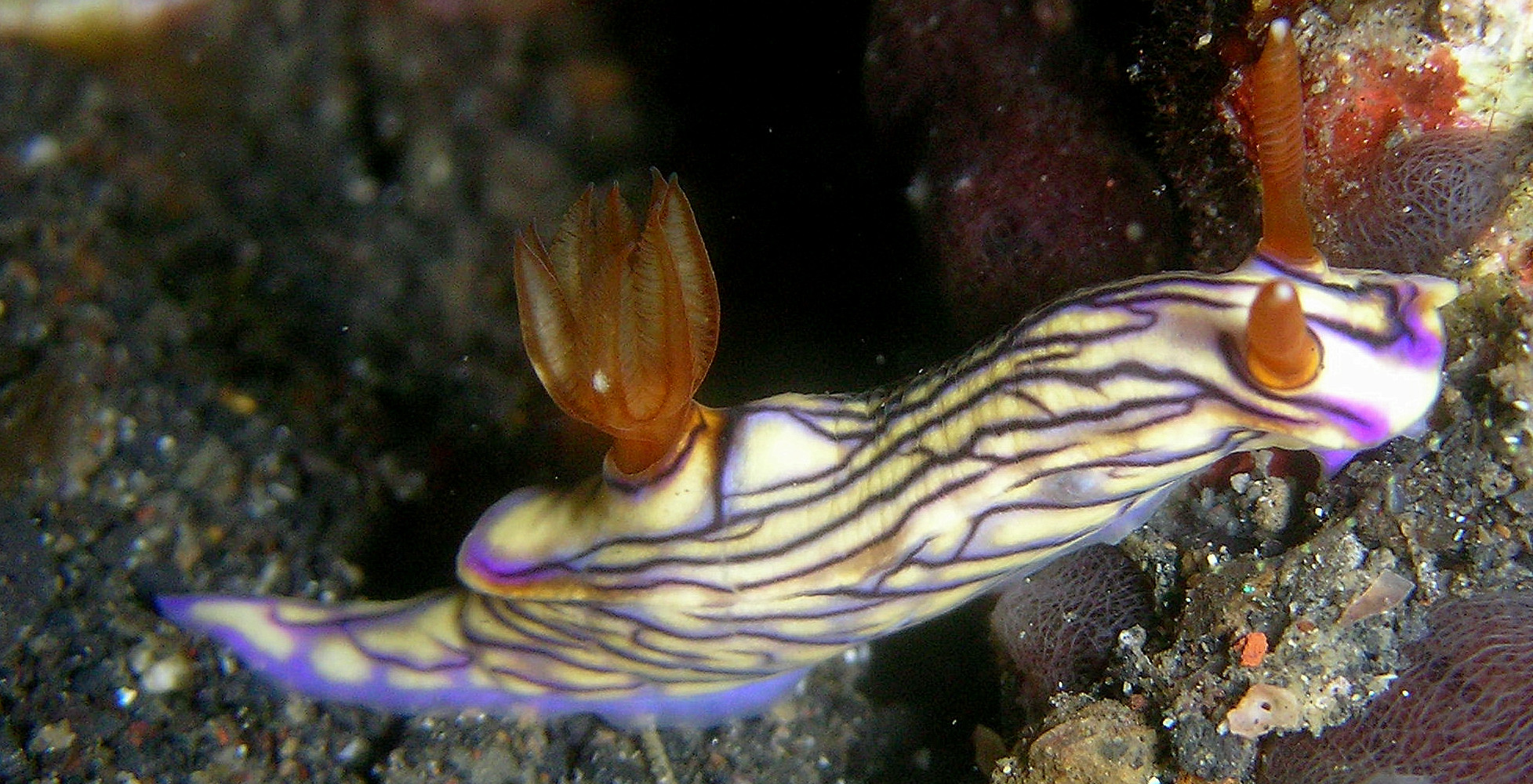
Hypselodoris zephyra

Species brought into synonymy

- Hypselodoris acriba Marcus & Marcus, 1967: synonym of Felimare acriba (Ev. Marcus & Er. Marcus, 1967)
- Hypselodoris aegialia (Bergh, 1904): synonym of Felimare agassizii (Bergh, 1894)
- Hypselodoris agassizii (Bergh, 1894): synonym of Felimare agassizii (Bergh, 1894)
- Hypselodoris alaini Ortea, Espinosa & Buske, 2013: synonym of Felimare alaini (Ortea, Espinosa & Buske, 2013)
- Hypselodoris andersoni Bertsch & Gosliner 1989: synonym of Hypselodoris peasei
- Hypselodoris bayeri (Ev. Marcus and Er. Marcus, 1967) : synonym of Felimare bayeri Ev. Marcus & Er. Marcus, 1967
- Hypselodoris bilineata (Pruvot-Fol, 1953): synonym of Felimare bilineata (Pruvot-Fol, 1953)
- Hypselodoris californiensis (Bergh, 1879) - California blue doris: synonym of Felimare californiensis (Bergh, 1879)
- Hypselodoris cantabrica Bouchet & Ortea, 1980: synonym of Felimare cantabrica (Bouchet & Ortea, 1980)
- Hypselodoris ciminoi Ortea, Valdes & Garcia-Gomez, 1996: synonym of Felimare ciminoi (Ortea & Valdés, 1996)
- Hypselodoris coelestis (Deshayes in Fredol, 1865): synonym of Hypselodoris orsinii (Vérany, 1846)
- Hypselodoris cuis Er. Marcus, 1965: probably a synonym of Hypselodoris maculosa
- Hypselodoris daniellae Kay & Young, 1969: synonym of Thorunna daniellae (Kay & Young, 1969)
- Hypselodoris decorata (Risbec, 1928): synonym of Hypselodoris maculosa (Pease, 1871)
- Hypselodoris edenticulata (White, 1952): synonym of Felimare picta (Schultz in Philippi, 1836)
- Hypselodoris elegans (Cantraine, 1835): synonym of Hypselodoris picta (Schultz in Philippi, 1836)
- Hypselodoris epicuria Basedow & Hedley, 1905: synonym of Chromodoris epicuria (Basedow & Hedley, 1905)
- Hypselodoris espinosai Ortea & Valdes in Ortea, Valdes & Garcia-Gomez, 1996: synonym of Felimare espinosai (Ortea & Valdés, 1996)
- Hypselodoris festiva (Angas, 1864): synonym of Mexichromis festiva (Angas, 1864)
- Hypselodoris fontandraui (Pruvot-Fol, 1951): synonym of Felimare fontandraui (Pruvot-Fol, 1951)
- Hypselodoris fortunensis Ortea, Espinosa & Buske, 2013: synonym of Felimare fortunensis (Ortea, Espinosa & Buske, 2013)
- Hypselodoris fregona Ortea & Caballer, 2013: synonym of Felimare fregona (Ortea & Caballer, 2013)
- Hypselodoris gasconi Ortea in Ortea, Valdés & García-Gómez, 1996: synonym of Felimare gasconi (Ortea, 1996)
- Hypselodoris ghiselini Bertsch, 1978: synonym of Felimare ghiselini (Bertsch, 1978)
- Hypselodoris gofasi Ortea & Valdés, 1996: synonym of Felimare gofasi (Ortea & Valdés, 1996)
- Hypselodoris juliae Dacosta, Padula & Schroedl, 2010 Felimare juliae (DaCosta, Padula & Schrödl, 2010)
- Hypselodoris katerythros Yonow, 2001: synonym of Hypselodoris emma Rudman, 1997
- Hypselodoris kayae Young, 1967: synonym of Verconia simplex (Pease, 1871)
- Hypselodoris koumacensis Rudman, 1995: synonym of Hypselodoris kaname Baba, 1994
- Hypselodoris kulonba Burn, 1966: synonym of Digidentis kulonba (Burn, 1966)
- Hypselodoris lajensis Troncoso, Garcia & Urgorri, 1998: synonym of Hypselodoris picta lajensis Troncoso, Garcia & Urgorri, 1998
- Hypselodoris lalique Ortea & Caballer, 2013: synonym of Felimare lalique (Ortea & Caballer, 2013)
- Hypselodoris lapislazuli (Bertsch & Ferreira, 1971): synonym of Felimare lapislazuli (Bertsch & Ferreira, 1974)
- Hypselodoris lilyeveae Alejandrino & Valdes, 2006: synonym of Felimare lilyeveae (Alejandrino & Valdés, 2006)
- Hypselodoris lineata (Souleyet, 1852): synonym of Hypselodoris maridadilus Rudman, 1977
- Hypselodoris malacitana Luque, 1986: synonym of Felimare malacitana (Luque, 1986)
- Hypselodoris marci Marcus, 1970: synonym of Felimare marci (Ev. Marcus, 1971)
- Hypselodoris midatlantica Gosliner, 1990: synonym of Felimare villafranca (Rissi, 1818)
- Hypselodoris mouaci (Risbec, 1930): synonym of Hypselodoris whitei (Adams & Reeve, 1850)
- Hypselodoris muniainae Ortea & Valdés, 1996: synonym of Felimare muniainae (Ortea & Valdés, 1996)
- Hypselodoris muniani Ortea & Valdes in Ortea, Valdes & Garcia-Gomez, 1996: synonym of Felimare muniainae (Ortea & Valdés, 1996)
- Hypselodoris nyalya (Marcus & Marcus, 1967): synonym of Risbecia nyalya (Ev. Marcus & Er. Marcus, 1967)
- Hypselodoris olgae Ortea & Bacallado, 2007: synonym of Felimare olgae (Ortea & Bacallado, 2007)
- Hypselodoris orsinii (Verany, 1846): synonym of Felimare orsinii (Vérany, 1846)
- Hypselodoris picta (Schultz, 1836): synonym of Felimare picta (Schultz in Philippi, 1836)
- Hypselodoris pinna Ortea, 1988: synonym of Felimare pinna (Ortea, 1988)
- Hypselodoris porterae (Cockerell, 1901): synonym of Mexichromis porterae (Cockerell, 1901)
- Hypselodoris punicea Rudman, 1995: synonym of Thorunna punicea Rudman, 1995
- Hypselodoris ruthae Marcus & Hughes, 1974: synonym of Felimare ruthae (Ev. Marcus & Hughes, 1974)
- Hypselodoris samueli Caballer & Ortea, 2012: synonym of Felimare samueli (Caballer & Ortea, 2012)
- Hypselodoris sycilla (Bergh, 1890): synonym of Felimare sycilla (Bergh, 1890)
- Hypselodoris tema Edmunds, 1981: synonym of Felimare tema (Edmunds, 1981)
- Hypselodoris tricolor (Cantraine, 1835): synonym of Felimare tricolor (Cantraine, 1835)
- Hypselodoris tryoni (Garrett, 1873): synonym of Risbecia tryoni (Garrett, 1873)
- Hypselodoris valenciennesi (Cantraine, 1841): synonym of Felimare picta (Schultz in Philippi, 1836)
- Hypselodoris vibrata (Pease, 1860): synonym of Goniobranchus vibratus (Pease, 1860)
- Hypselodoris villafranca (Risso, 1818): synonym of Felimare villafranca (Risso, 1818)
- Hypselodoris webbi (D'Orbigny, 1839): synonym of Hypselodoris picta (Schultz in Philippi, 1836)
- Hypselodoris xicoi Ortea, Valdes & Garcia-Gomez, 1996: synonym of Felimare xicoi (Ortea & Valdés, 1996)
- Hypselodoris zebra (Heilprin, 1889): synonym of Felimare zebra (Heilprin, 1889)
