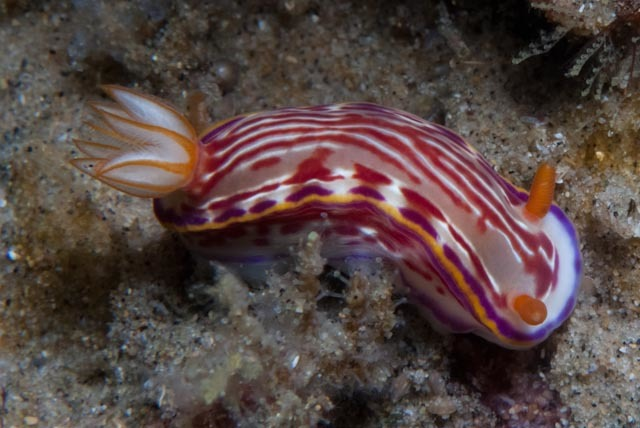

Scientific classification
- Kingdom: Animalia
- Phylum: Mollusca
- Class: Gastropoda
- Order: Nudibranchia
- Family: Chromodorididae
- Genus: Hypselodoris
- Species: H. fucata

Binomial name
- Hypselodoris fucata Gosliner & Johnson, 1999

= Hypselodoris fucata =

Species of gastropod

Hypselodoris fucata is a species of sea slug or dorid nudibranch, a marine gastropod mollusk in the family Chromodorididae.

== Distribution ==
This nudibranch is known from South Africa, along the KwaZulu-Natal coast.

== Description ==
Hypselodoris fucata has a white body and a purple-blue mantle edge and foot. There is also often a yellow line on the very edge of the mantle. The body and dorsum have red-brown striations running longitudinally. The gills are white, lined with orange and the rhinophores are a bright orange colour. This species can reach a total length of at least 50 mm. It is similar in colour pattern to Hypselodoris kaname and Hypselodoris paulinae.
