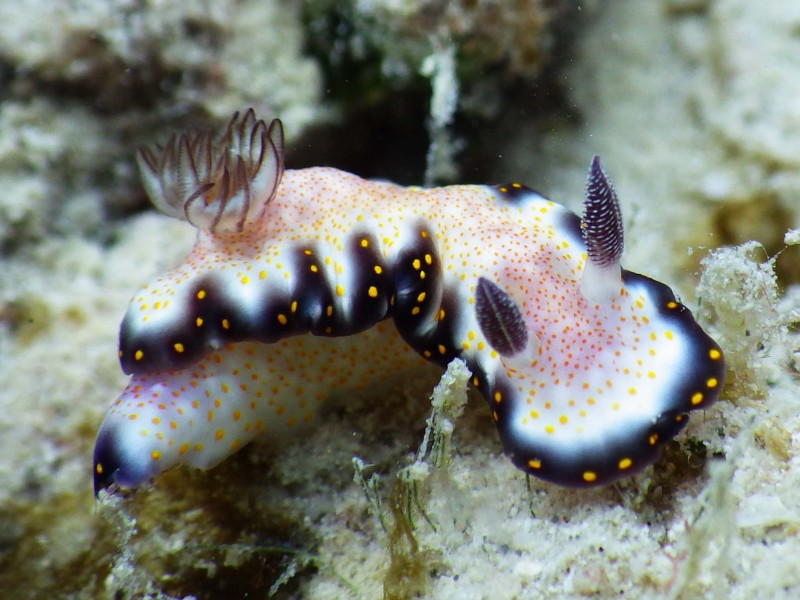

Scientific classification
- Kingdom: Animalia
- Phylum: Mollusca
- Class: Gastropoda
- Order: Nudibranchia
- Family: Chromodorididae
- Genus: Hypselodoris
- Species: H. godeffroyana

Binomial name
- Hypselodoris godeffroyana (Bergh, 1877)

Synonyms
- Chromodoris godeffroyana Bergh, 1877; Risbecia godeffroyana (Bergh, 1877)

= Hypselodoris godeffroyana =

Species of gastropod

Hypselodoris godeffroyana is a species of sea slug, a dorid nudibranch, a marine gastropod mollusk in the family Chromodorididae.

== Distribution ==
This species was described from Huaheine, French Polynesia, 16.743468°S 150.952154°W It occurs in numerous locations in the tropical Western Pacific Ocean.
