= Hypselodoris alburtuqali =

Scientific classification
- Kingdom: Animalia
- Phylum: Mollusca
- Class: Gastropoda
- Order: Nudibranchia
- Family: Chromodorididae
- Genus: Hypselodoris
- Species: H. alburtuqali

Binomial name
- Hypselodoris alburtuqali Gosliner & Johnson, 2018

Species of gastropod

Hypselodoris alburtuqali is a species of sea slug or dorid nudibranch, a marine gastropod mollusc in the family Chromodorididae.

== Distribution ==
This nudibranch was described from Abulad Island, Farasan Islands, Saudi Arabia, Red Sea. It is known only from the Red Sea.

== Description ==
Hypselodoris alburtuqali has a translucent pink to white body with a series of brilliant white longitudinal lines running along its body and upper dorsum. Between the lines at regular intervals there are lines of regularly spaced dark brown spots, with similar slightly larger spots merging with the white line at the edge of the mantle. There is an orange margin to the mantle at the front and back and an orange margin to the tail. The gills have translucent bases and orange pigment at the tips and sides. The rhinophores are opaque white, with two bands of orange.

This species can reach a total length of at least 30 mm.
