= Hypselodoris jacksoni =

Scientific classification
- Kingdom: Animalia
- Phylum: Mollusca
- Class: Gastropoda
- Order: Nudibranchia
- Family: Chromodorididae
- Genus: Hypselodoris
- Species: H. jacksoni

Binomial name
- Hypselodoris jacksoni Wilson & Willan, 2007

Species of gastropod

Hypselodoris jacksoni is a species of colourful sea slug or dorid nudibranch, a marine gastropod mollusk in the family Chromodorididae.

== Distribution ==
This nudibranch is found in eastern Australia throughout the Coral Sea.

== Description ==
Hypselodoris jacksoni has a yellow and white body with an orange mantle. There are black longitudinal lines along the sides of its body, and a black crissed-crossed pattern of lines on its dorsum. The rhinophores are bright orange, and the gills are white, outlined with orange. This species can reach a total length of at least 35 mm and has been observed feeding on yellow sponges from the genus Euryspongia.
