= Hypselodoris paulinae =

Scientific classification
- Kingdom: Animalia
- Phylum: Mollusca
- Class: Gastropoda
- Order: Nudibranchia
- Family: Chromodorididae
- Genus: Hypselodoris
- Species: H. paulinae

Binomial name
- Hypselodoris paulinae Gosliner & Johnson, 1999

Species of gastropod

Hypselodoris paulinae is a species of sea slug or dorid nudibranch, a marine gastropod mollusk in the family Chromodorididae.

== Distribution ==
This nudibranch is found in the Hawaiian Islands in the central Pacific Ocean.

== Description ==
Hypselodoris paulinae has a white-cream body which is covered all over with red-brown spots and lines. The gills and rhinophores are also white, lined with red. This species can reach a total length of at least 60 mm. It has some similarity to Hypselodoris kaname.
