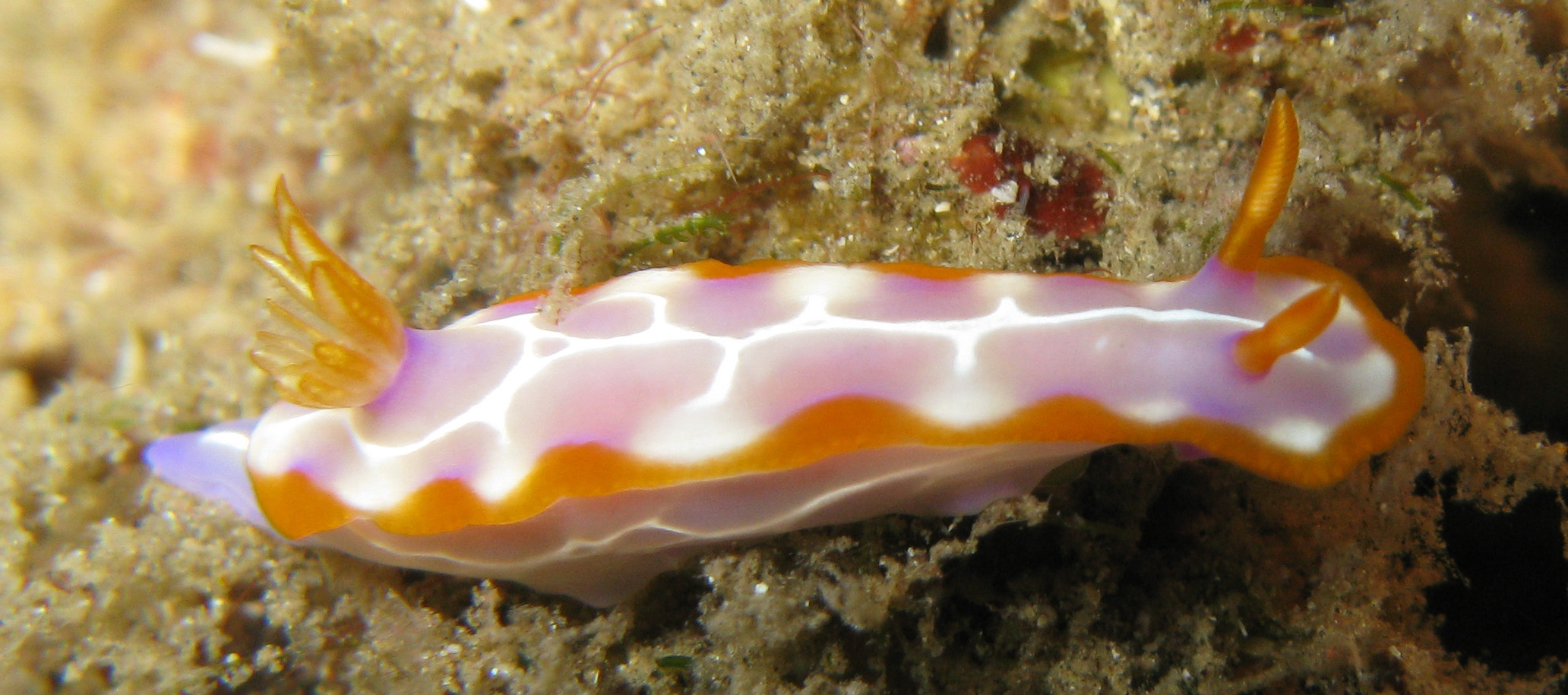

Scientific classification
- Kingdom: Animalia
- Phylum: Mollusca
- Class: Gastropoda
- Order: Nudibranchia
- Family: Chromodorididae
- Genus: Hypselodoris
- Species: H. iacula

Binomial name
- Hypselodoris iacula Gosliner & Johnson, 1999

= Hypselodoris iacula =

Species of gastropod

Hypselodoris iacula is a species of colourful sea slug in the family Chromodorididae.

== Distribution ==
This nudibranch is known from the Western Pacific Ocean including Indonesia, the Philippines and Thailand.

== Description ==
Hypselodoris iacula has a pink body and a bright orange mantle. The body and dorsum are covered in a white mesh-like pattern. The gills and rhinophores are orange. This species can reach a total length of at least 25 mm and has been observed feeding on sponges from the genus Euryspongia.
