= Hypselodoris flavomarginata =

Scientific classification
- Kingdom: Animalia
- Phylum: Mollusca
- Class: Gastropoda
- Order: Nudibranchia
- Family: Chromodorididae
- Genus: Hypselodoris
- Species: H. flavomarginata

Binomial name
- Hypselodoris flavomarginata Rudman, 1995

Species of gastropod

Hypselodoris flavomarginata is a species of sea slug or dorid nudibranch, a marine gastropod mollusk in the family Chromodorididae.

== Distribution ==
This nudibranch is known only from New Caledonia in the southern Pacific Ocean.

== Description ==
Hypselodoris flavomarginata has a pink body and a wide light-yellow mantle edge. A thinner white line separates the yellow mantle from the pink body and dorsum. The gills and rhinophores are white and dark-pink. This species can reach a total length of at least 25 mm and feeds on sponges.
