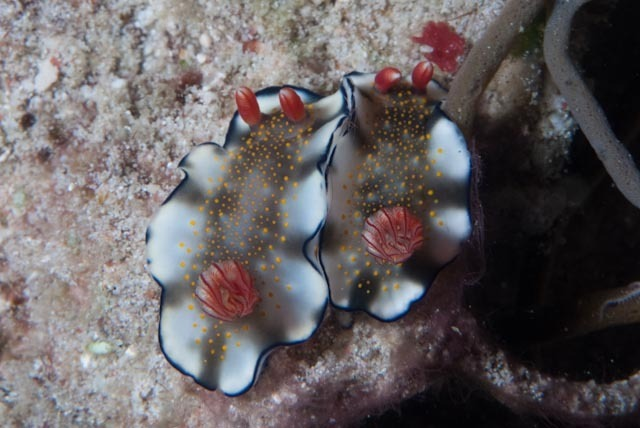

Scientific classification
- Kingdom: Animalia
- Phylum: Mollusca
- Class: Gastropoda
- Order: Nudibranchia
- Family: Chromodorididae
- Genus: Hypselodoris
- Species: H. bollandi

Binomial name
- Hypselodoris bollandi Gosliner & Johnson, 1999

= Hypselodoris bollandi =

Species of gastropod

Hypselodoris bollandi is a species of colourful sea slug or dorid nudibranch, a marine gastropod mollusk in the family Chromodorididae.

== Distribution ==
This nudibranch is found in the Western Pacific Ocean from the Philippines to Okinawa.

== Description ==
Hypselodoris bollandi has a white body which is covered all over in tiny yellow dots. Its mantle edge is black-blue and dark spots are sometimes present on its dorsum. The gills and rhinophores are white, outlined with red. There is some colour variation in this species

This nudibranch can reach a total length of at least 30 mm.
