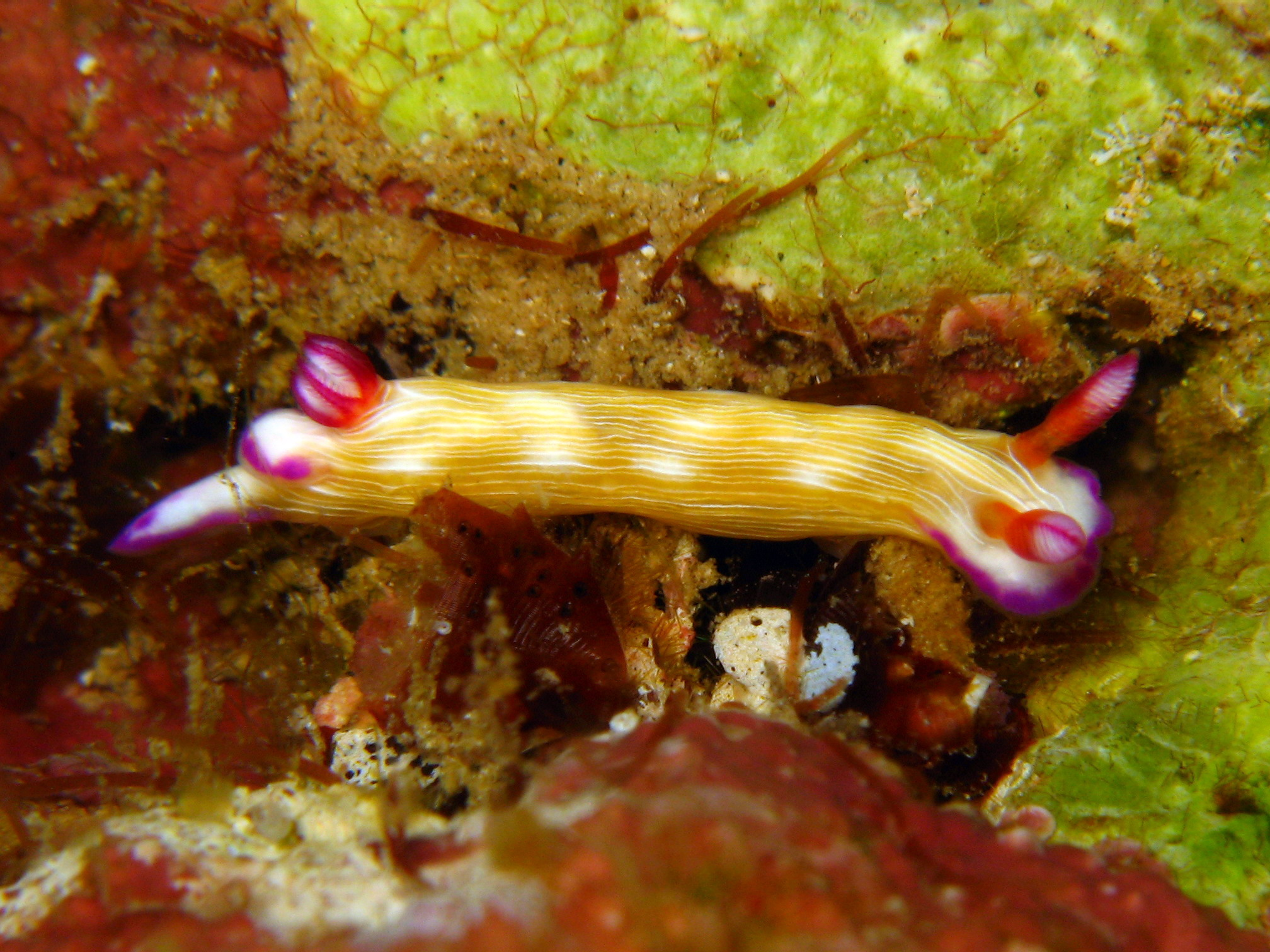

Scientific classification
- Kingdom: Animalia
- Phylum: Mollusca
- Class: Gastropoda
- Order: Nudibranchia
- Family: Chromodorididae
- Genus: Hypselodoris
- Species: H. violabranchia

Binomial name
- Hypselodoris violabranchia Gosliner & Johnson, 1999

= Hypselodoris violabranchia =

Species of gastropod

Hypselodoris violabranchia is a species of sea slug or dorid nudibranch, a marine gastropod mollusk in the family Chromodorididae.

== Distribution ==
This nudibranch is known from the Hawaiian Islands in the central Pacific Ocean.

== Description ==
Hypselodoris violabranchia has a light brown body with white spots and lines running along its dorsum. The gills and rhinophores are purple or pink.

This species can reach a total length of at least 35 mm.
