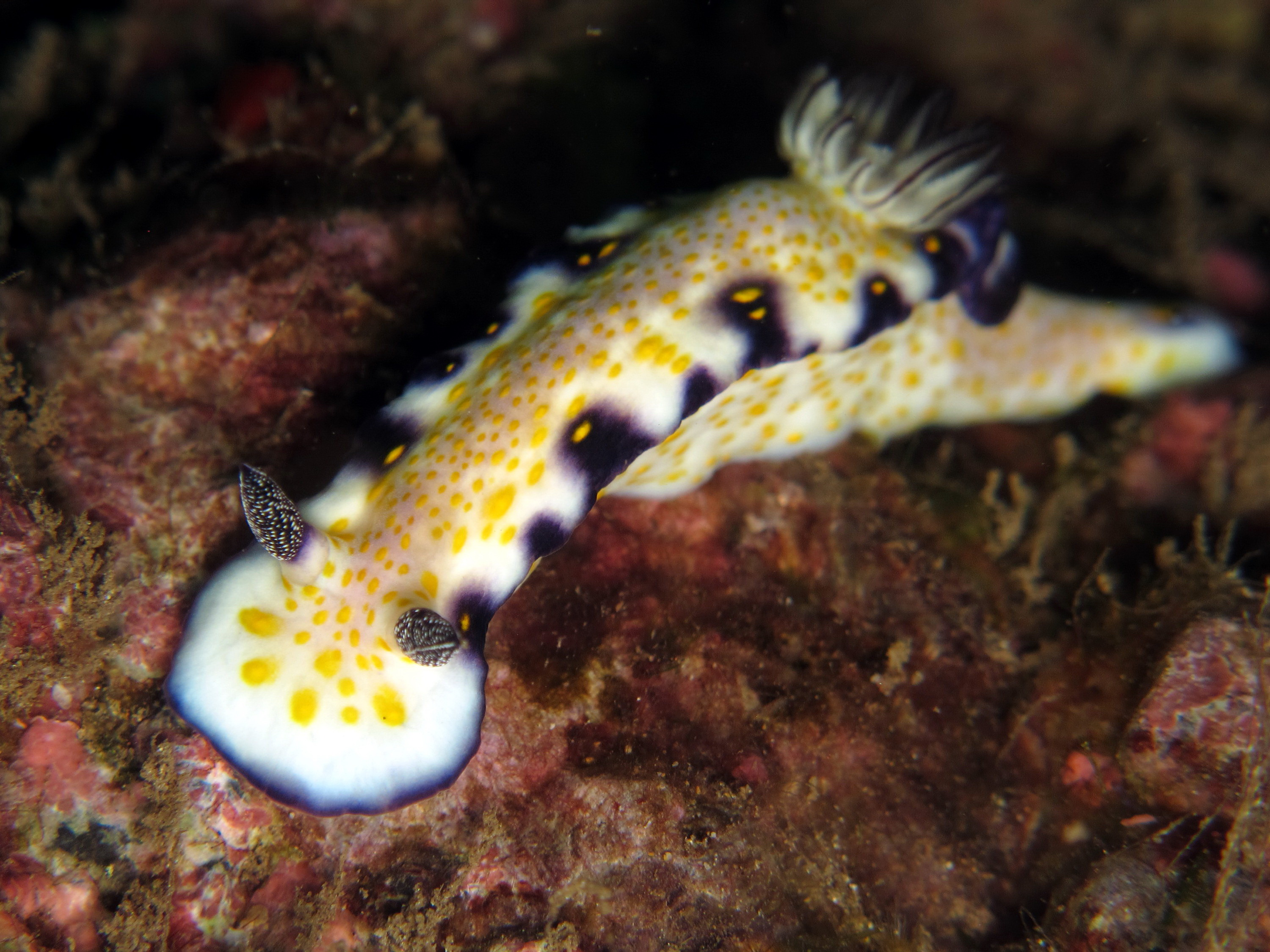

Scientific classification
- Kingdom: Animalia
- Phylum: Mollusca
- Class: Gastropoda
- Order: Nudibranchia
- Family: Chromodorididae
- Genus: Hypselodoris
- Species: H. imperialis

Binomial name
- Hypselodoris imperialis (Pease, 1860)

Synonyms
- Chromodoris imperialis (Pease, 1860); Doriprismatica imperialis (Pease, 1860); Doris prismatica var. imperialis Pease, 1860 (basionym); Risbecia imperialis (Pease, 1860)

= Hypselodoris imperialis =

Species of gastropod

Hypselodoris imperialis is a species of sea slug, a dorid nudibranch, a marine gastropod mollusk in the family Chromodorididae.

== Distribution ==
This species was described from Hawaii. It is reported from many locations in the tropical Western Pacific Ocean from Australia to Hawaii.
