= Hypselodoris rosans =

Scientific classification
- Kingdom: Animalia
- Phylum: Mollusca
- Class: Gastropoda
- Order: Nudibranchia
- Family: Chromodorididae
- Genus: Hypselodoris
- Species: H. rosans

Binomial name
- Hypselodoris rosans (Bergh, 1889)

Synonyms
- Chromodoris rosans Bergh, 1889 basionym

Species of gastropod

Hypselodoris rosans is a species of colourful sea slug or dorid nudibranch, a marine gastropod mollusc in the family Chromodorididae.

== Distribution ==
This species was described from Ile aux Fouquets, Mauritius, Indian Ocean. This species has not been reported by subsequent authors. Animals reported from Réunion and Madagascar as Chromodoris bullocki are possibly this species in view of the revision of the Hypselodoris bullocki clade in 2018.

== Description ==
Bergh suggests a possible synonymy with Chromodoris bullocki and quotes Moebius' description as follows (translated from German) "bright rose-red on the back, the mantle with snow-white margin; the rhinophores saffron yellow with scarlet margins of the leaves; the (9) gill leaves on the ground saffron yellow, otherwise scarlet red; the back of the tail bluish red ".
