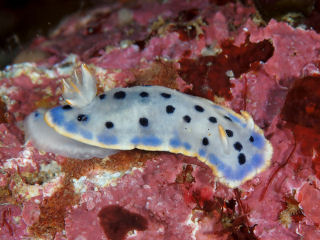

Scientific classification
- Kingdom: Animalia
- Phylum: Mollusca
- Class: Gastropoda
- Order: Nudibranchia
- Family: Chromodorididae
- Genus: Hypselodoris
- Species: H. placida

Binomial name
- Hypselodoris placida (Baba, 1949)

= Hypselodoris placida =

Species of gastropod

Hypselodoris placida is a species of sea slug or dorid nudibranch. It is a marine gastropod mollusk in the family Chromodorididae.

== Distribution ==
This nudibranch is only found in Japan and the seas around Hong Kong.

== Description ==
The hypselodoris placida has an opaque white body and a white-blue mantle edge and foot. There are black specks present on the upper dorsum and body. The gills and rhinophores are white, tipped with yellow.

This species can reach a total length of at least 20 mm.
