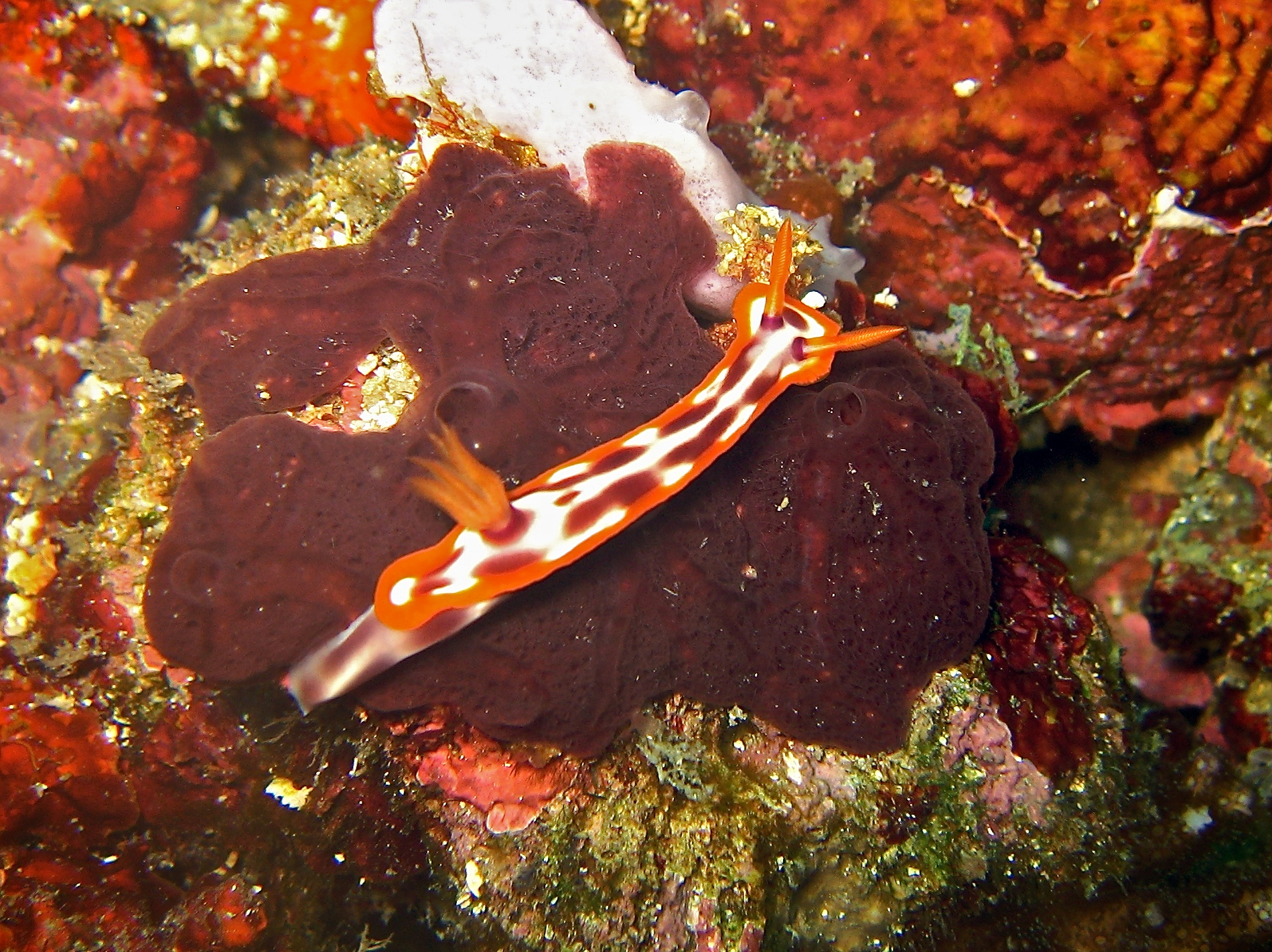
- Hypselodoris purpureomaculosa at Verde Island, the Philippines.

Scientific classification
- Kingdom: Animalia
- Phylum: Mollusca
- Class: Gastropoda
- Order: Nudibranchia
- Family: Chromodorididae
- Genus: Hypselodoris
- Species: H. purpureomaculosa

Binomial name
- Hypselodoris purpureomaculosa Hamatani, 1995

= Hypselodoris purpureomaculosa =

Species of mollusc

Hypselodoris purpureomaculosa is a species of colourful sea slug or dorid nudibranch, a marine gastropod mollusk in the family Chromodorididae.

== Distribution ==
This nudibranch is found in Japan, Okinawa and the Philippines.

== Description ==
Hypselodoris purpureomaculosa is white, with a distinct orange fringed mantle, orange gills and rhinophores. The specific epithet purpureomaculosa refers to the purple spots on its upper mantle that vary in colour from red to black in some individuals. This species reaches a length of at least 40 mm.

== Ecology ==
Hypselodoris purpureomaculosa feeds on sponges and appears to eat mainly the purple coloured sponges of the genus Euryspongia.
