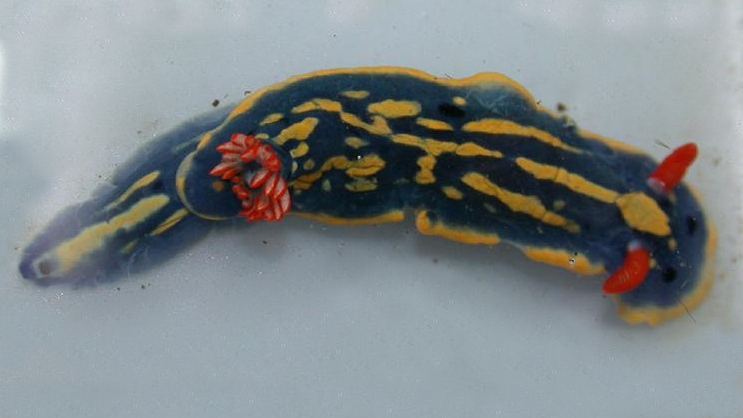

Scientific classification
- Kingdom: Animalia
- Phylum: Mollusca
- Class: Gastropoda
- Order: Nudibranchia
- Family: Chromodorididae
- Genus: Hypselodoris
- Species: H. festiva

Binomial name
- Hypselodoris festiva (A. Adams, 1861)

Synonyms
- Doriprismatica festiva — A. Adams, 1861 (original combination); Chromodoris marenzelleri — Bergh, 1888; Chromodoris festiva — (A. Adams, 1861); Glossodoris festiva — (A. Adams, 1861)

= Hypselodoris festiva =

Species of gastropod

Hypselodoris festiva, the festive sea slug, is a common species of colourful sea slug or dorid nudibranch, a marine gastropod mollusk in the family Chromodorididae. It eats sponges.

== Distribution ==
This nudibranch was described from Tsushima, Korea Strait, Japan. It is found in Japan, Hong Kong, and also Korea.

== Description ==
Hypselodoris festiva has a dark blue mantle with a central longitudinal yellow line, which may be broken, yellow spots and a yellow margin. The yellow spots may join up to form two more lines and in large individuals extra yellow spots develop between them. The rhinophores have blue shafts and red lamellae on the clubs. The gill leaves are translucent white with a single red line on the outer edge and red lines on the inner edges. It is preyed upon by Gymnodoris rubropapulosa.
