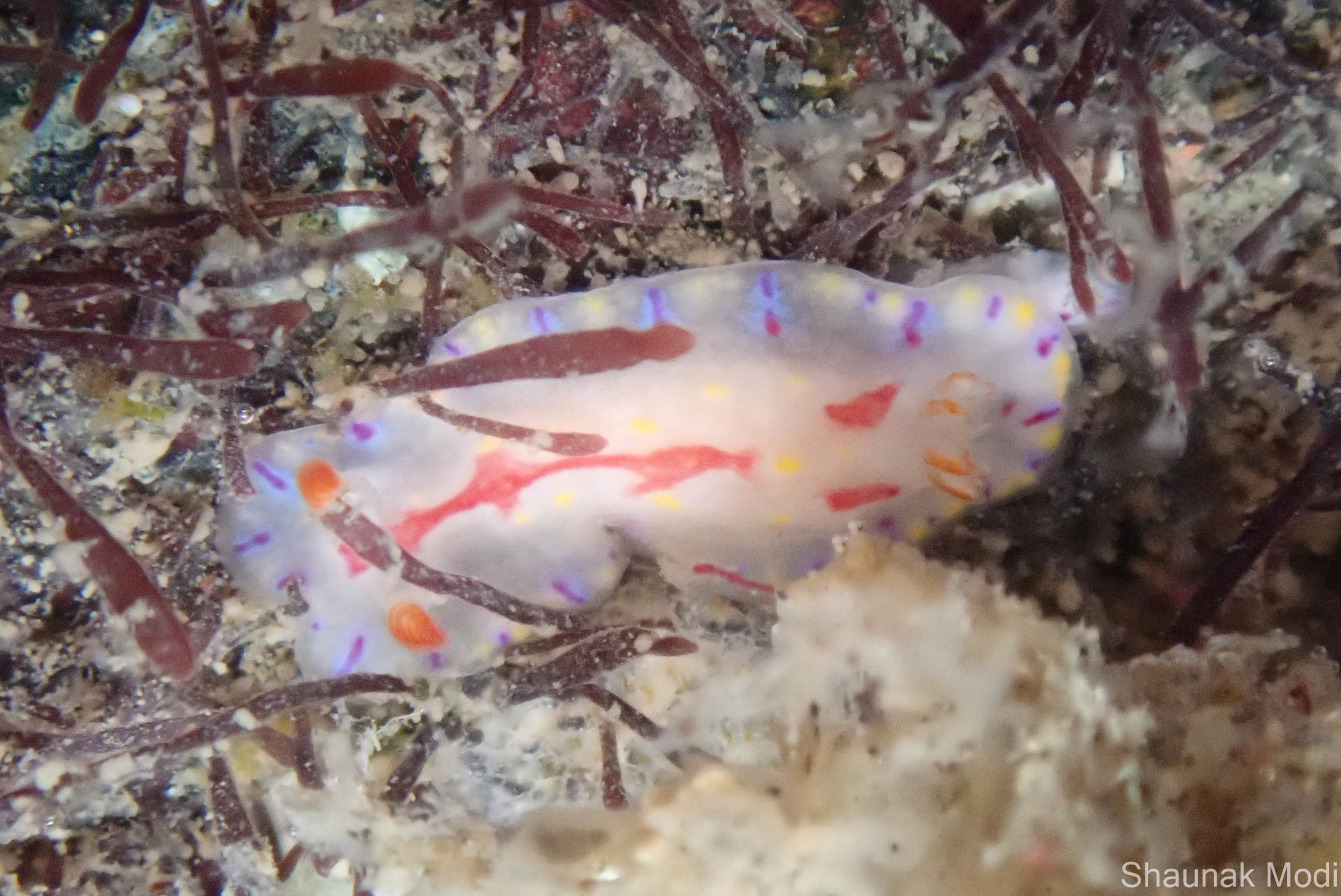

Scientific classification
- Kingdom: Animalia
- Phylum: Mollusca
- Class: Gastropoda
- Order: Nudibranchia
- Family: Chromodorididae
- Genus: Hypselodoris
- Species: H. zebrina

Binomial name
- Hypselodoris zebrina (Alder & Hancock, 1864)

Synonyms
- Chromodoris zebrina Alder & Hancock, 1864

= Hypselodoris zebrina =

Species of gastropod

Hypselodoris zebrina is a species of colourful sea slug or dorid nudibranch, a marine gastropod mollusc in the family Chromodorididae. After initially being described from south-eastern India in 1864, this species was not seen again until 2002, nearly 150 years later.

== Distribution ==
This nudibranch was described from near Visakhapatnam, Andhra Pradesh, on the east coast of India. It is found in the Indo-Pacific Ocean from India to Thailand.

== Description ==
Hypselodoris zebrina has a white body which has purple dots running longitudinally beneath its mantle. The mantle edge is often yellow. On the dorsum there are purple lines and yellow dots. The gills and rhinophores are white, outlined in red.

This species can reach a total length of at least 50 mm (2.0 in).
