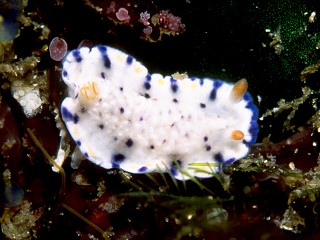

Scientific classification
- Kingdom: Animalia
- Phylum: Mollusca
- Class: Gastropoda
- Order: Nudibranchia
- Family: Chromodorididae
- Genus: Hypselodoris
- Species: H. sagamiensis

Binomial name
- Hypselodoris sagamiensis (Baba 1949)

Synonyms
- Glossodoris sagamiensis Baba, 1949 (basionym)

= Hypselodoris sagamiensis =

Species of gastropod

Hypselodoris sagamiensis is a species of sea slug or dorid nudibranch, a marine gastropod mollusk in the family Chromodorididae.

== Distribution ==
This nudibranch is known only from Japan, India

== Description ==
Hypselodoris sagamiensis has a white-translucent body with black spots on its mantle. The mantle is edged with an outer purple and inner yellow line. The gills and rhinophores are orange, sometimes outlined in white.

This species can reach a total length of at least 30 mm and has been observed feeding on sponges from the genus Euryspongia.
