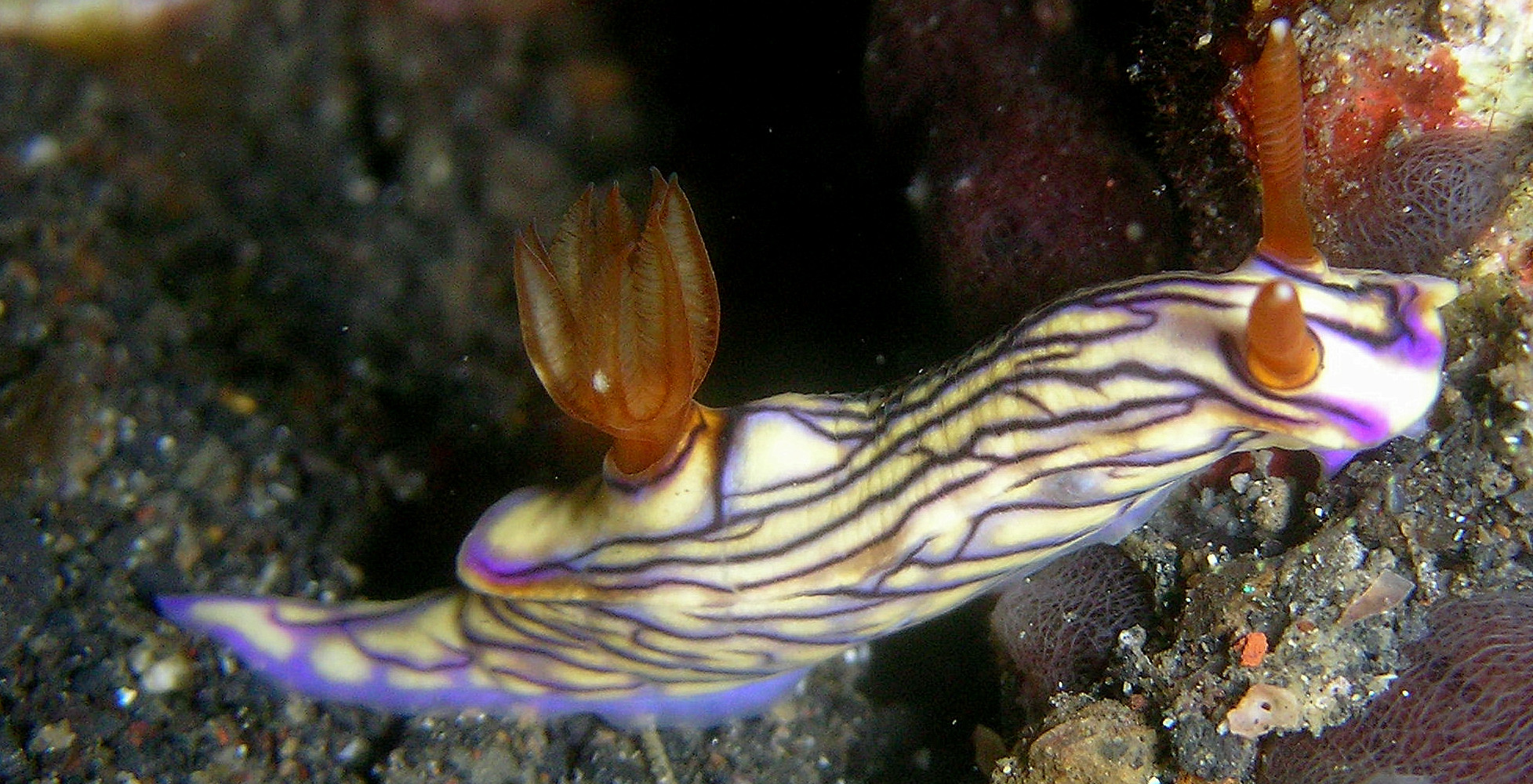

Scientific classification
- Kingdom: Animalia
- Phylum: Mollusca
- Class: Gastropoda
- Order: Nudibranchia
- Family: Chromodorididae
- Genus: Hypselodoris
- Species: H. zephyra

Binomial name
- Hypselodoris zephyra Gosliner & Johnson, 1999

= Hypselodoris zephyra =

Species of gastropod

Hypselodoris zephyra is a species of colourful sea slug or dorid nudibranch, a marine gastropod mollusk in the family Chromodorididae.

== Distribution ==
This nudibranch was described from Madang, Papua New Guinea. It is found in the Western and Central Pacific Ocean.

== Description ==
Hypselodoris zephyra has a white body with black striated lines running all over the body and upper dorsum. The mantle and foot have a purple marginal line. The gills and rhinophores are orange-red with white tips. This species can reach a total length of at least 20 mm (0.79 in) and feeds on blue sponges from the genus Dysidea. It is similar in colour pattern to Hypselodoris nigrostriata.
