= Hypselodoris babai =

Scientific classification
- Kingdom: Animalia
- Phylum: Mollusca
- Class: Gastropoda
- Order: Nudibranchia
- Family: Chromodorididae
- Genus: Hypselodoris
- Species: H. babai

Binomial name
- Hypselodoris babai Gosliner & Behrens, 2000

Species of gastropod

Hypselodoris babai is a species of colourful sea slug or dorid nudibranch, a marine gastropod mollusc in the family Chromodorididae.

== Distribution ==
This nudibranch was described from Seragaki, Okinawa, Japan. It has been reported from the Western Pacific Ocean from Australia to Okinawa.

== Description ==
Hypselodoris babai has a bright orange body with a white lined mantle and foot. It has white spots on its dorsum and body. The gills and rhinophores are orange. This species can reach a total length of at least 40 mm and has been observed feeding on sponges from the genus Euryspongia.
