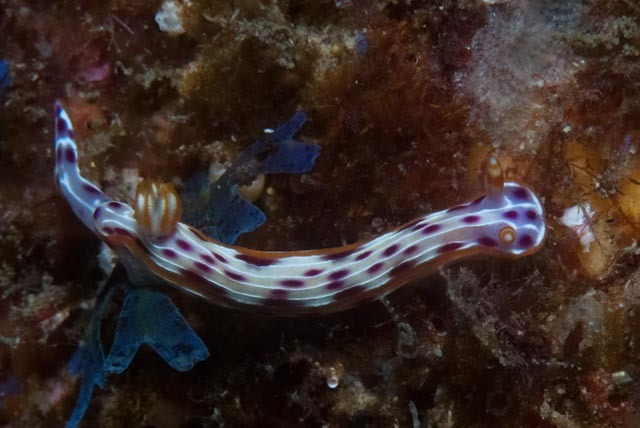

Scientific classification
- Kingdom: Animalia
- Phylum: Mollusca
- Class: Gastropoda
- Order: Nudibranchia
- Family: Chromodorididae
- Genus: Hypselodoris
- Species: H. yarae

Binomial name
- Hypselodoris yarae Gosliner & Johnson, 2018

= Hypselodoris yarae =

Species of gastropod

Hypselodoris yarae is a species of sea slug or dorid nudibranch, a marine gastropod mollusc in the family Chromodorididae.

== Distribution ==
This nudibranch was described from Mozambique and Madagascar, Indian Ocean. It is also known from Kenya and possibly South Africa, Sri Lanka and the Red Sea. It was previously reported from the Indian Ocean as Hypselodoris maculosa, a species from the Western Pacific.

== Description ==
Hypselodoris yarae has a translucent white body with pale brown viscera showing through and a series of opaque white longitudinal lines of variable thickness running along its mantle. Between the lines at irregular intervals there are slightly diffuse red spots with darker centres and a tendency to become purple at the edges. There is a broad orange margin to the mantle. The gills have translucent bases and orange pigment on the outer surfaces. The rhinophores are translucent white, with two bands of orange.

This species can reach a total length of at least 35 mm.

== Etymology ==
This species was named in honor of Yara Tibiriçá, who has greatly contributed to the advance of nudibranch research in the western Indian Ocean
