= Hypselodoris alboterminata =

Scientific classification
- Kingdom: Animalia
- Phylum: Mollusca
- Class: Gastropoda
- Order: Nudibranchia
- Family: Chromodorididae
- Genus: Hypselodoris
- Species: H. alboterminata

Binomial name
- Hypselodoris alboterminata Gosliner & Johnson, 1999

Species of gastropod

Hypselodoris alboterminata is a species of sea slug or dorid nudibranch, a marine gastropod mollusk in the family Chromodorididae.

== Distribution ==
This nudibranch is known only from the Hawaiian islands in the central Pacific Ocean.

== Description ==
Hypselodoris alboterminata has a yellow to white body with 2 to 3 pinkish-purple longitudinal lines running along its body and upper dorsum. The anterior and posterior ends of the mantle are marked with white spots. The gills and rhinophores are white, lined with red bands or stripes.

This species can reach a total length of at least 15 mm.
