= Hypselodoris lacteola =

Scientific classification
- Kingdom: Animalia
- Phylum: Mollusca
- Class: Gastropoda
- Order: Nudibranchia
- Family: Chromodorididae
- Genus: Hypselodoris
- Species: H. lacteola

Binomial name
- Hypselodoris lacteola Rudman, 1995

Species of gastropod

Hypselodoris lacteola is a species of sea slug or dorid nudibranch, a marine gastropod mollusk in the family Chromodorididae.

== Distribution ==
This nudibranch is known only from New Caledonia in the Southern Pacific Ocean.

== Description ==
Hypselodoris lacteola has a white body and mantle and a purple tip to the foot. It has white gills and rhinophores outlined with purple. This species can reach a total length of at least 40 mm (1.6 in).
