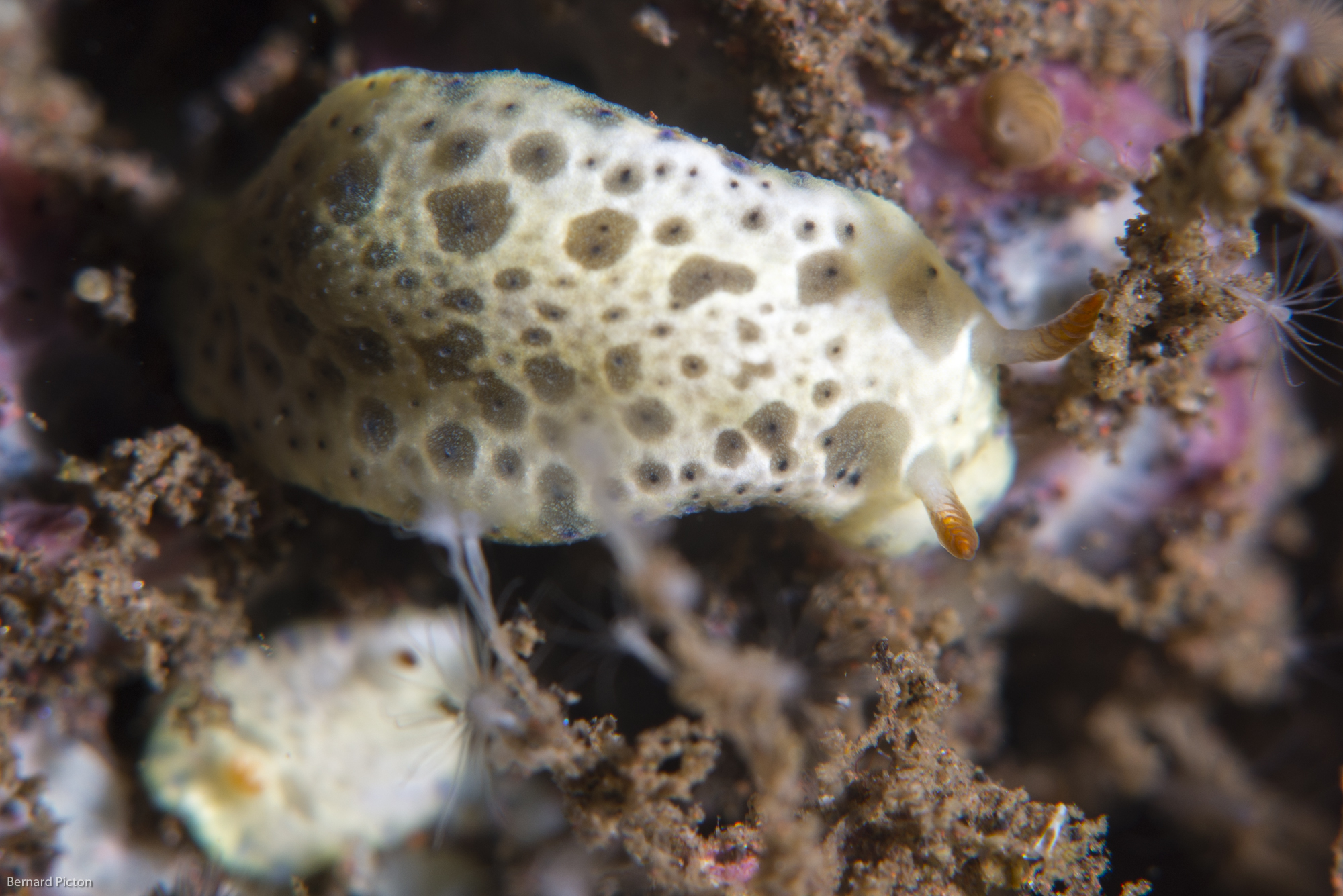
- Tulamben, Bali.

Scientific classification
- Kingdom: Animalia
- Phylum: Mollusca
- Class: Gastropoda
- Order: Nudibranchia
- Family: Chromodorididae
- Genus: Hypselodoris
- Species: H. lacuna

Binomial name
- Hypselodoris lacuna Gosliner & Johnson, 2018

= Hypselodoris lacuna =

Species of gastropod

Hypselodoris lacuna is a species of sea slug or dorid nudibranch, a marine gastropod mollusc in the family Chromodorididae.

== Distribution ==
This nudibranch was described from Tingloy, Batangas, Luzon, Philippines, 13.67329°N 120.84093°E. It is reported from the western Indian Ocean of Aldabra Atoll to the western Pacific of Vanuatu, Indonesia, Papua New Guinea, the Philippines and Japan.

== Description ==
Hypselodoris lacuna has an opaque white body with round transparent patches centred with black or grey spots. At the edge of the mantle there are small blue-grey spots. The gills have orange pigment lines on the outer face. The rhinophores have orange-brown clubs and translucent bases. This species can reach a total length of at least 12 mm.
