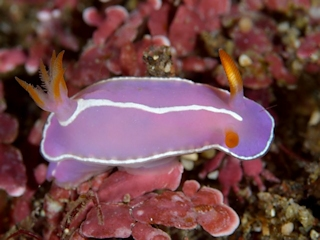

Scientific classification
- Kingdom: Animalia
- Phylum: Mollusca
- Class: Gastropoda
- Order: Nudibranchia
- Family: Chromodorididae
- Genus: Hypselodoris
- Species: H. shimodaensis

Binomial name
- Hypselodoris shimodaensis Baba, 1994

= Hypselodoris shimodaensis =

Species of gastropod

Hypselodoris shimodaensis is a species of colourful sea slug or dorid nudibranch, a marine gastropod mollusk in the family Chromodorididae.

== Distribution ==
This species is known from Japan.

== Description ==
Hypselodoris shimodaensis has a pale pink-purple mantle and body with a white line down the middle of the back and a white margin to the mantle. The mid-dorsal line stops between the rhinophores at the front and encircles the gill pocket at the back. There is a white line along the top of the foot which extends behind the mantle. The rhinophore clubs are orange with purple bases and the outer two-thirds of the gill leaves are orange.
