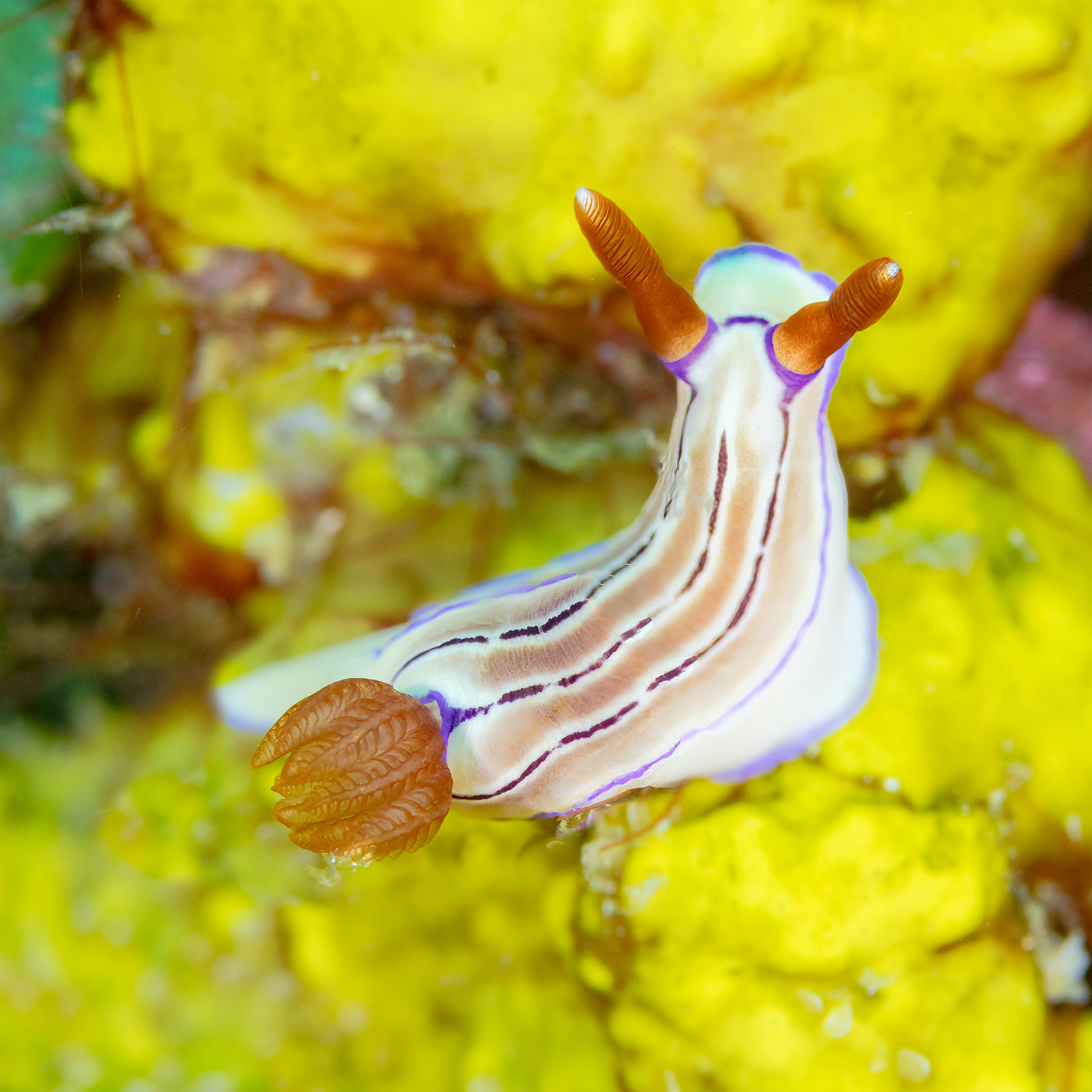

Scientific classification
- Kingdom: Animalia
- Phylum: Mollusca
- Class: Gastropoda
- Order: Nudibranchia
- Family: Chromodorididae
- Genus: Hypselodoris
- Species: H. emma

Binomial name
- Hypselodoris emma (Rudman, 1977)

= Hypselodoris emma =

Species of gastropod

Hypselodoris emma is a species of sea slug or dorid nudibranch, a marine gastropod mollusk in the family Chromodorididae.

== Distribution ==
This nudibranch is found throughout the tropical Indo Pacific Ocean.

== Description ==
Hypselodoris emma has a pale-yellow body and a purplish-blue mantle edge and foot. There are typically three purple lines interspersed with diffuse brown patches, running longitudinally down the length of the dorsum. The gills and rhinophores are reddish brown. This species is outwardly very similar in appearance to Hypselodoris maridadilus and Hypselodoris whitei. Hypselodoris emma can reach a total length of at least 40 mm and has been observed feeding on sponges from the genus Dysidea.
