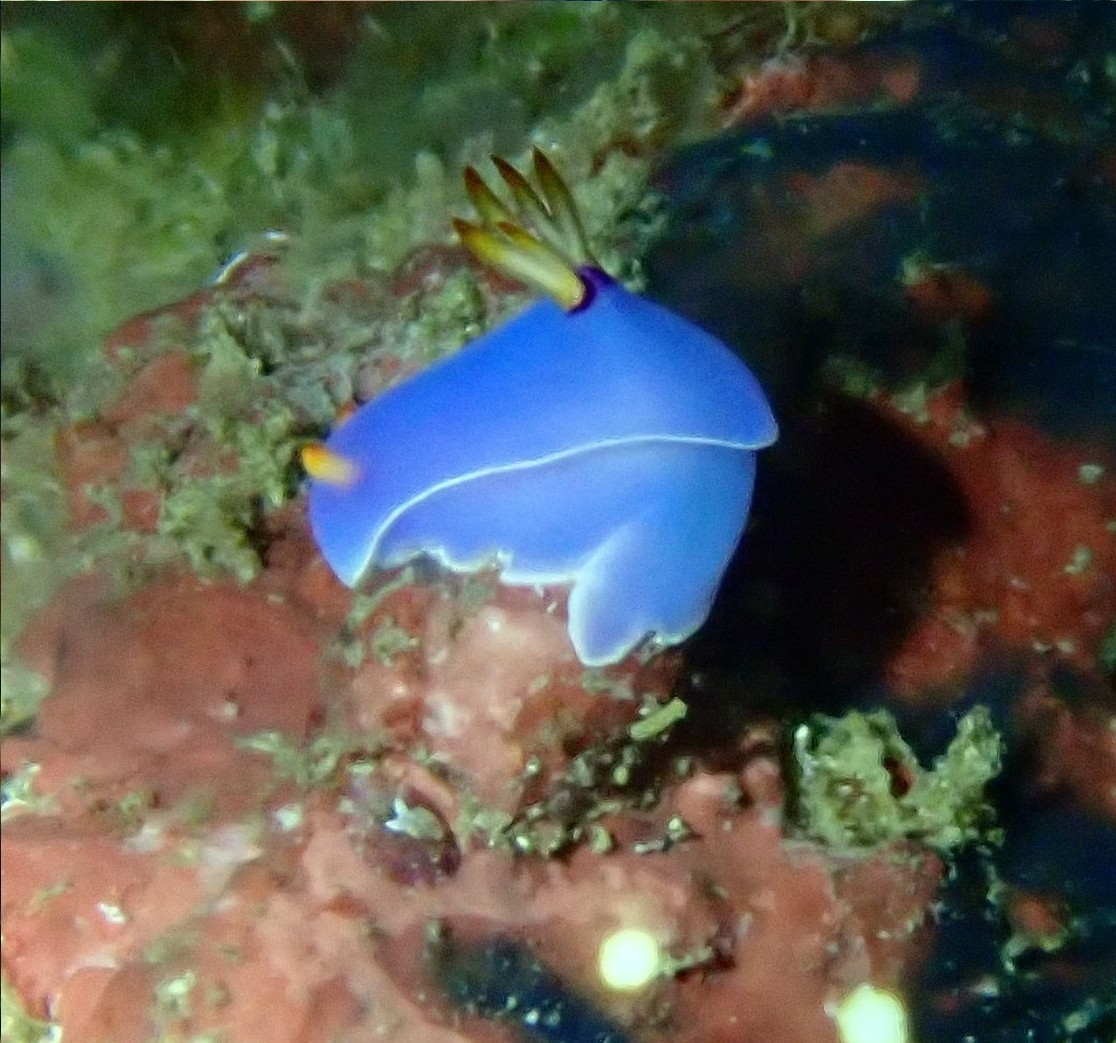

Scientific classification
- Kingdom: Animalia
- Phylum: Mollusca
- Class: Gastropoda
- Order: Nudibranchia
- Family: Chromodorididae
- Genus: Hypselodoris
- Species: H. melanesica

Binomial name
- Hypselodoris melanesica Gosliner & Johnson, 2018

= Hypselodoris melanesica =

Species of gastropod

Hypselodoris melanesica is a species of sea slug or dorid nudibranch, a marine gastropod mollusc in the family Chromodorididae.

== Distribution ==
This nudibranch was described from Southern Sek Island, Madang Lagoon, Madang, Papua New Guinea, 5.0985°S 145.8210°E. It is known only from Papua New Guinea and the Solomon Islands.

== Description ==
Hypselodoris melanesica has a translucent pale purple body with a thin white band at the edge of the mantle. The gills are light orange, becoming darker orange at the base. The gill pocket is deep violet. The rhinophores have bright orange clubs and a deep purple sheath at the base. This species can reach a total length of at least 30 mm.
