= Hypselodoris insulana =

Scientific classification
- Kingdom: Animalia
- Phylum: Mollusca
- Class: Gastropoda
- Order: Nudibranchia
- Family: Chromodorididae
- Genus: Hypselodoris
- Species: H. insulana

Binomial name
- Hypselodoris insulana Gosliner & Johnson, 1999

Species of gastropod

Hypselodoris insulana is a species of sea slug or dorid nudibranch, a marine gastropod mollusk in the family Chromodorididae.

== Distribution ==
This nudibranch is found in the Northwestern Hawaiian Islands of Midway and Kure Atoll in the central Pacific Ocean.

== Description ==
Hypselodoris insulana has an off-white or brown coloured body and a bright purple mantle edge and foot. There are white longitudinal lines on its dorsum. The gills and rhinophores are white, lined with orange bands. This species can reach a total length of at least 50 mm (2.0 in).
