= Hypselodoris rositoi =

Scientific classification
- Kingdom: Animalia
- Phylum: Mollusca
- Class: Gastropoda
- Order: Nudibranchia
- Family: Chromodorididae
- Genus: Hypselodoris
- Species: H. rositoi

Binomial name
- Hypselodoris rositoi Gosliner & Johnson, 2018

Species of gastropod

Hypselodoris rositoi is a species of sea slug or dorid nudibranch, a marine gastropod mollusc in the family Chromodorididae.

== Distribution ==
This nudibranch was described from Malajibomanoc (Chicken Feather Island), Batangas Bay, Luzon Island, Philippines, 13.628°N 120.966°E. It is known only from the Philippines.

== Description ==
Hypselodoris rositoi has a pink body with a white border to the mantle and foot. The rhinophores are orange, with pink-purple sheaths.

This species is large, reaching 50–60 mm in length.
