= Hypselodoris perii =

Scientific classification
- Kingdom: Animalia
- Phylum: Mollusca
- Class: Gastropoda
- Order: Nudibranchia
- Family: Chromodorididae
- Genus: Hypselodoris
- Species: H. perii

Binomial name
- Hypselodoris perii Gosliner & Johnson, 2018

Species of gastropod

Hypselodoris perii is a species of sea slug or dorid nudibranch, a marine gastropod mollusc in the family Chromodorididae.

== Distribution ==
This nudibranch was described from Mainit Bubbles, Mabini, Batangas, Luzon Island, Philippines, 13.6880278°N 120.95809°E. It is also known from Bali, Indonesia.

== Description ==
Hypselodoris perii has a white body with elongate wine red spots and lines and an orange-yellow border to the mantle. The wine-red spots at the edge of the mantle are bordered by diffuse purple pigment and this colour is suffused over the mantle. The gills are off white, with orange on the outer faces. The rhinophores are orange, with white between the lamellae. The colour pattern is similar to Noumea catalai and strikingly different to other species of Hypselodoris.

This species is large, reaching 35 mm in length.
