= Risbecia nyalya =

Scientific classification
- Kingdom: Animalia
- Phylum: Mollusca
- Class: Gastropoda
- Order: Nudibranchia
- Family: Chromodorididae
- Genus: Risbecia
- Species: R. nyalya

Binomial name
- Risbecia nyalya (Er. Marcus & Ev. Marcus, 1967)

Synonyms
- Chromodoris nyalya Ev. Marcus & Er. Marcus, 1967 (Basionym); Hypselodoris nyalya (Ev. Marcus & Er. Marcus, 1967)

Species of gastropod

Risbecia nyalya is a species of colourful sea slug or dorid nudibranch, a marine gastropod mollusk in the family Chromodorididae.

== Distribution ==
This nudibranch is found in the Caribbean.

== Description ==
Risbecia nyalya has a blue or purple body with a white and orange-yellow lined mantle. The gills and rhinophores are purple or blue.

The maximum recorded length is 35 mm.

== Habitat ==
Minimum recorded depth is 2 m. Maximum recorded depth is 7 m.

It feeds on sponges.
