= Felimare muniainae =

Scientific classification
- Kingdom: Animalia
- Phylum: Mollusca
- Class: Gastropoda
- Order: Nudibranchia
- Family: Chromodorididae
- Genus: Felimare
- Species: F. muniainae

Binomial name
- Felimare muniainae (Ortea, Valdés & García-Gómez, 1996)

Synonyms
- Hypselodoris muniaini Ortea & Valdés, 1996 (basionym incorrect gender of name)

Species of gastropod

Felimare muniainae is a species of colourful sea slug or dorid nudibranch, a marine gastropod mollusc in the family Chromodorididae.

== Distribution ==
This species was described from Santo Antonio, Isla de Príncipe, Gulf of Guinea in the Atlantic Ocean.
