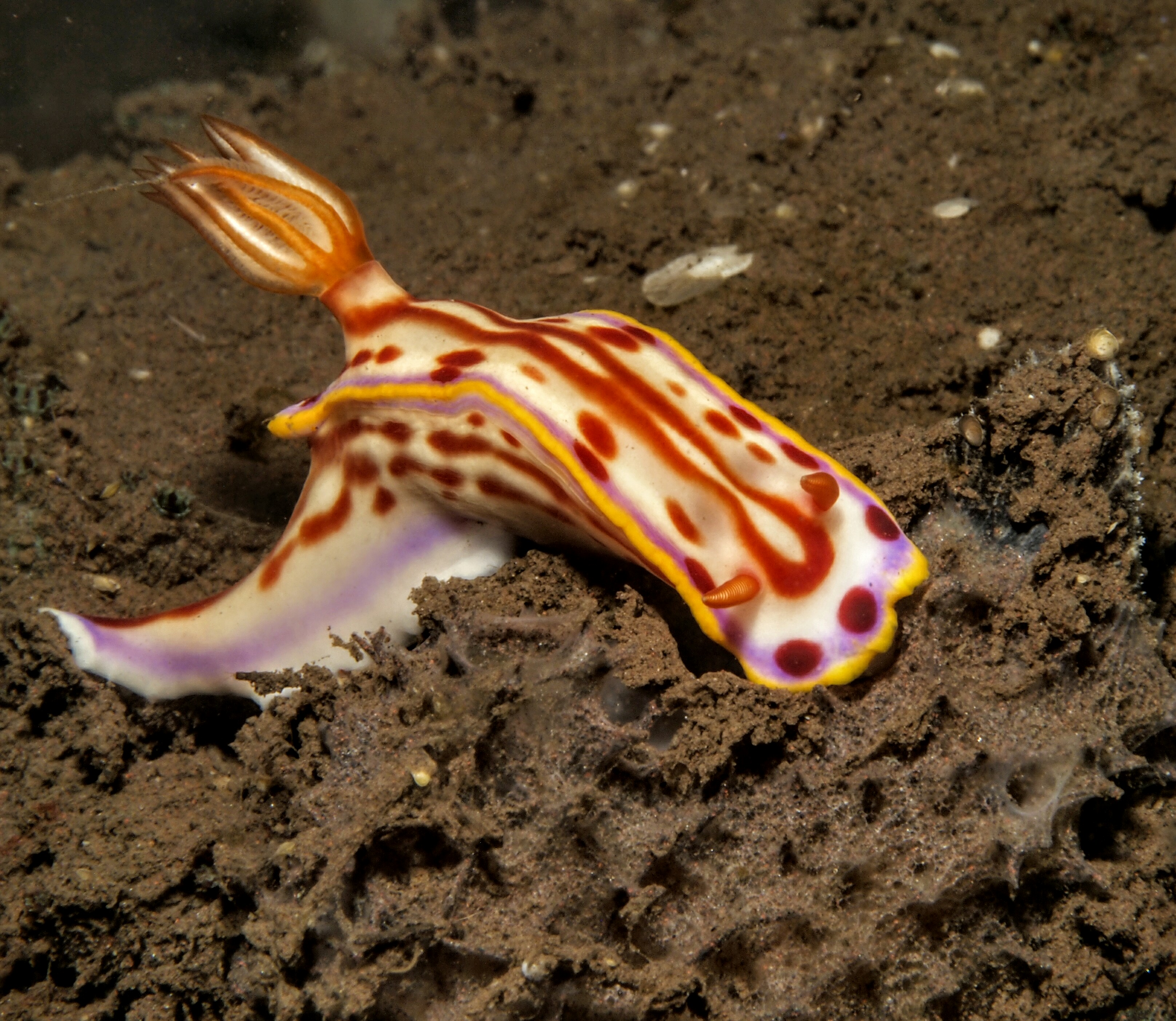

Scientific classification
- Kingdom: Animalia
- Phylum: Mollusca
- Class: Gastropoda
- Order: Nudibranchia
- Family: Chromodorididae
- Genus: Hypselodoris
- Species: H. kaname

Binomial name
- Hypselodoris kaname Baba, 1995

Synonyms
- Hypselodoris koumacensis Rudman, 1995

= Hypselodoris kaname =

Species of gastropod

Hypselodoris kaname is a species of sea slug or dorid nudibranch, a marine gastropod mollusk in the family Chromodorididae.

== Distribution ==
This nudibranch is found in the Western Pacific Ocean from Japan to New Zealand.

== Description ==
Hypselodoris kaname has a creamy-white body and a yellow-edged mantle. There are longitudinal red lines and spots all over the body, and purplish spots on the upper dorsum at the anterior end. The gills and rhinophores are bright red. This species can reach a total length of at least 45 mm. It has been observed feeding on grey sponges from the genus Dysidea.
