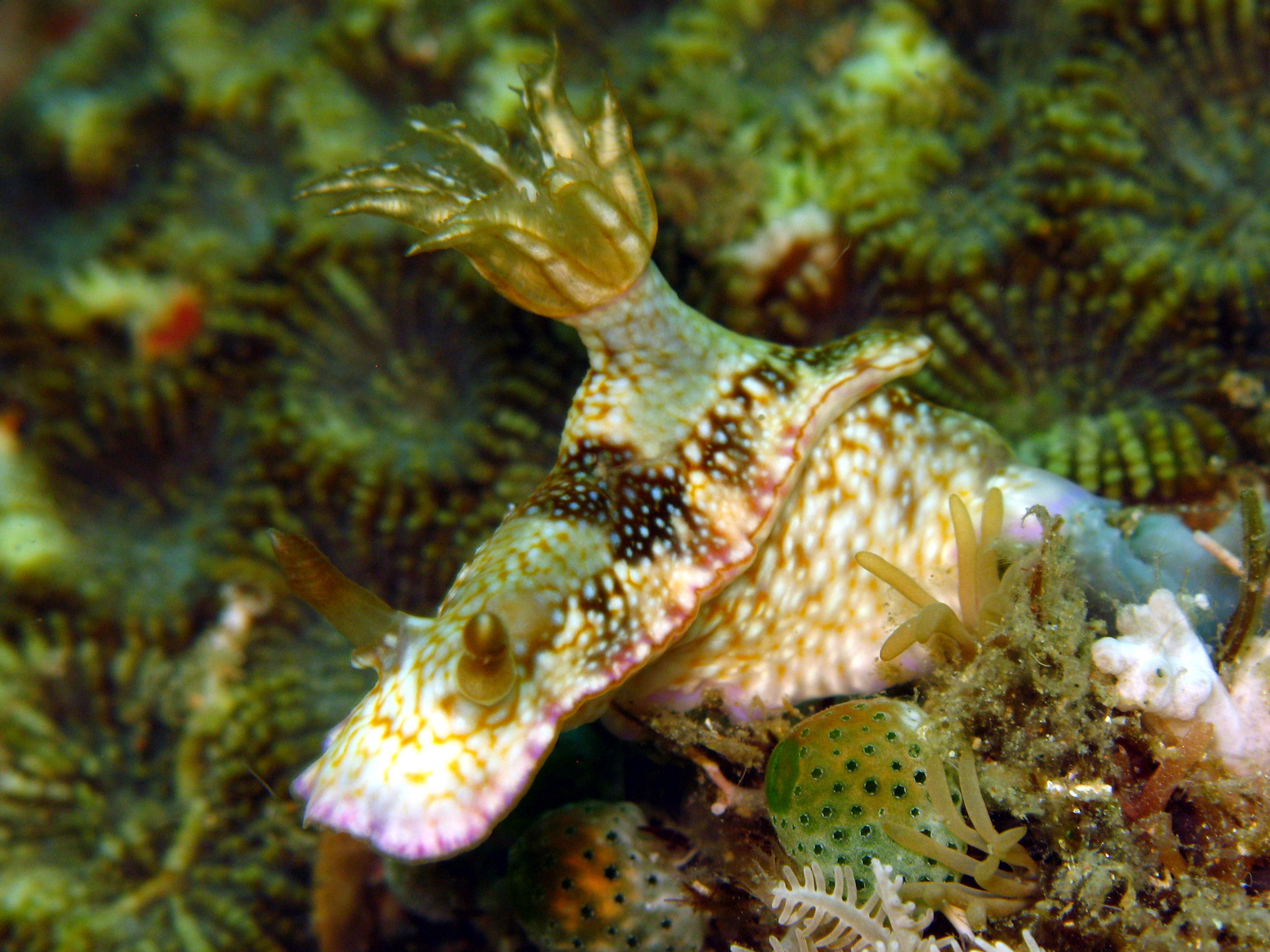

Scientific classification
- Kingdom: Animalia
- Phylum: Mollusca
- Class: Gastropoda
- Order: Nudibranchia
- Family: Chromodorididae
- Genus: Hypselodoris
- Species: H. reidi

Binomial name
- Hypselodoris reidi Gosliner & Johnson, 1999

= Hypselodoris reidi =

Species of gastropod

Hypselodoris reidi is a species of sea slug or dorid nudibranch, a marine gastropod mollusk in the family Chromodorididae.

== Distribution ==
This nudibranch is known to range from Luzon in the Philippines to Sulawesi in Indonesia.

== Description ==
Hypselodoris reidi has a cream-to-white body with white raised spots covering its dorsum. The gills and rhinophores are a pale straw-yellow colour. There are sometimes pale-purple or brown colourations on the body.

This species can reach a total length of at least 50 mm. It is similar in anatomy to Hypselodoris jacksoni and Hypselodoris krakatoa. Genetic evidence suggests that Hypselodoris lacuna, Hypselodoris regina, Hypselodoris krakatoa, Hypselodoris cerisae, Hypselodoris jacksoni, Hypselodoris reidi and Hypselodoris iba are a closely related group of species.
