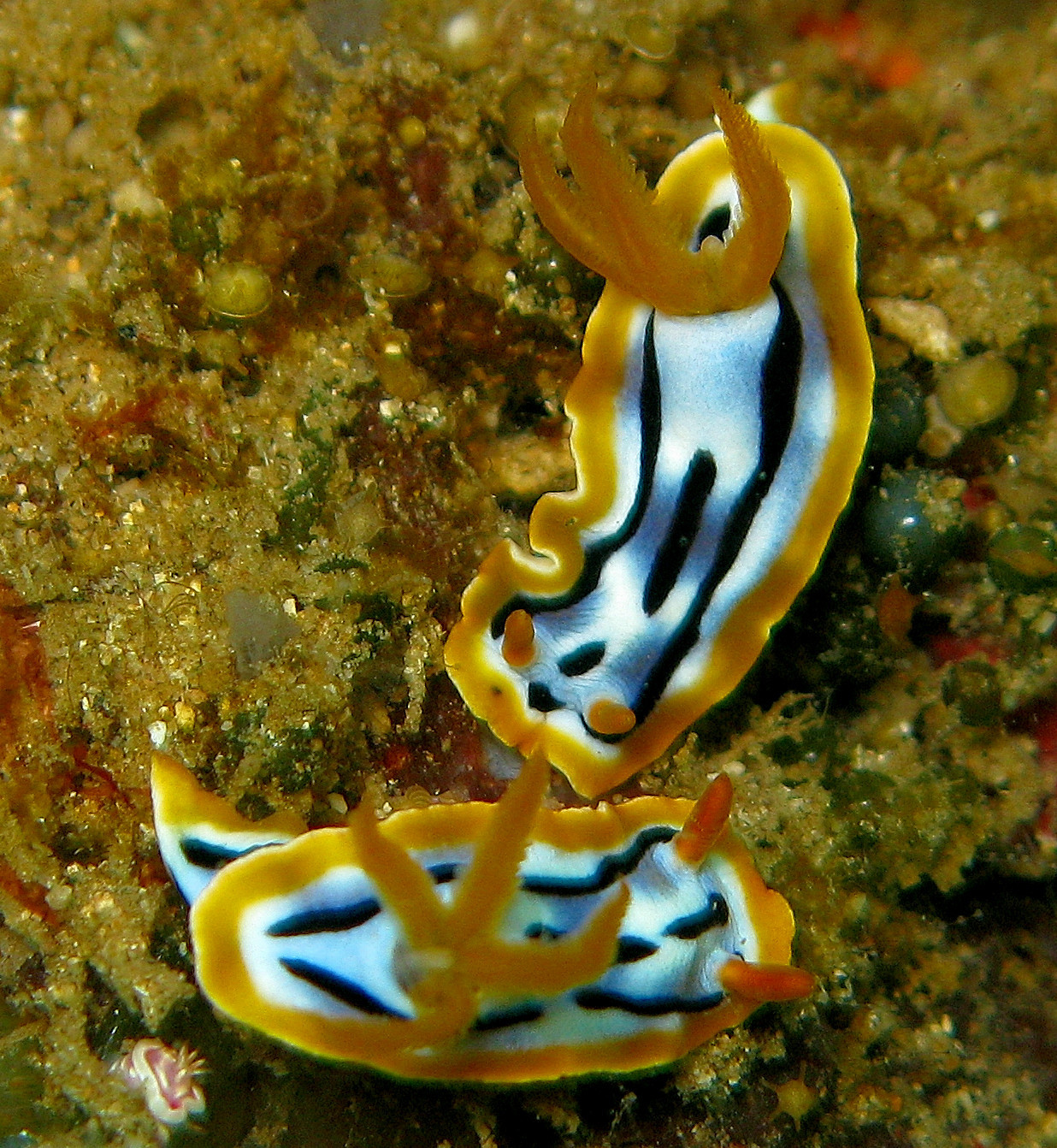
- A pair of Chromodoris strigata

Scientific classification
- Kingdom: Animalia
- Phylum: Mollusca
- Class: Gastropoda
- Order: Nudibranchia
- Family: Chromodorididae
- Genus: Chromodoris
- Species: C. strigata

Binomial name
- Chromodoris strigata Rudman, 1982

= Chromodoris strigata =

Species of mollusc

Chromodoris strigata, commonly known as the streaked chromodoris, is a species of colourful sea slug, a dorid nudibranch, a marine gastropod mollusc in the family Chromodorididae.

== Distribution ==
This species occurs in the tropical Indo-West Pacific Ocean. It has been observed in localities as far apart as Madagascar in Africa to the Great Barrier Reef in Australia.

== Description ==
Chromodoris strigata is pale blue with black longitudinal lines on its body and upper mantle. It has a bright orange-edged mantle and bright orange gills and rhinophores. This species is easily confused with Chromodoris elisabethina but has a distinctive darker area in the middle of the back.

== Ecology ==
This species, like many other nudibranchs, feeds on sponges. It has been seen feeding on yellow sponges from the family Darwinellidae.
