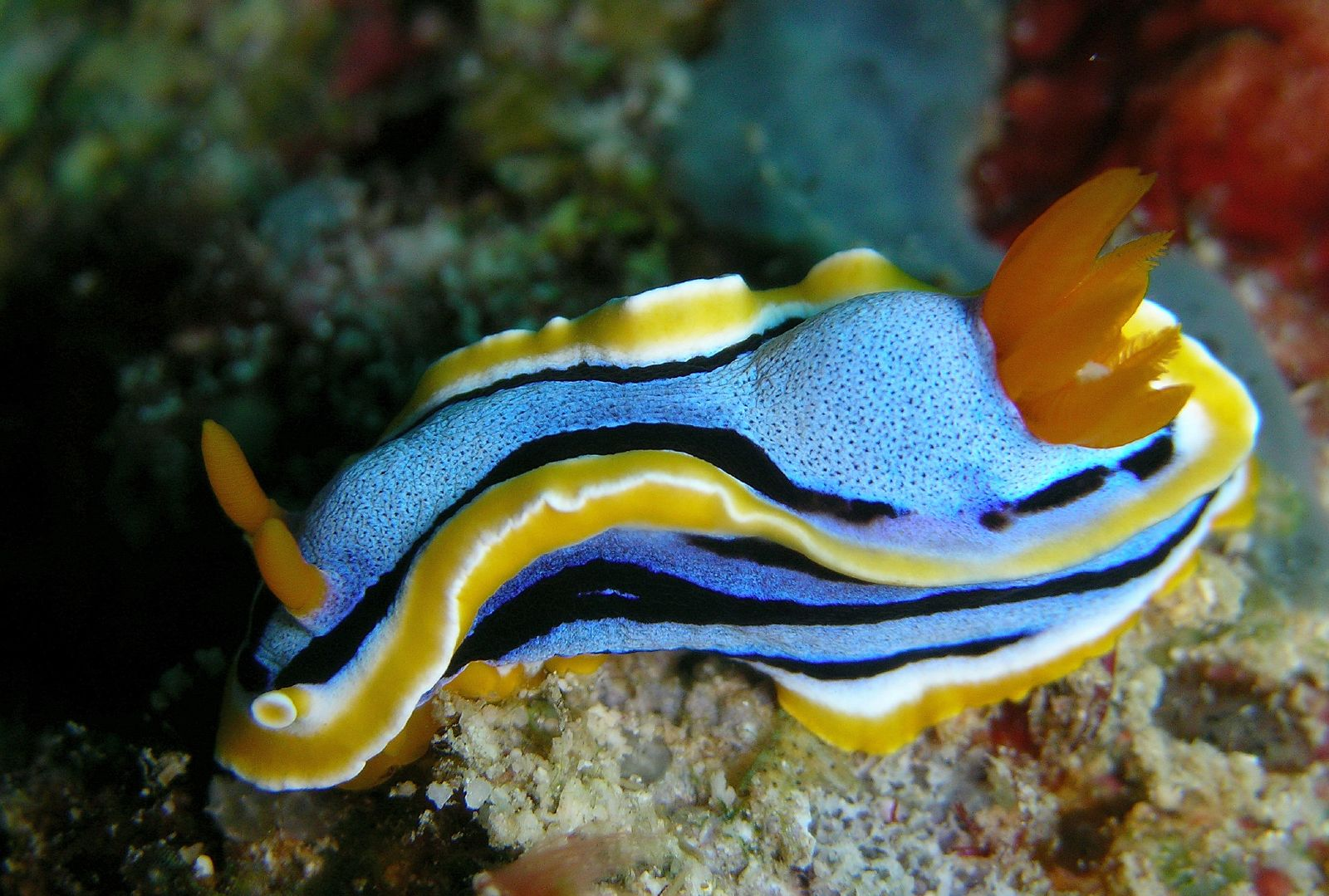

Scientific classification
- Kingdom: Animalia
- Phylum: Mollusca
- Class: Gastropoda
- Order: Nudibranchia
- Family: Chromodorididae
- Genus: Chromodoris
- Species: C. annae

Binomial name
- Chromodoris annae Bergh, 1877

= Chromodoris annae =

Species of gastropod

Chromodoris annae, also known as Anna's magnificent sea slug, is a species of sea slug in the family Chromodorididae.

== Distribution ==
This species of nudibranch is found in the central area of the Indo-Pacific region from Malaysia, Indonesia and the Philippines to the Marshall Islands. The Indo-Pacific region that Chromodoris annae can be found in is rich in biodiversity. This is a tropical region made up of shallow waters and expanses of coastal shoreline. It is teeming with many different coral reefs, mangroves, and seagrasses. During the day, the nudibranch is typically found alone within coral reefs. Chromodoris annae can reach depths of between 15–30 m (49–98 ft).

== Description ==
Chromodoris annae can reach a maximum size of 5 cm (2.0 in) length. The body is elongated, with a foot made distinguishable from the upper body by a skirt-like mantle that partially hides it. The branched gills and the rhinophores are orange to yellow. The main bodily color can be a variety of shades of blue, the intensity of the latter varying from blue-grey to intense blue, slightly speckled by tiny black spots. The blue dorsal side and the foot are bordered with a black line which can be discontinuous depending on the specimen. A black dash between the rhinophores distinguishes this species from similar species such as Chromodoris elisabethina and C. westraliensis. The mantle edge and the foot are bordered with white and orange to yellow lines in which the width and the color intensity can vary greatly from a specimen to another.

== Ecology ==
Chromodoris annae has a diet that consists of only one genus of sponges, the Petrosaspongia. This nudibranch specializes in these sponges, which are toxic to other potential predators. Chromodoris annae is able to absorb this compound and store it in glands that stretch around the mantle. These stored chemicals are unpleasant to some surrounding fish, allowing Chromodoris annae to avoid predation. Along with toxin sequestration, it is also believed that the vibrant coloration of Chromodoris annae could be considered aposematic and may be a visual deterrent for predators. Currently, the only predators of Chromodoris annae and others of the Chromodoris species are a carnivorous nudibranch genus Gymnodoris.

== Behavior ==
Generally, Chromodoris annae is a documented docile species of nudibranch. Despite the record of non-aggression, there was one reported case of intraspecific aggression between two Chromodoris annae sea slugs. Both nudibranchs were using a foot to keep them attached to the substrate below, but they were intertwined one on top of the other. They would lunge at each other, presenting their buccal mass and radula in repeated rasping cycles. After some time, the fighting continued with both nudibranchs circling around each other, remaining in close contact and continuing the few second rasping cycles. At one point, one nudibranch reared up and over the other, coming down over the top with its exposed radula. The biting attacks appeared to be targeted, aiming for the head, mantle, and the gills. After some time, both Chromodoris annae specimens moved out of contact with one another. Both of the individuals sustained some minor damage to their mantle.

== Reproduction ==
Chromodoris annae is a planar spawning species, meaning that this nudibranch lays a flat, two-dimensional, egg mass. Chromodoris annae lays egg masses in an arrangement that begins in the center and works its way outward, creating a spiral formation. These eggs are somewhat translucent; however, this nudibranch has a cream-colored ovum, which can then give the egg masses a slight cream-colored hue. Each egg mass consists of approximately 3–4 whorls.

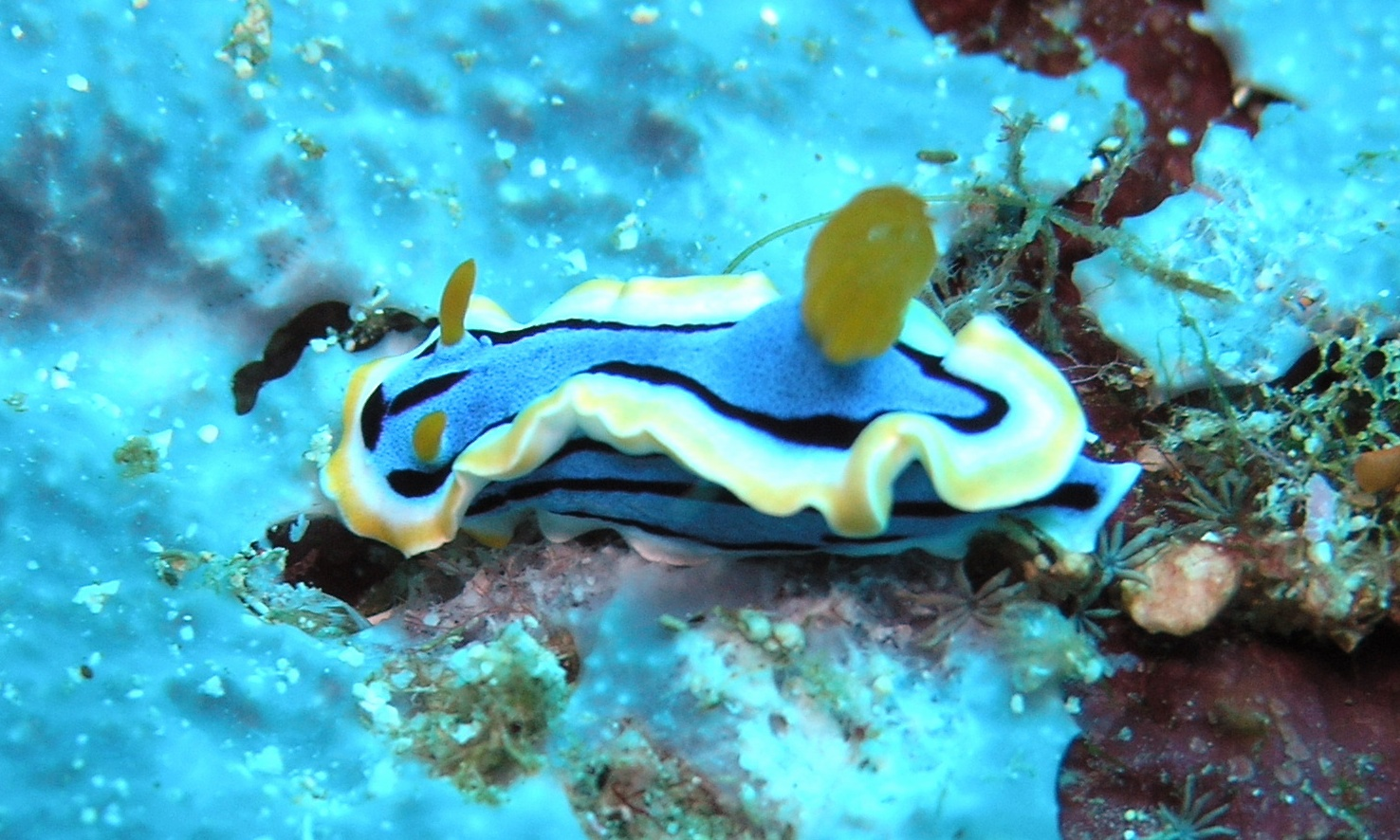
Chromodoris annae

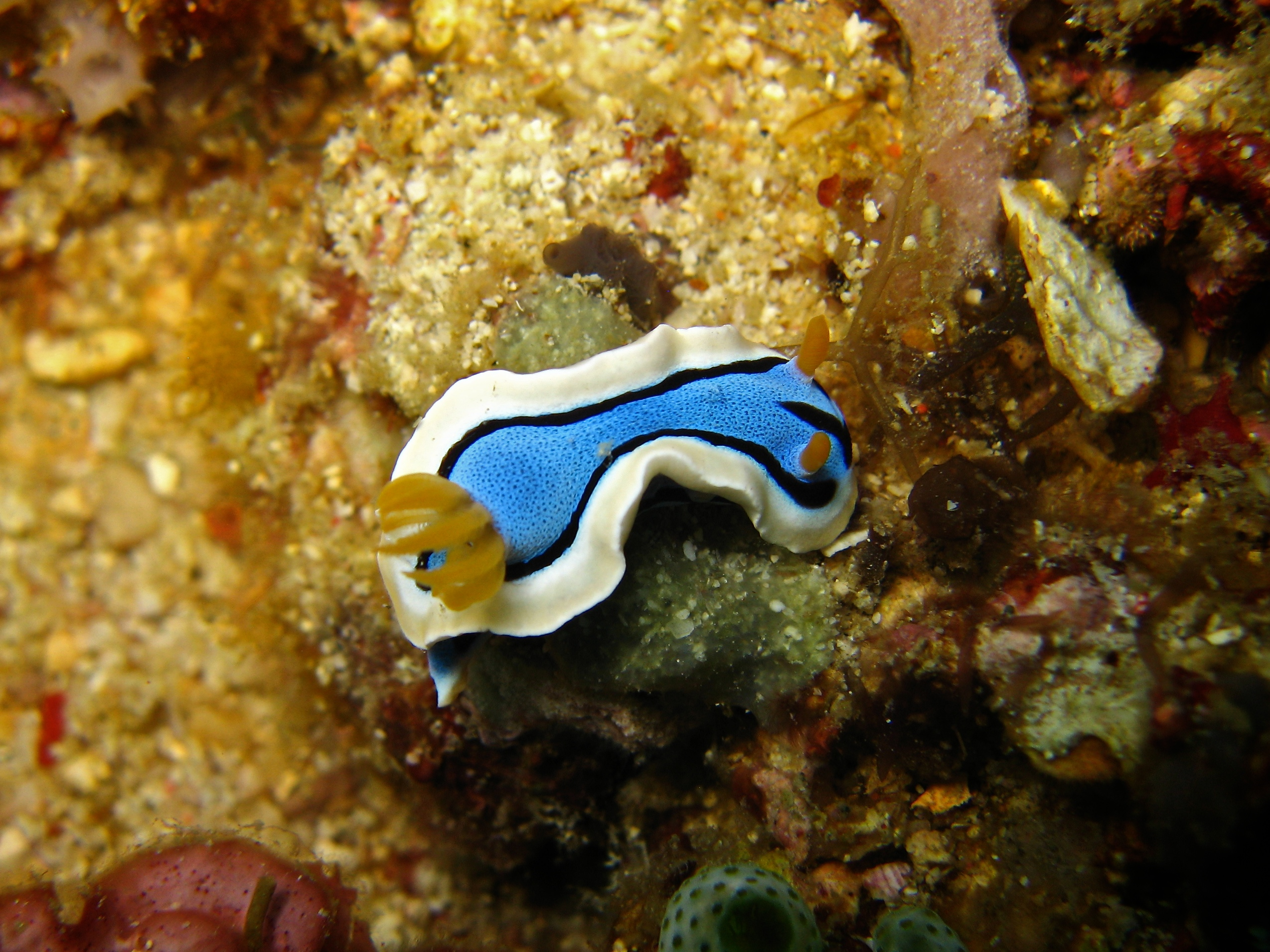
Chromodoris annae in the Philippines

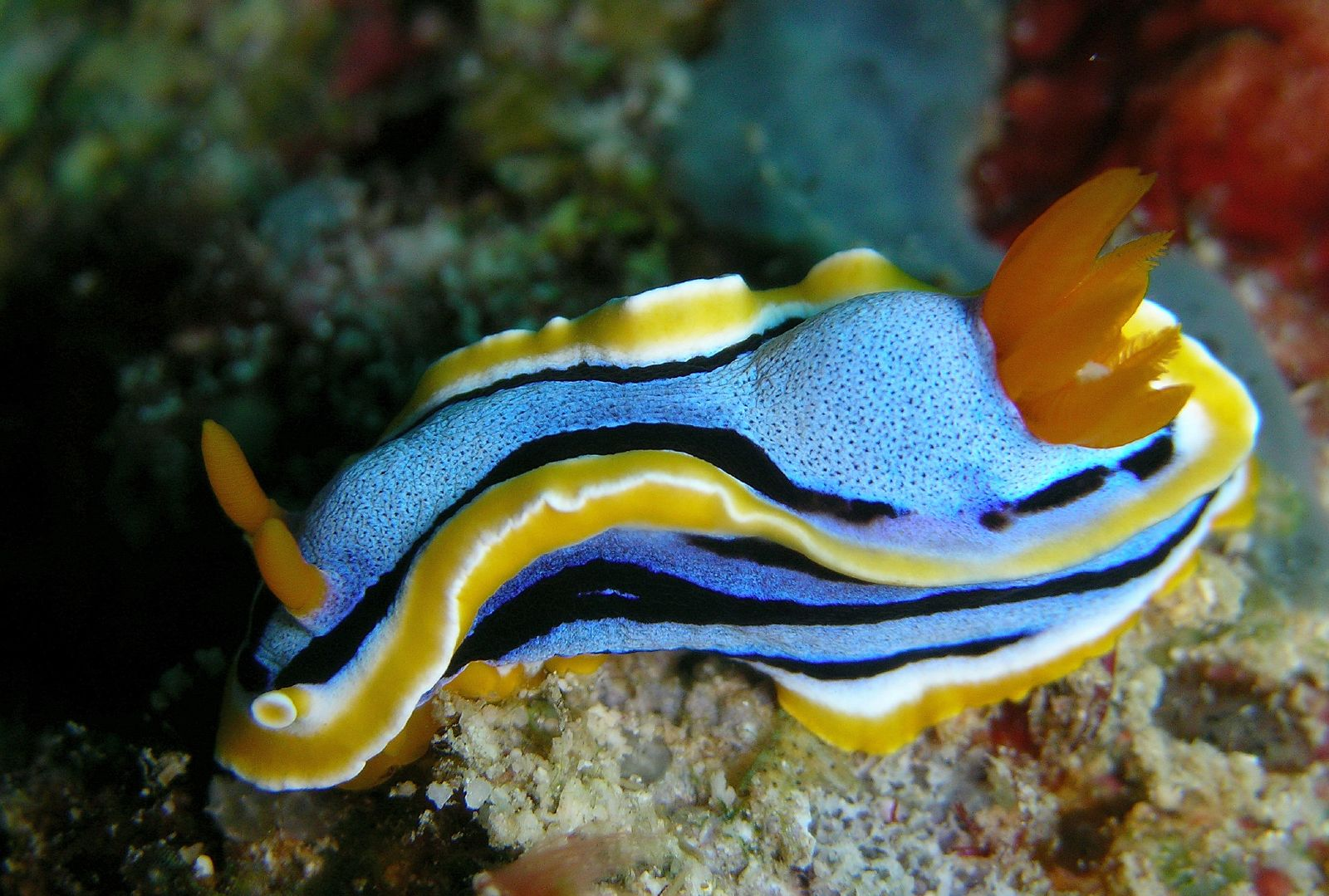
Chromodoris annae in Bunaken, Sulawesi

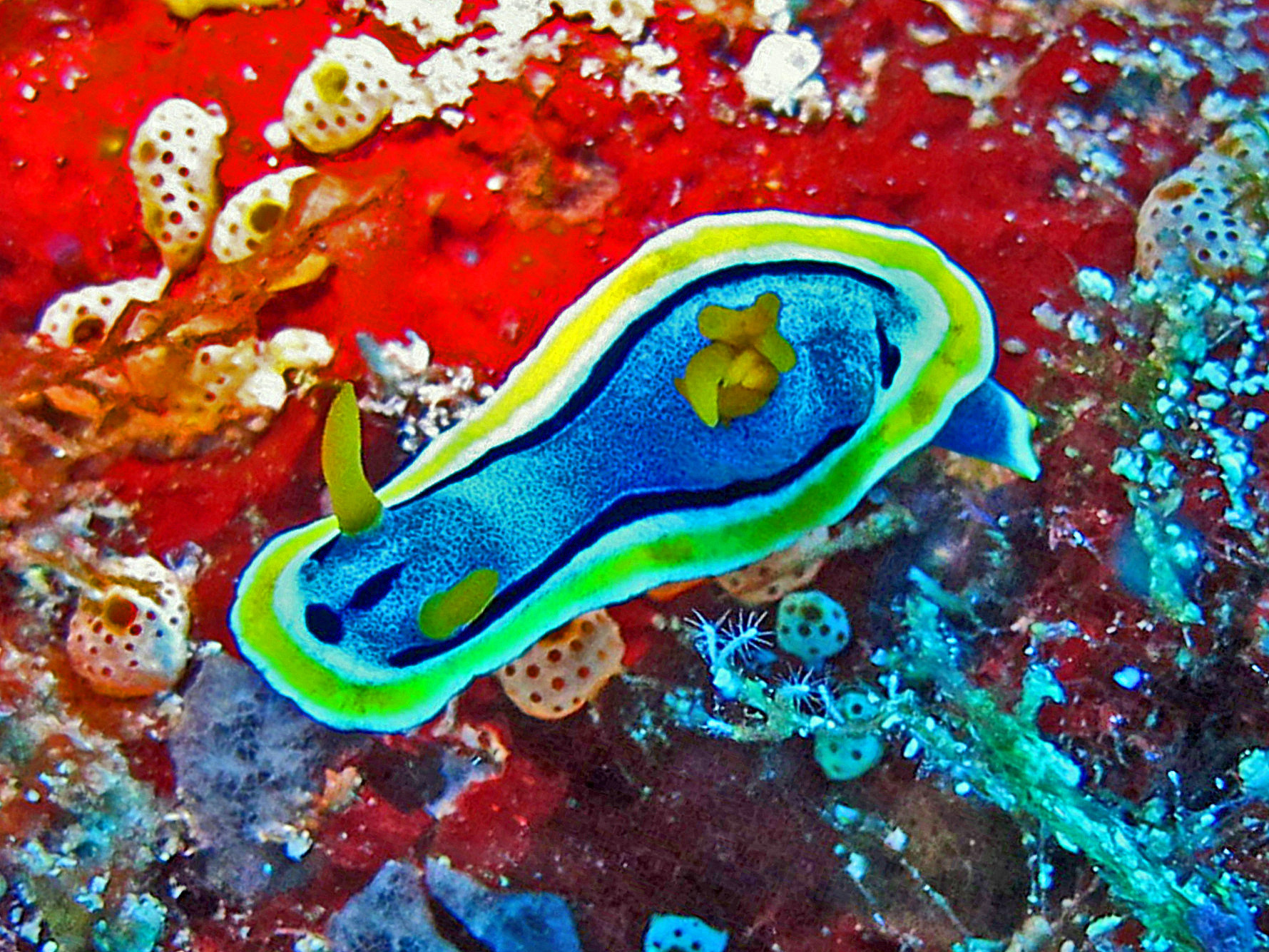
Chromodoris annae in Bunaken, Sulawesi

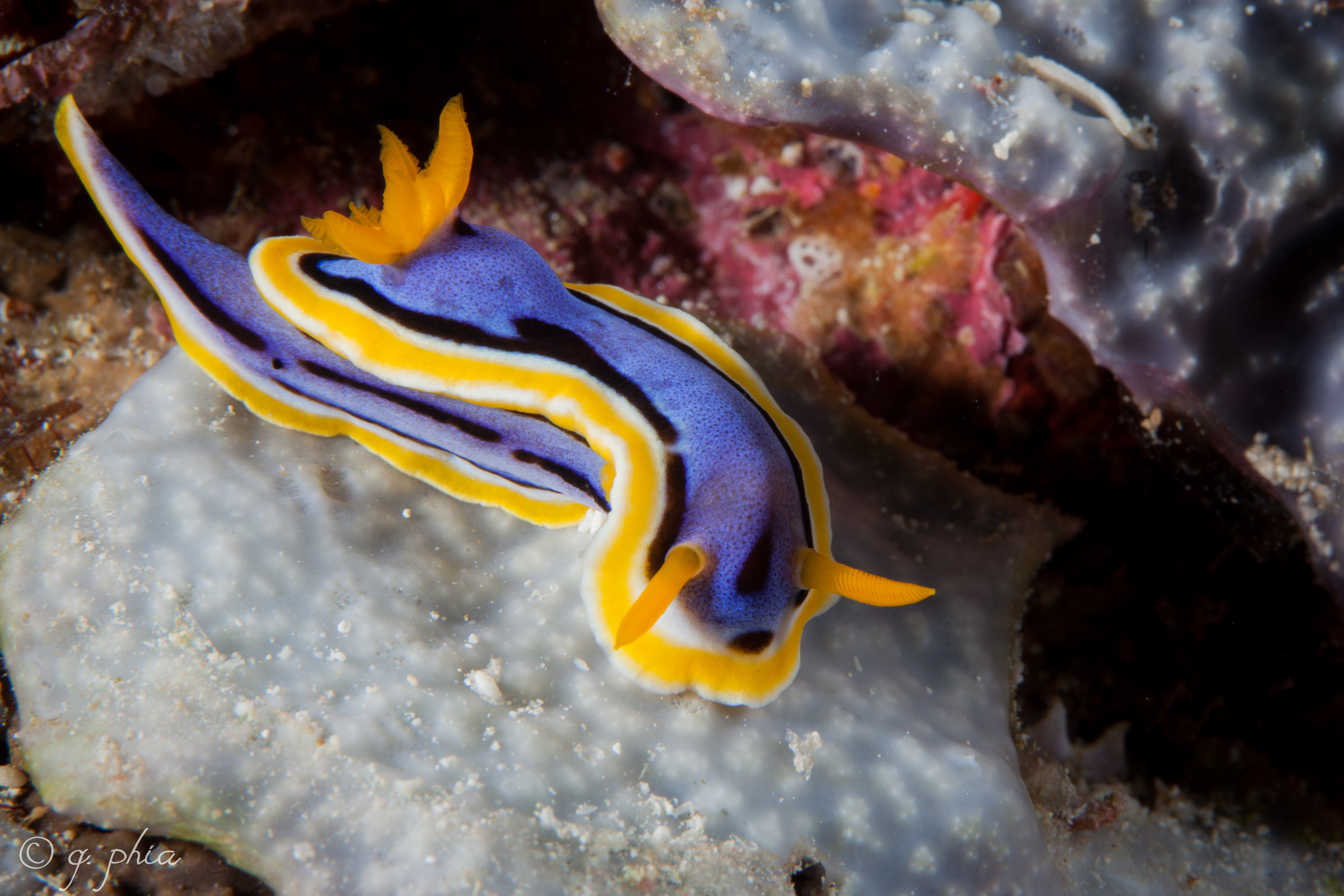
Chromodoris annae in Wakatobi National Park, Sulawesi, 2016

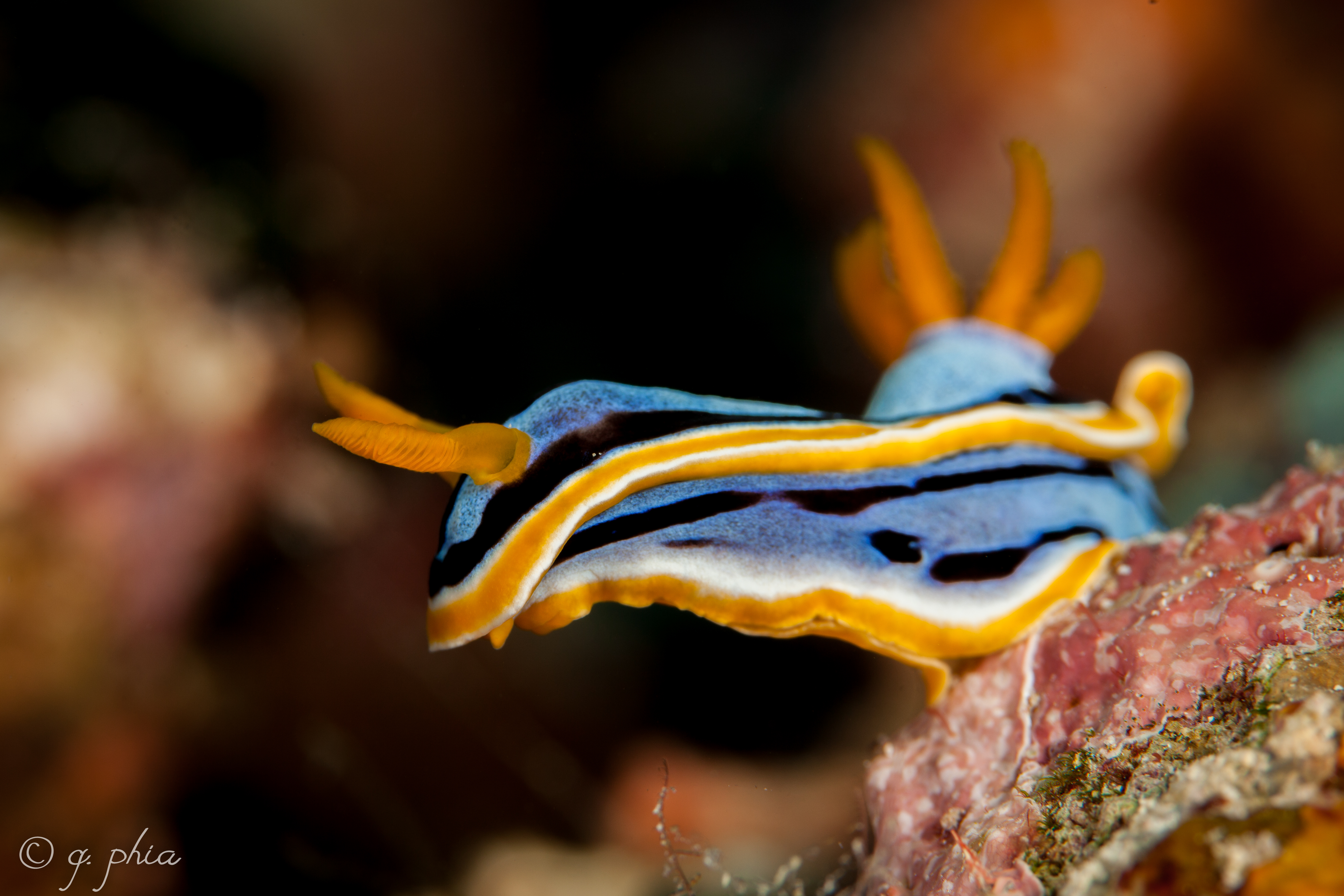
Chromodoris annae in Wakatobi National Park, Sulawesi, 2018

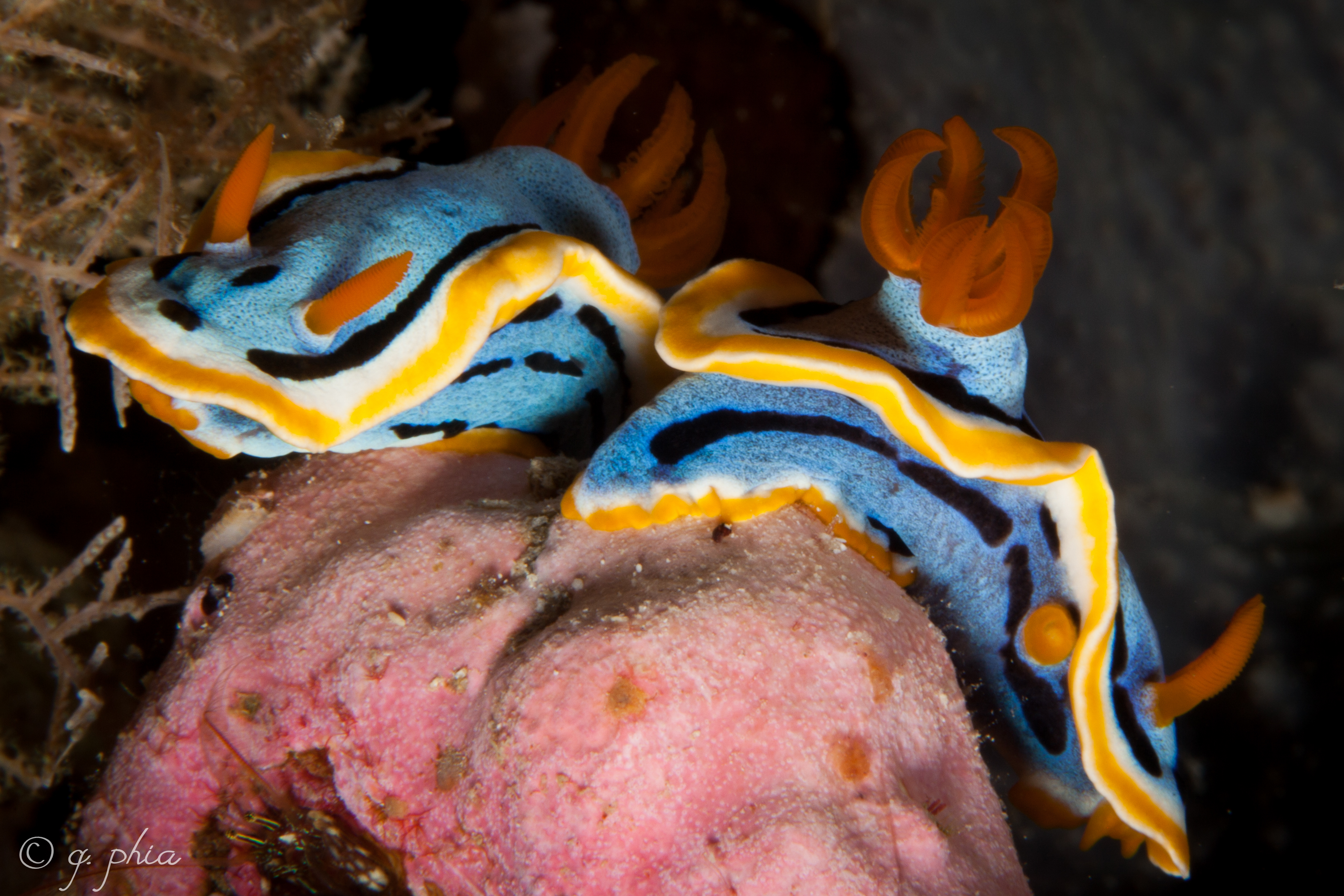
Chromodoris annae meeting in Wakatobi National Park, Sulawesi, 2018
