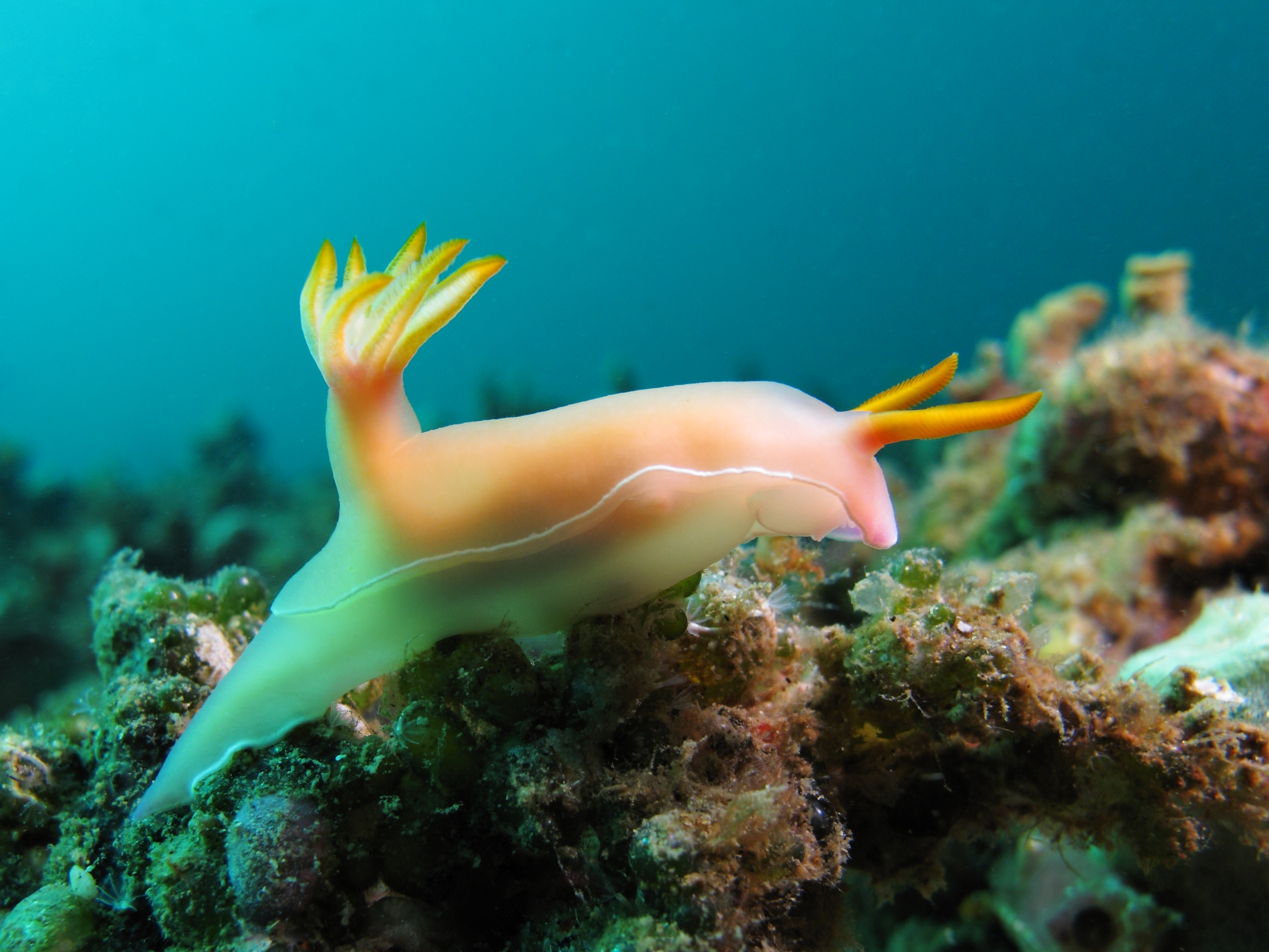
- Hypselodoris bullockii from Bima bay (Sumbawa, Indonesia)

Scientific classification
- Kingdom: Animalia
- Phylum: Mollusca
- Class: Gastropoda
- Order: Nudibranchia
- Family: Chromodorididae
- Genus: Hypselodoris
- Species: H. bullockii

Binomial name
- Hypselodoris bullockii (Collingwood, 1881)

Synonyms
- Chromodoris bullockii Collingwood, 1881 (basionym); Risbecia bullockii (Collingwood, 1881)

= Hypselodoris bullockii =

Species of gastropod

Hypselodoris bullockii is a species of colourful sea slug or dorid nudibranch, a marine gastropod mollusc in the family Chromodorididae.

Hypselodoris bullockii is quite pale purple in colour. It has been mistaken for a number of other species. These include the closely related species Hypselodoris variobranchia and Hypselodoris violacea as well as the unrelated species Hypselodoris iba. Hypselodoris apolegma, which looks similar to this species (and is distinguished by a reticulate pattern gradually merging in to the pinkish purple), was previously assumed to be possibly a different colour form of H. bullockii. However, molecular phylogenetic data confirm the distinction of the many species.

== Distribution ==
This nudibranch was described from a specimen measuring 70 mm (2.8 in) in length, dredged in 110 m (360 ft) at Recruit Island, Senkaku Islands, 150 miles NE of Taiwan, 25.922745°N 124.558247°E. It is currently identified with an animal which is widespread in shallow water in the central Indo-Pacific region. Many records are incorrect as it has now been shown that at least eight species have been confused under this name in the past. The H. bullockii clade contains seven species, plus H. iba is a mimic of H. bullocki. Six of these can be found in the Philippines. Hypselodoris apolegma is found throughout the western Pacific from Japan (Okinawa), the Philippines, Indonesia Malaysia (Sabah) whereas H. brycei, is found only in Western Australia (Houtman Abrolhos Islands to the Exmouth Region and Dampier Archipelago). Hypselodoris bullockii is considered to be widespread in the western and central Pacific, from Japan, Taiwan, Hong Kong, the Philippines, Indonesia, Malaysia, eastern Australia, the Marshall Islands and New Caledonia, whereas H. melanesica is known only from Papua New Guinea and the Solomon Islands, both of which are areas where H. bullockii is absent. Hypselodoris rositoi is apparently restricted to the northern Philippines and H. violacea is apparently restricted to Sabah, Malaysia and Palawan Island, Philippines. Hypselodoris variobranchia is apparently restricted to Japan (Okinawa), Taiwan, the Philippines, Malaysia, Indonesia and Queensland, Australia.

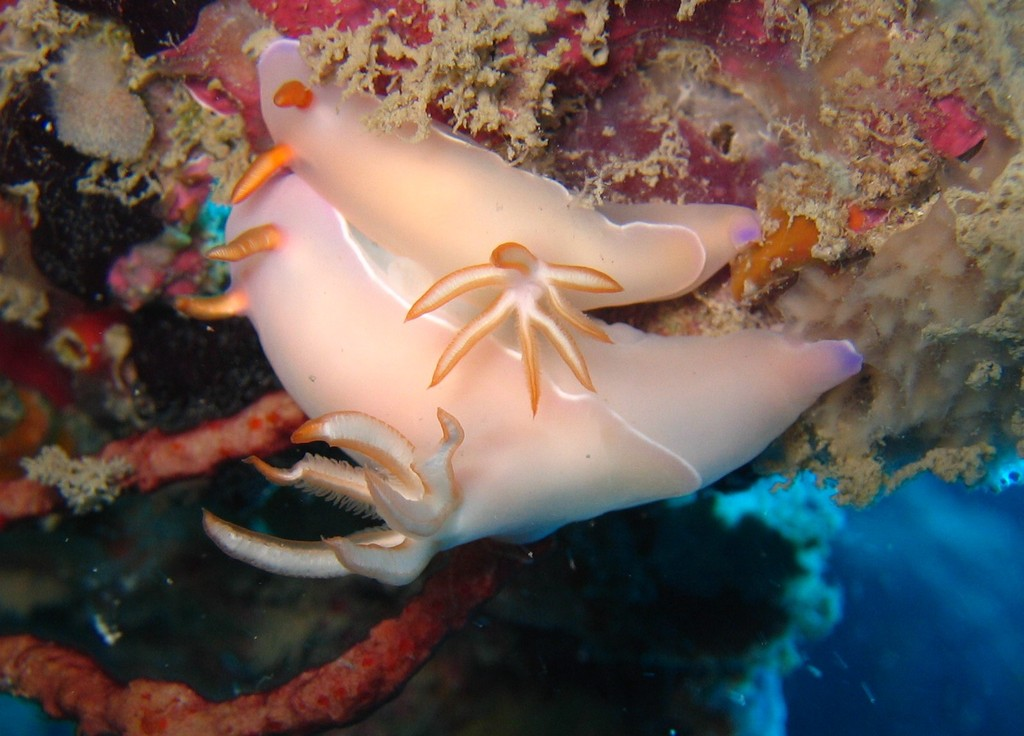
Two Hypselodoris bullockii of different sizes

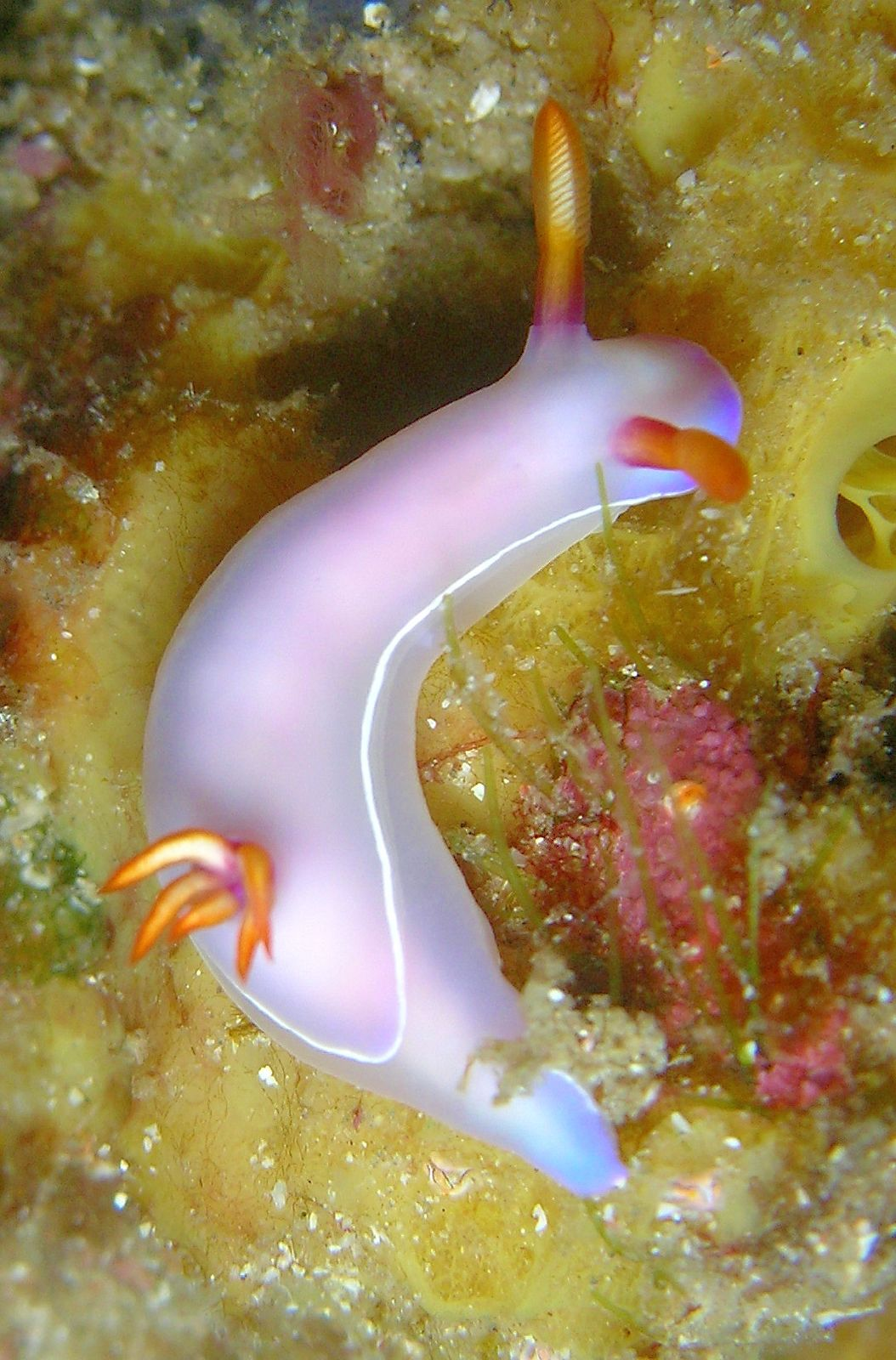
Hypselodoris bullockii
