= Hypselodoris variobranchia =

Scientific classification
- Kingdom: Animalia
- Phylum: Mollusca
- Class: Gastropoda
- Order: Nudibranchia
- Family: Chromodorididae
- Genus: Hypselodoris
- Species: H. variobranchia

Binomial name
- Hypselodoris variobranchia Gosliner & Johnson, 2018

Species of gastropod

Hypselodoris variobranchia is a species of sea slug or dorid nudibranch, a marine gastropod mollusc in the family Chromodorididae.

== Distribution ==
The holotype of this nudibranch was collected at 30 m depth from Aphol's Rock, Maricaban Island, Tingloy, Batangas Province, Luzon Island, Philippines, 13.6586°N 120.9013°E. It is a common and widespread species which has been reported from Queensland, Australia; Malaysia; Indonesia and Okinawa, Japan but frequently mistaken for Hypselodoris bullocki or Hypselodoris apolegma.

== Description ==
Hypselodoris variobranchia has a deep purple body with a broad solid white border to the mantle. The bulb of the rhinophores is orange, with purple sheaths. The gills may be orange or deep purple. There is a tall gill pocket which is also deep purple in colour. This species has frequently been reported as Hypselodoris bullocki. This is a large nudibranch, reaching 50 mm in length.
