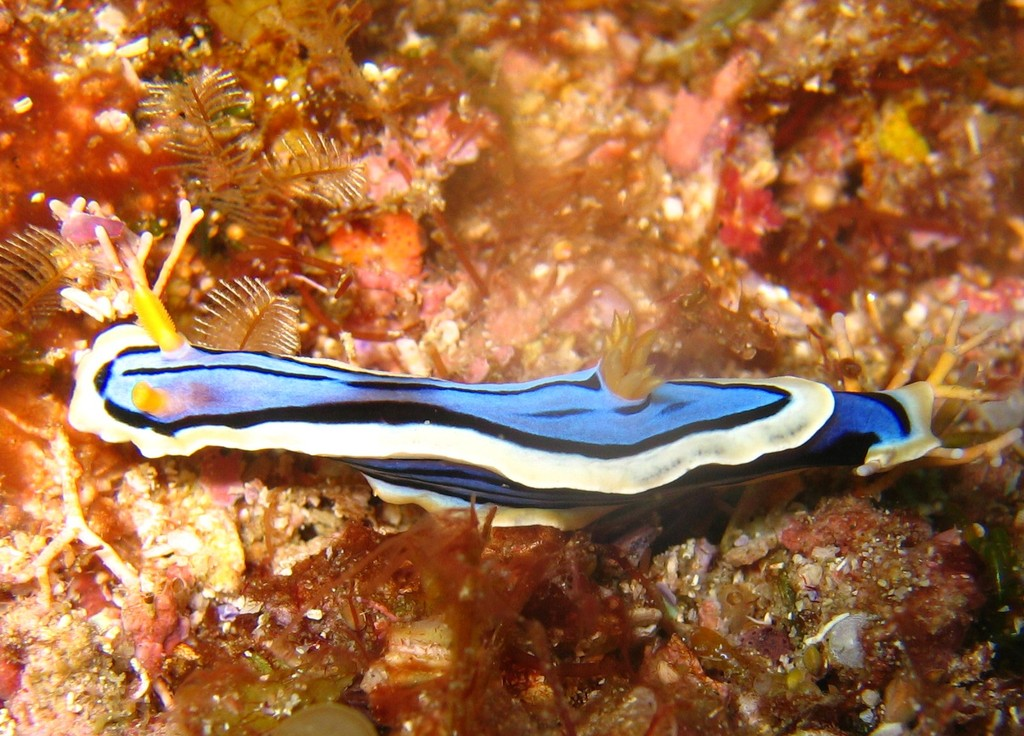
- Chromodoris elisabethina

Scientific classification
- Kingdom: Animalia
- Phylum: Mollusca
- Class: Gastropoda
- Order: Nudibranchia
- Family: Chromodorididae
- Genus: Chromodoris
- Species: C. elisabethina

Binomial name
- Chromodoris elisabethina (Bergh, 1877)

= Chromodoris elisabethina =

Species of gastropod

Chromodoris elisabethina is a species of very colourful sea slug, a dorid nudibranch, a marine gastropod mollusc in the family Chromodorididae.

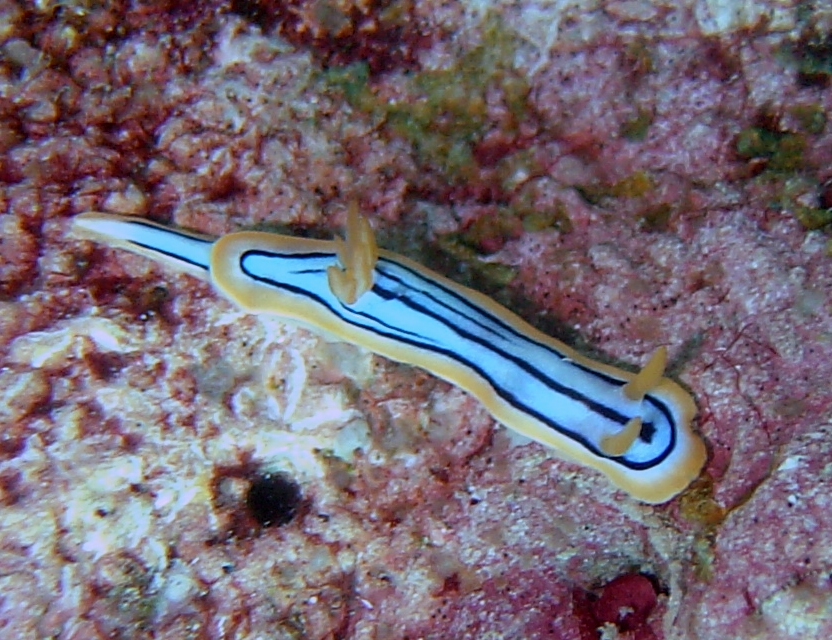
Chromodoris elisabethina

== Distribution ==
This species was described from Burias Island in the Philippines. It is found in the central area of the Indo-Pacific region from Malaysia, Indonesia, the Philippines and Queensland, Australia to the southern part of Japan.

== Description ==
Chromodoris elisabethina can reach a maximum size of 50 mm (2.0 in) length. The body is elongate with a foot which is distinct from the upper body by a skirt like mantle partially hiding the foot. The branched gills and the rhinophores are orange to yellow and can be withdrawn into pockets under the skin in case of danger.

The main background colour is bluish, the intensity of the latter varying from blue-grey to intense blue. The blue dorsal side has a median black line which may be broken in some individuals and usually some short, finer parallel lines. These longitudinal lines are also present on the foot. The longitudinal discontinuous lines are distinctive of this species and allow the observer to differentiate it from other close species like Chromodoris lochi, Chromodoris willani and Chromodoris annae.

The mantle edge and the foot are bordered with white and orange to yellow lines in which the width and the colour intensity can vary greatly from a specimen to another. The blue colour of the body and the external margin is outlined by a black line.

Chromodoris elisabethina has been demonstrated to be a species complex by a recent molecular phylogeny study.
