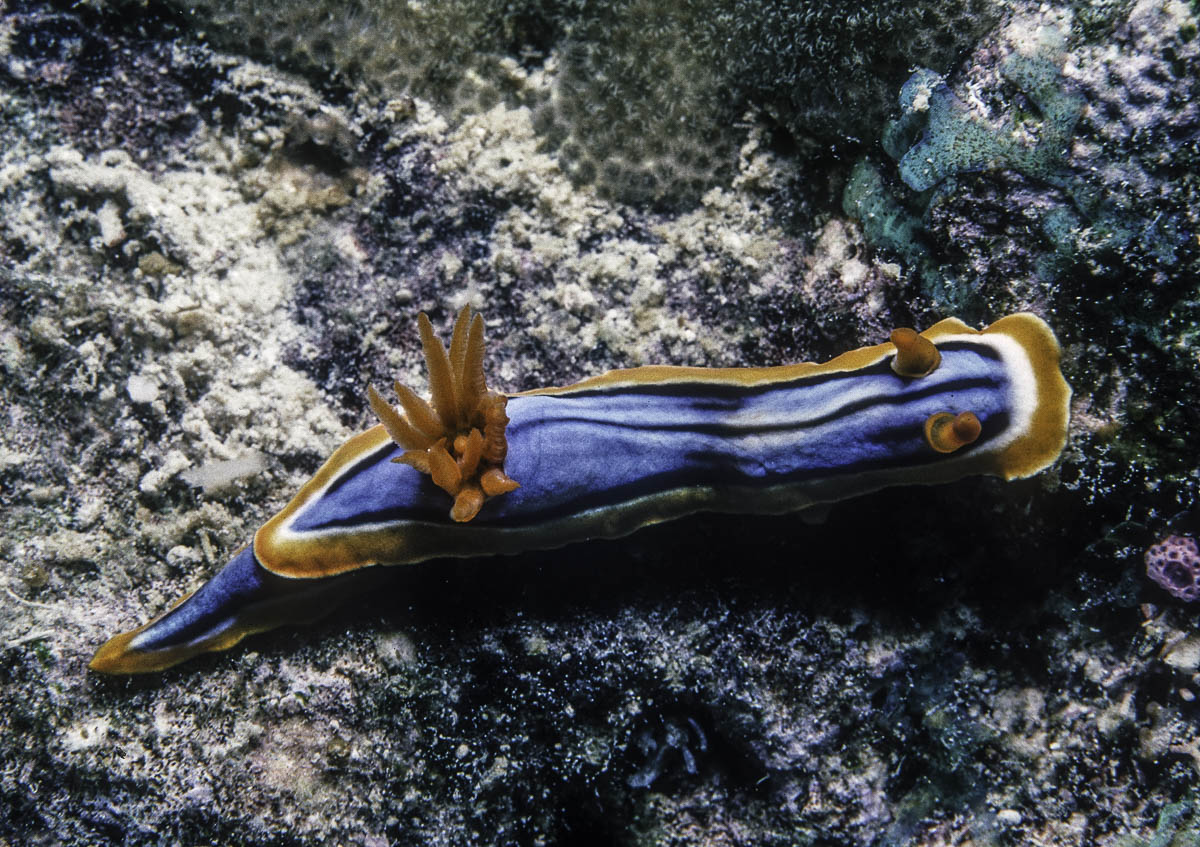
- The nudibranch Chromodoris hamiltoni, Pemba Island, Tanzania.

Scientific classification
- Kingdom: Animalia
- Phylum: Mollusca
- Class: Gastropoda
- Order: Nudibranchia
- Family: Chromodorididae
- Genus: Chromodoris
- Species: C. hamiltoni

Binomial name
- Chromodoris hamiltoni Rudman, 1977

= Chromodoris hamiltoni =

Species of gastropod

Chromodoris hamiltoni is a species of colourful sea slug, a dorid nudibranch, a marine gastropod mollusc in the family Chromodorididae.

== Description ==
This species has a primarily blue mantle, though this can be so light as to appear white. It sports either three or five black lines running the length of its body, though in the case of a five-lined specimen, it is not uncommon for the central lines to be replaced in sections by a loose brown patch of pigment. Its rhinophores and gills are orange in colour, as well as a band around the outer edge of the mantle and the foot. These bands help to differentiate C. hamiltoni from some other species, like Chromodoris lochi

== Distribution ==
This species was described from Tanzania. It has been reported from Mozambique, South Africa, Madagascar and Réunion.
