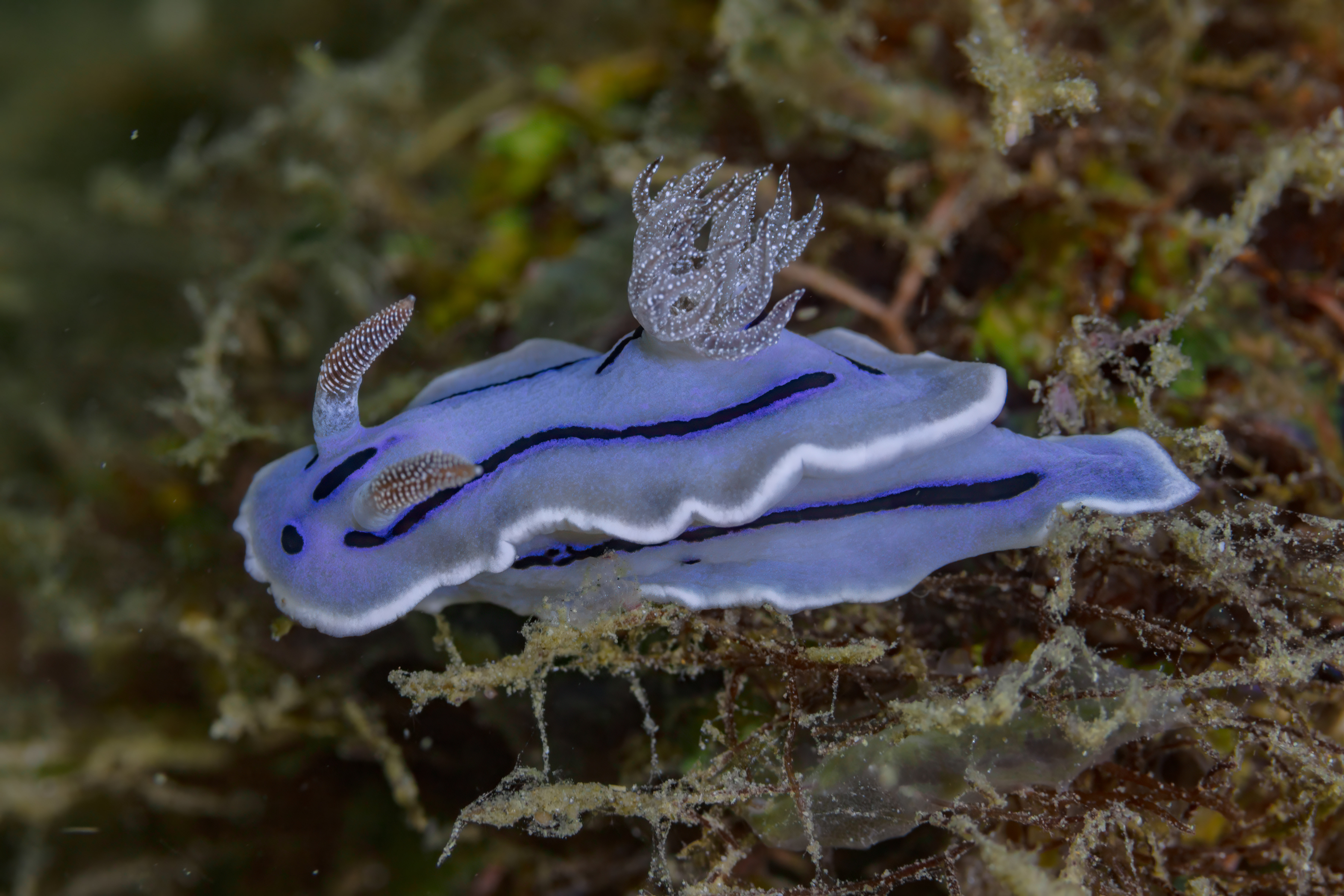
- Chromodoris willani in the Philippines

Scientific classification
- Kingdom: Animalia
- Phylum: Mollusca
- Class: Gastropoda
- Order: Nudibranchia
- Family: Chromodorididae
- Genus: Chromodoris
- Species: C. willani

Binomial name
- Chromodoris willani Rudman, 1982

= Chromodoris willani =

Species of gastropod

Chromodoris willani, commonly known as Willan's chromodoris, is a species of sea slug, a dorid nudibranch, a shell-less marine gastropod mollusk in the family Chromodorididae. The species is named for the renowned nudibranch taxonomist Dr. Richard C. Willan.

== Distribution ==
This nudibranch is found in the Western Pacific Ocean, from Indonesia and the Philippines to Vanuatu.

== Description ==
Chromodoris willani is similar in appearance to Chromodoris lochi, Chromodoris boucheti and Chromodoris dianae. This species can be distinguished by the very prominent white specks found on the gills and rhinophores.

Individuals in this species can range in color from dark blue to a translucent white. All have black stripes with the center-most stripe typically being non-continuous.

== Ecology ==
Chromodoris willani, like many other nudibranchs, feeds on sponges. It has been reported to eat Cacospongia mycofijiensis and Semitaspongia, both in the family Thorectidae.

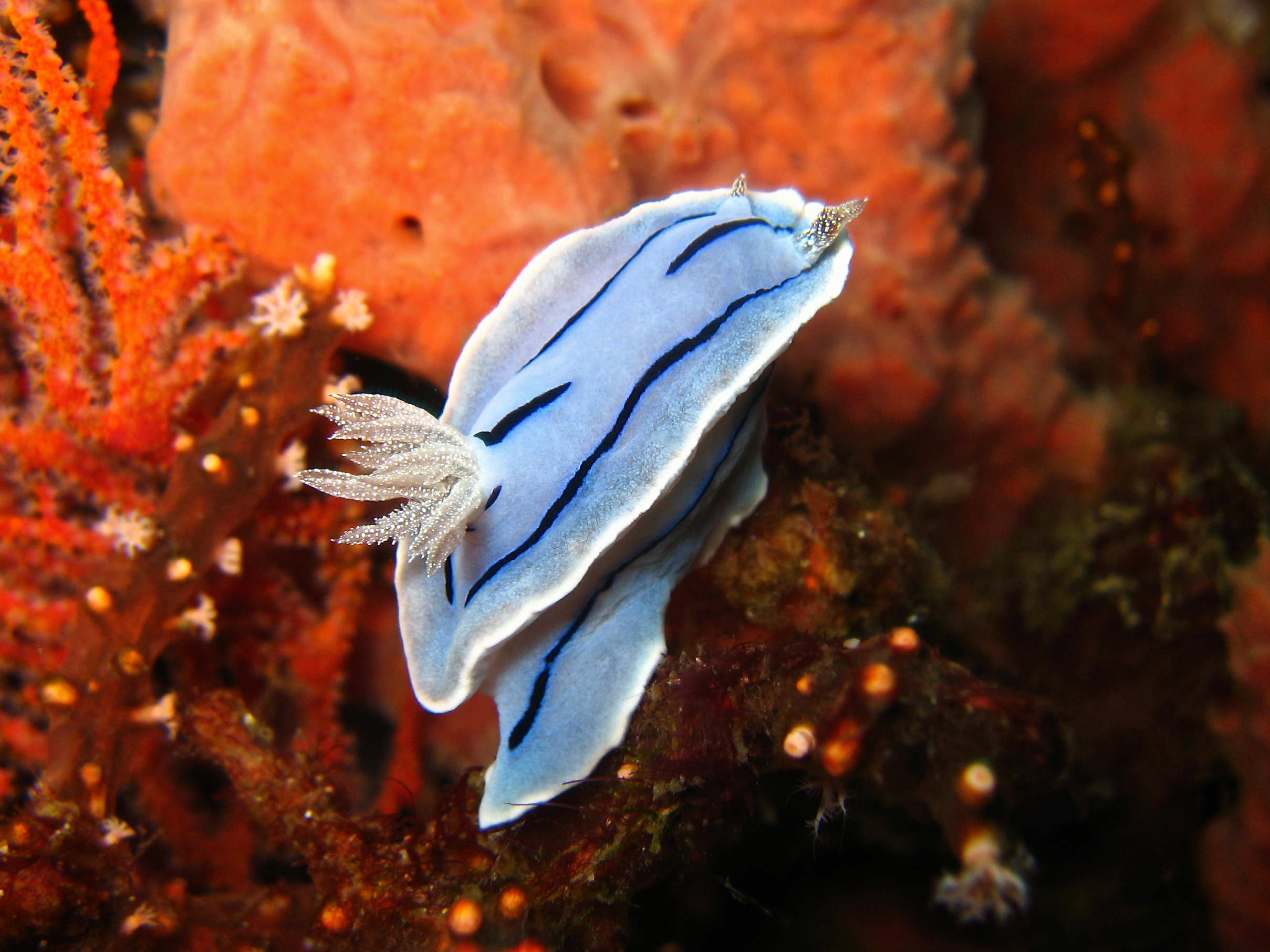
Blue form of Chromodoris willani

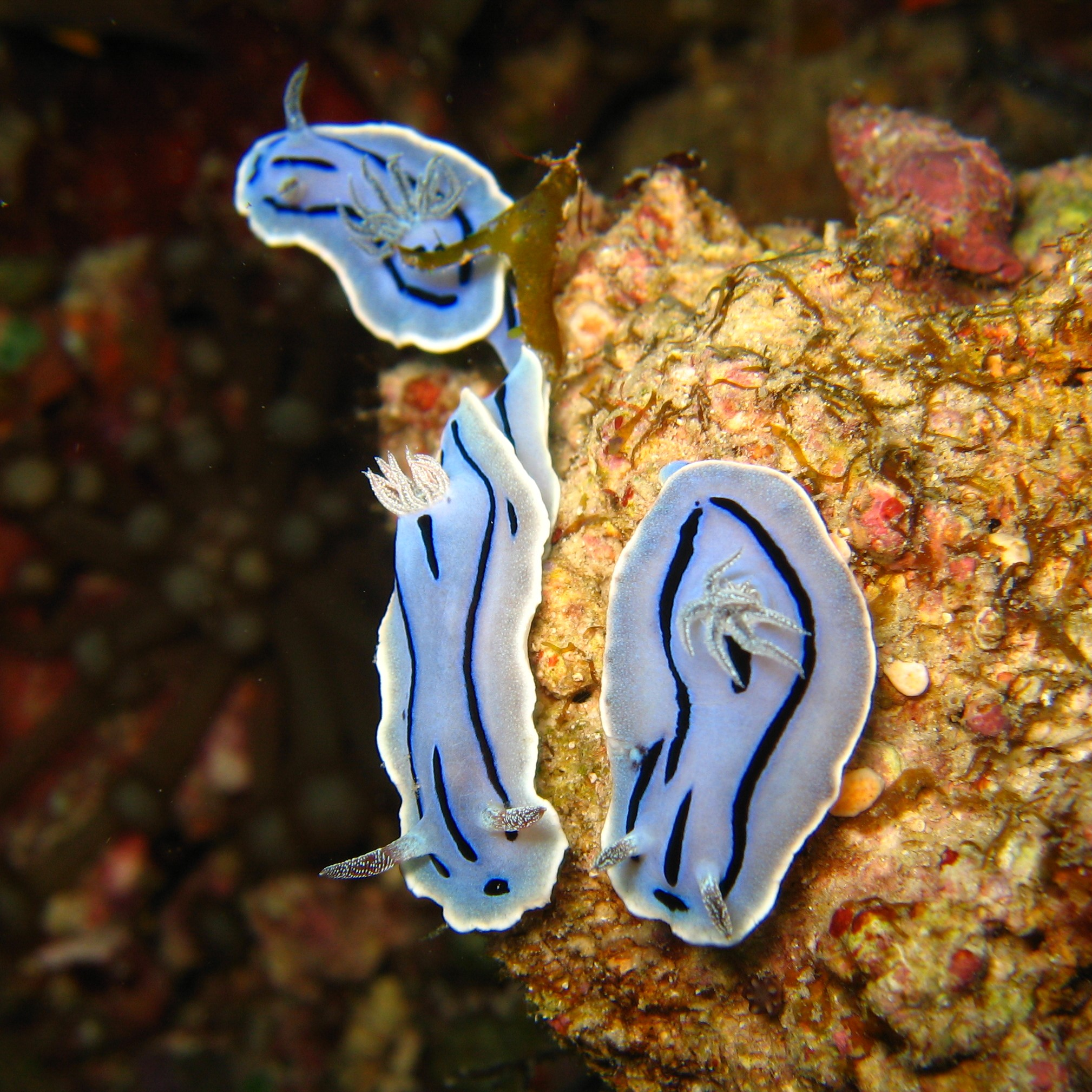
Pale blue individuals of Chromodoris willani

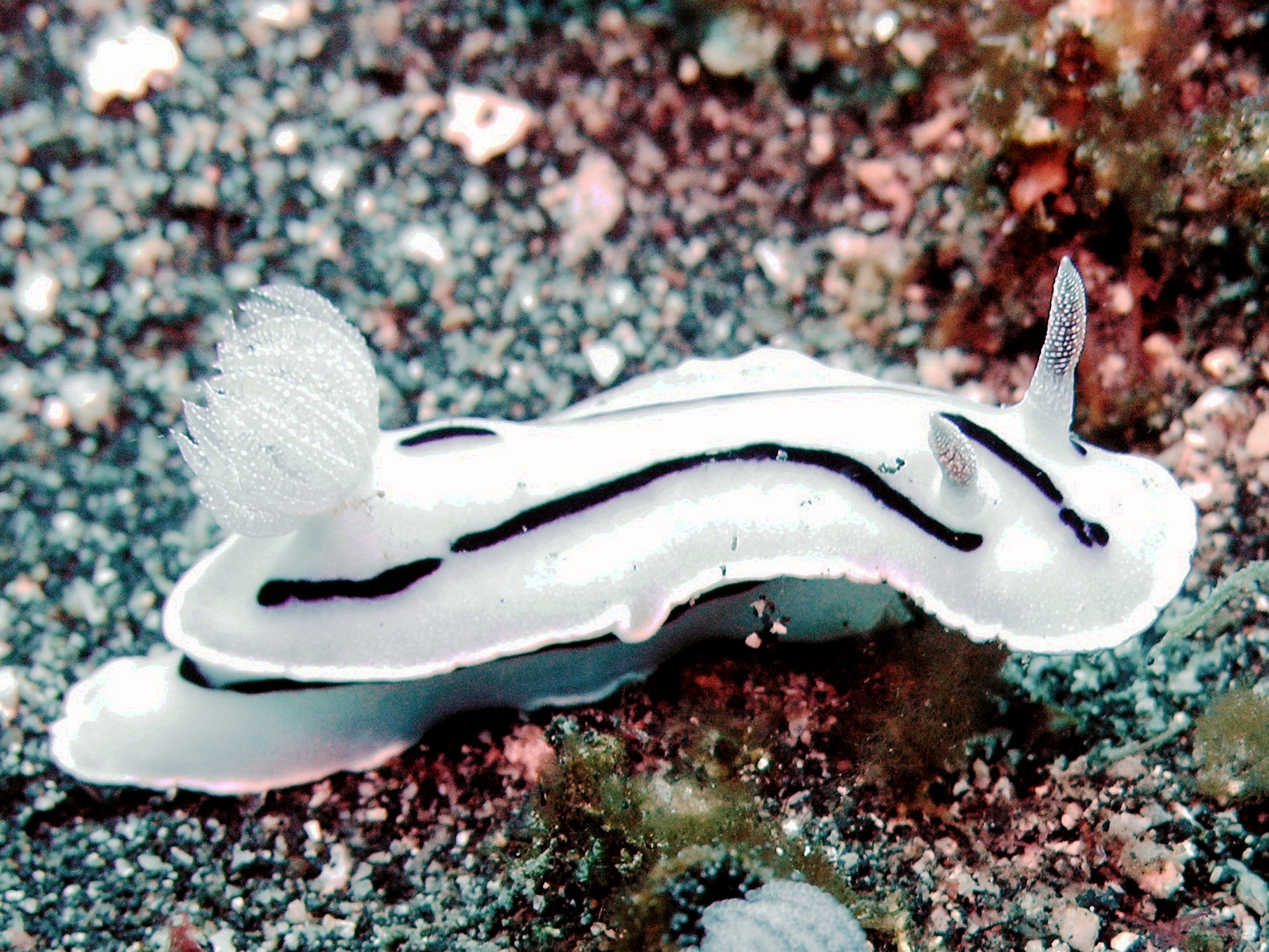
White form of Chromodoris willani

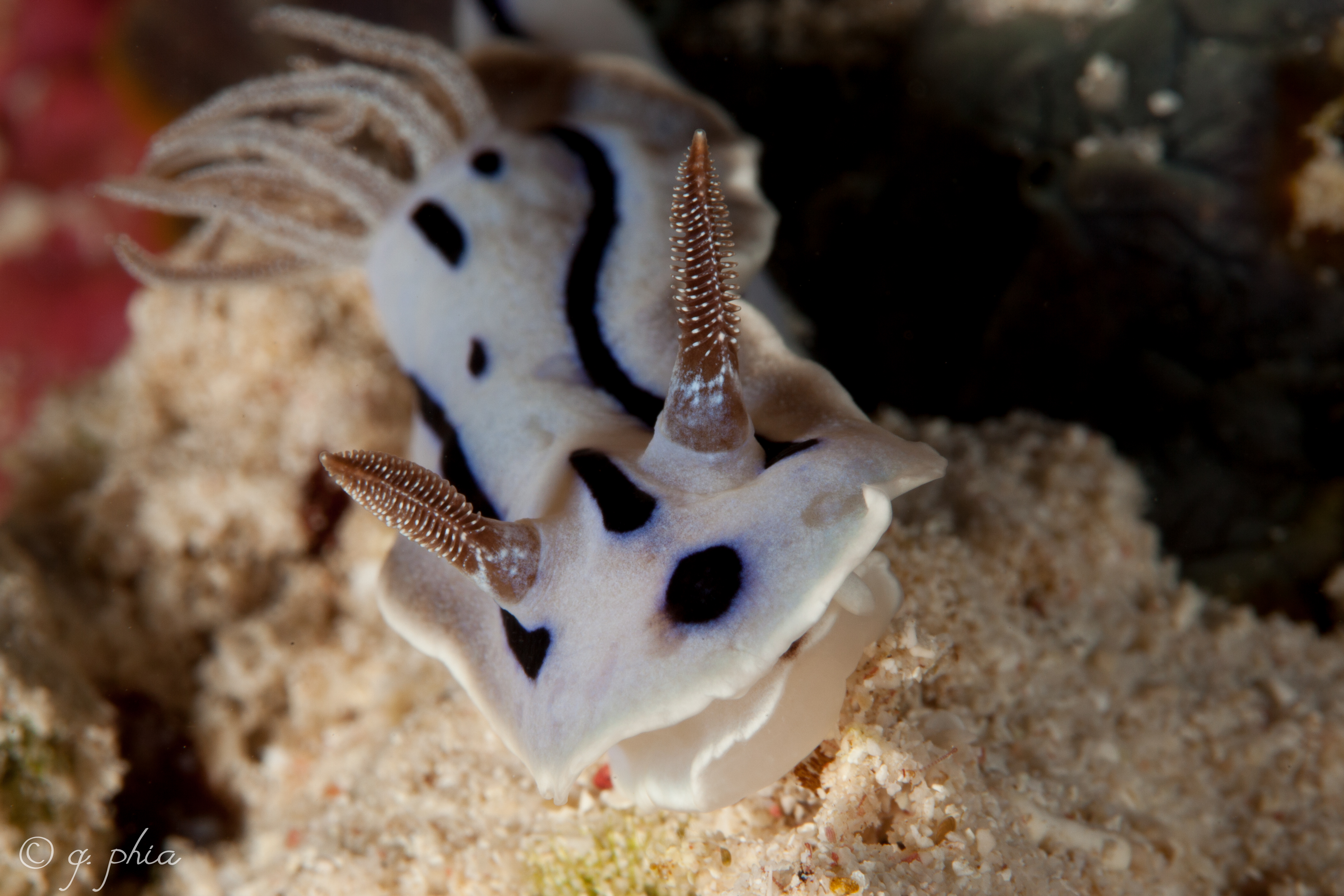
Browny form of Chromodoris willani in Wakatobi National Park, 2016
