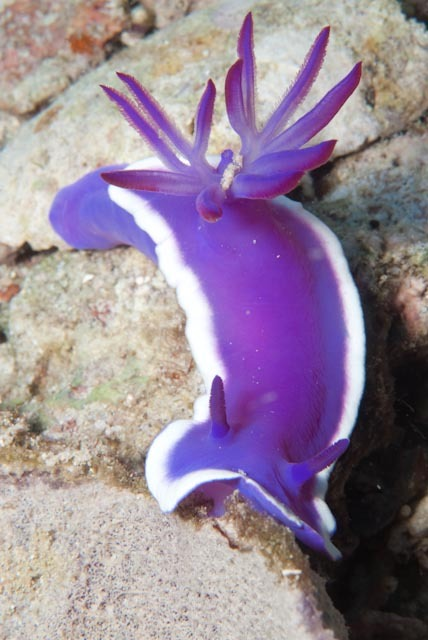

Scientific classification
- Kingdom: Animalia
- Phylum: Mollusca
- Class: Gastropoda
- Order: Nudibranchia
- Family: Chromodorididae
- Genus: Hypselodoris
- Species: H. violacea

Binomial name
- Hypselodoris violacea Gosliner & Johnson, 2018

= Hypselodoris violacea =

Species of gastropod

Hypselodoris violacea is a species of sea slug, or dorid nudibranch, a marine gastropod mollusc in the family Chromodorididae.

== Distribution ==
The holotype of this nudibranch was collected at a 10-metre (33 ft) depth from Magic Reef, Busuanga Island, Palawan, Philippines, 11.99°N 120.08°E. It is known only from Palawan, Philippines and northern Borneo, Malaysia.

== Description ==
Hypselodoris violacea has a deep, dark purple body with a broad solid white border to the mantle. The bulb of the rhinophores is deep purple, with sheaths of the same colour. The gills are also entirely deep purple. There is a tall gill pocket which is also deep purple in colour. This is a large nudibranch, reaching 50 millimetres (2.0 in) in length. This species has been reported as Hypselodoris bullocki.
