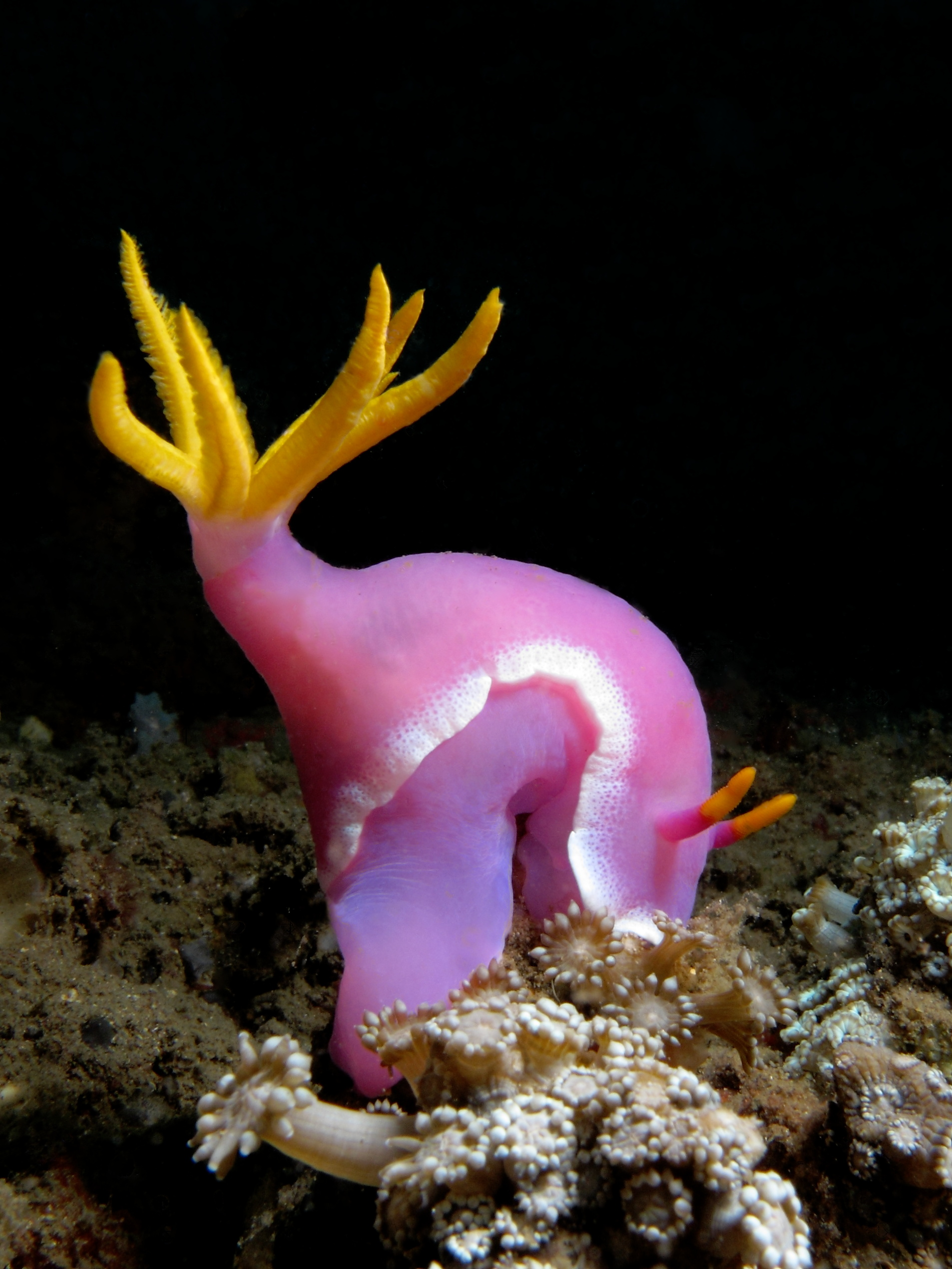
- Hypselodoris apolegma at Bima bay, Indonesia

Scientific classification
- Kingdom: Animalia
- Phylum: Mollusca
- Class: Gastropoda
- Order: Nudibranchia
- Family: Chromodorididae
- Genus: Hypselodoris
- Species: H. apolegma

Binomial name
- Hypselodoris apolegma (Yonow, 2001)

Synonyms
- Risbecia apolegma Yonow, 2001

= Hypselodoris apolegma =

Species of gastropod

Hypselodoris apolegma (or "Bubblegum Worm" as it is commonly known) is a species of colourful sea slug or dorid nudibranch, a marine gastropod mollusk in the family Chromodorididae.

== Taxonomic history ==
Recent phylogenetic data confirm the validity of the species and suggest a sister species relationship between Hypselodoris apolegma and Hypselodoris bullockii. A later study revealed a large clade of animals with similar colouration with Hypselodoris brycei as sister species to H. apolegma.

== Distribution ==
This nudibranch is found in the tropical Western Pacific Ocean.

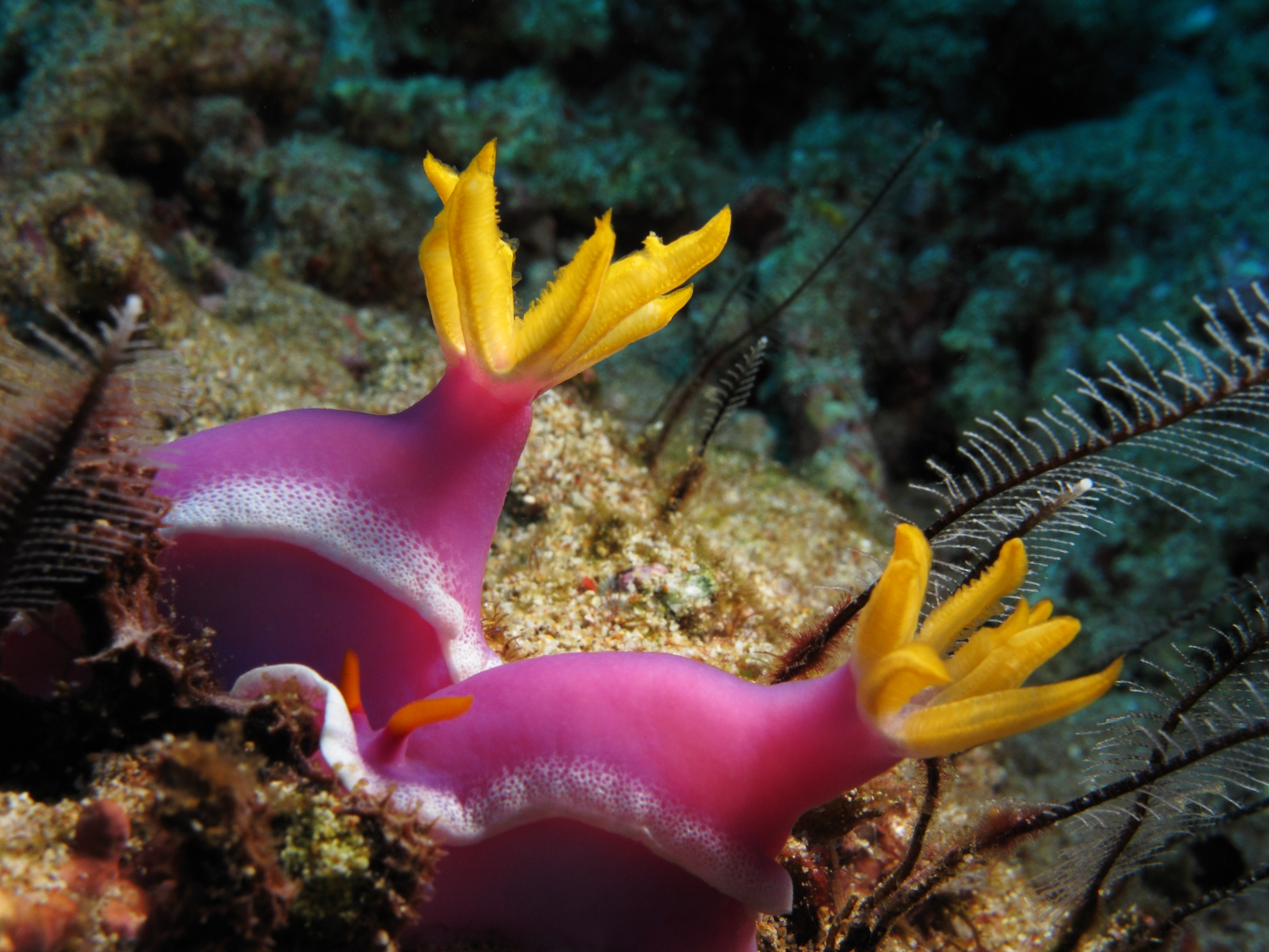
Pair of H. apolegma at Batu Moncho (near Komodo, Indonesia)

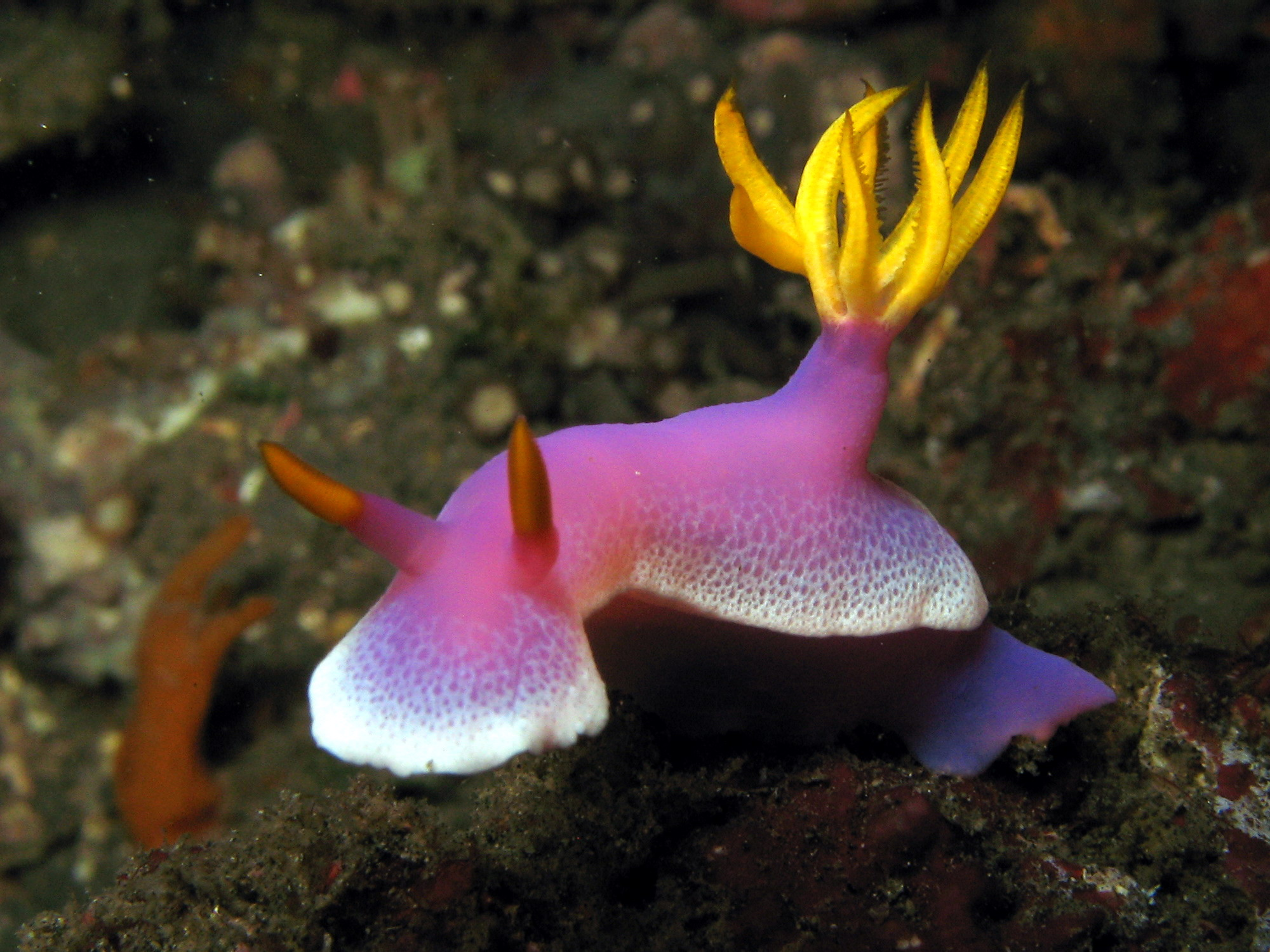
Hypselodoris apolegma
