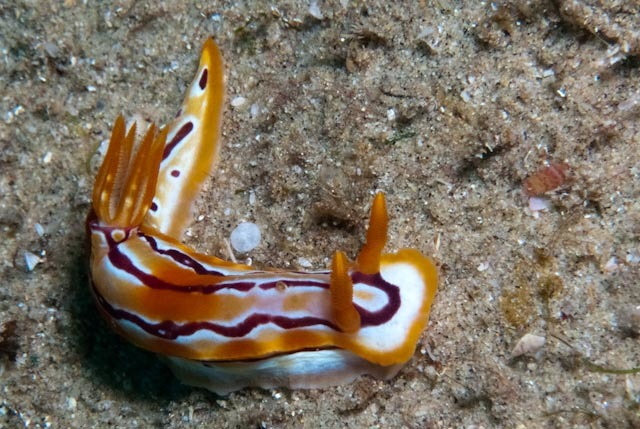

Scientific classification
- Kingdom: Animalia
- Phylum: Mollusca
- Class: Gastropoda
- Order: Nudibranchia
- Family: Chromodorididae
- Genus: Hypselodoris
- Species: H. regina

Binomial name
- Hypselodoris regina Er. Marcus & Ev. Marcus, 1970

= Hypselodoris regina =

Species of gastropod

Hypselodoris regina is a conspicuous species of sea slug or dorid nudibranch, a marine gastropod mollusk in the family Chromodorididae.

== Distribution ==
This nudibranch was described from one specimen collected at Nosy Tanikely, south of Nosy Be, Madagascar amongst coral at 2 m depth. It has been reported from South Africa, Tanzania and Mozambique. It is known only from the Western Indian Ocean.

== Description ==
Hypselodoris regina has an orange body with typically three black longitudinal lines separated by two elongate orange patches and a white background on its dorsum. There is a continuous or broken orange margin to the mantle. The gills and rhinophores are orange, sometimes outlined in white. This nudibranch is similar in appearance to Chromodoris colemani and Chromodoris hamiltoni, an example of mimicry.

This species can reach a total length of at least 40 mm and has been observed feeding on sponges from the genus Dysidea.
