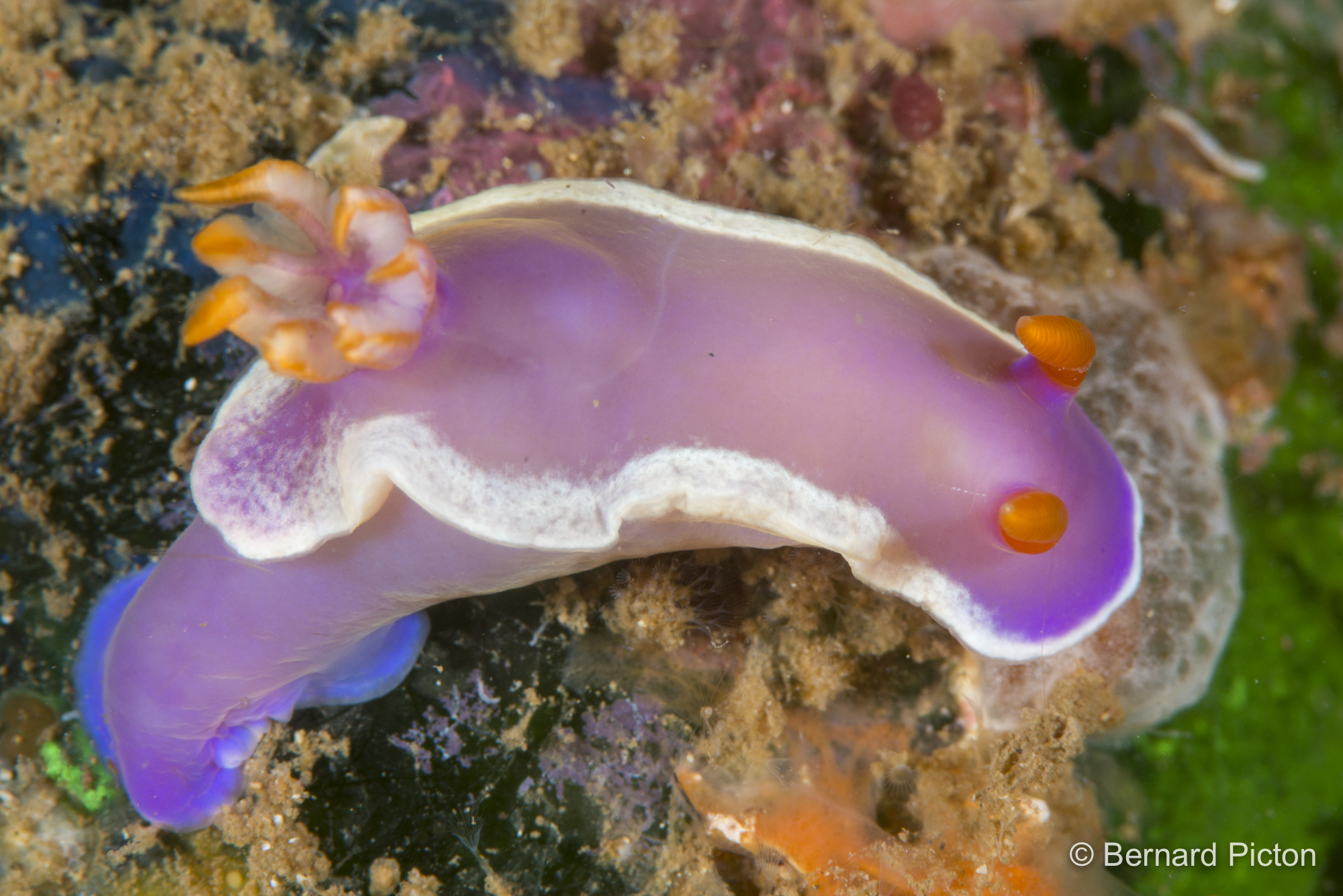
- Bima Bay, Nusa Tenggara, Indonesia

Scientific classification
- Kingdom: Animalia
- Phylum: Mollusca
- Class: Gastropoda
- Order: Nudibranchia
- Family: Chromodorididae
- Genus: Hypselodoris
- Species: H. iba

Binomial name
- Hypselodoris iba Gosliner & Johnson, 2018

= Hypselodoris iba =

Species of gastropod

Hypselodoris iba is a species of sea slug or dorid nudibranch, a marine gastropod mollusc in the family Chromodorididae. It has previously been confused with Hypselodoris bullocki.

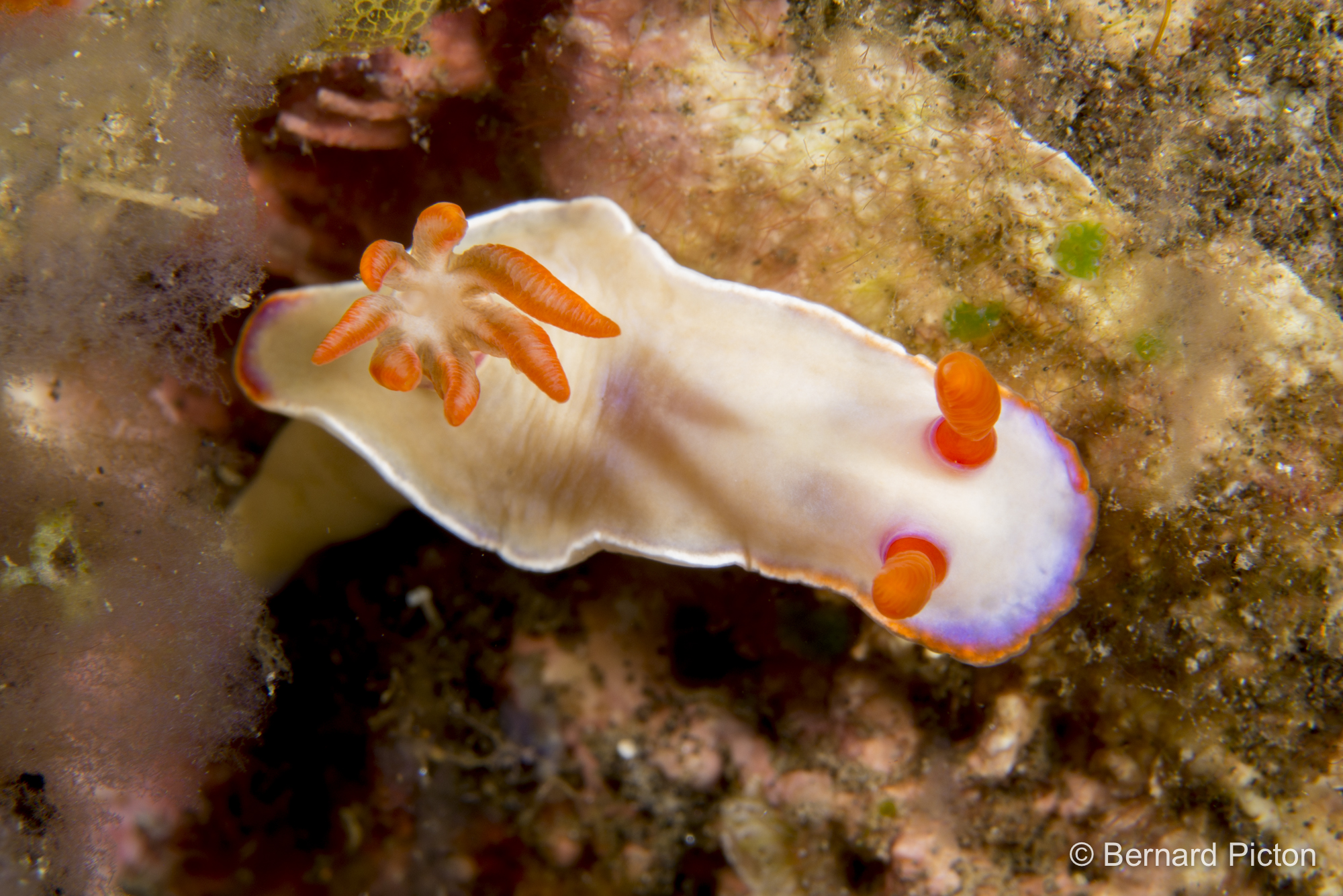
Hypselodoris iba, pale form, Sangeang, Lesser Sunda Islands, Indonesia

== Distribution ==
This nudibranch was described from 35 m (115 ft) depth at Aphol's Reef, Tingloy, Maricaban Island, Batangas, Philippines, 13.6586°N 120.90129°E. It is also reported from Indonesia.

== Description ==
Hypselodoris iba has previously been confused with Hypselodoris bullocki although DNA sequencing suggests that it is a mimic rather than a close relative. It has a range of colour forms. Typically it has a violet semi-translucent body with a bright opaque white margin to the mantle. The violet colouration can be absent and replaced by milky white or present just as a more intense inner border to the mantle. In these pale colour forms there is usually a brown patch in the middle of the back, edged with violet. The gills are pale at the base becoming orange or brown towards the tips. The rhinophores have orange or brown clubs and usually have purple bases. A characteristic which distinguishes this species from similar coloured species in the Hypselodoris bullocki clade is that the mantle behind the gills is quite abruptly narrowed and contain a concentration of subcutaneous defensive glands. This species can reach a total length of at least 70 mm.
