= Hypselodoris cerisae =

Scientific classification
- Kingdom: Animalia
- Phylum: Mollusca
- Class: Gastropoda
- Order: Nudibranchia
- Family: Chromodorididae
- Genus: Hypselodoris
- Species: H. cerisae

Binomial name
- Hypselodoris cerisae Gosliner & Johnson, 2018

Species of gastropod

Hypselodoris cerisae is a species of sea slug or dorid nudibranch, a marine gastropod mollusc in the family Chromodorididae.

== Distribution ==
This nudibranch was described from Long Dong, Taipei County, Taiwan with additional specimens from Hachijo Island, Japan and Pulau Aur, Malaysia. It was previously mistaken for Hypselodoris krakatoa.

== Description ==
Hypselodoris cerisae has a translucent white body with extensive opaque white patches centred with yellow. On the back the patches are created by a series of dark brown lines and spots arranged to form an irregular rectangular meshwork with a similar pattern on the sides of the body and tail. There are white spots associated with the strongest of these lines, which run from outside the bases of the rhinophores along the body to join behind the gills. There is a mid-dorsal line which starts as a ring between the rhinophores and finishes in front of the gill pocket; it is often interrupted. There is irregular purple pigment at the mantle edge, paler and more extensive at the front of the head. The gills have orange pigment lines at the sides and a white outer face. The rhinophores have orange-brown clubs and orange bases. This species can reach a total length of at least 35 mm.
