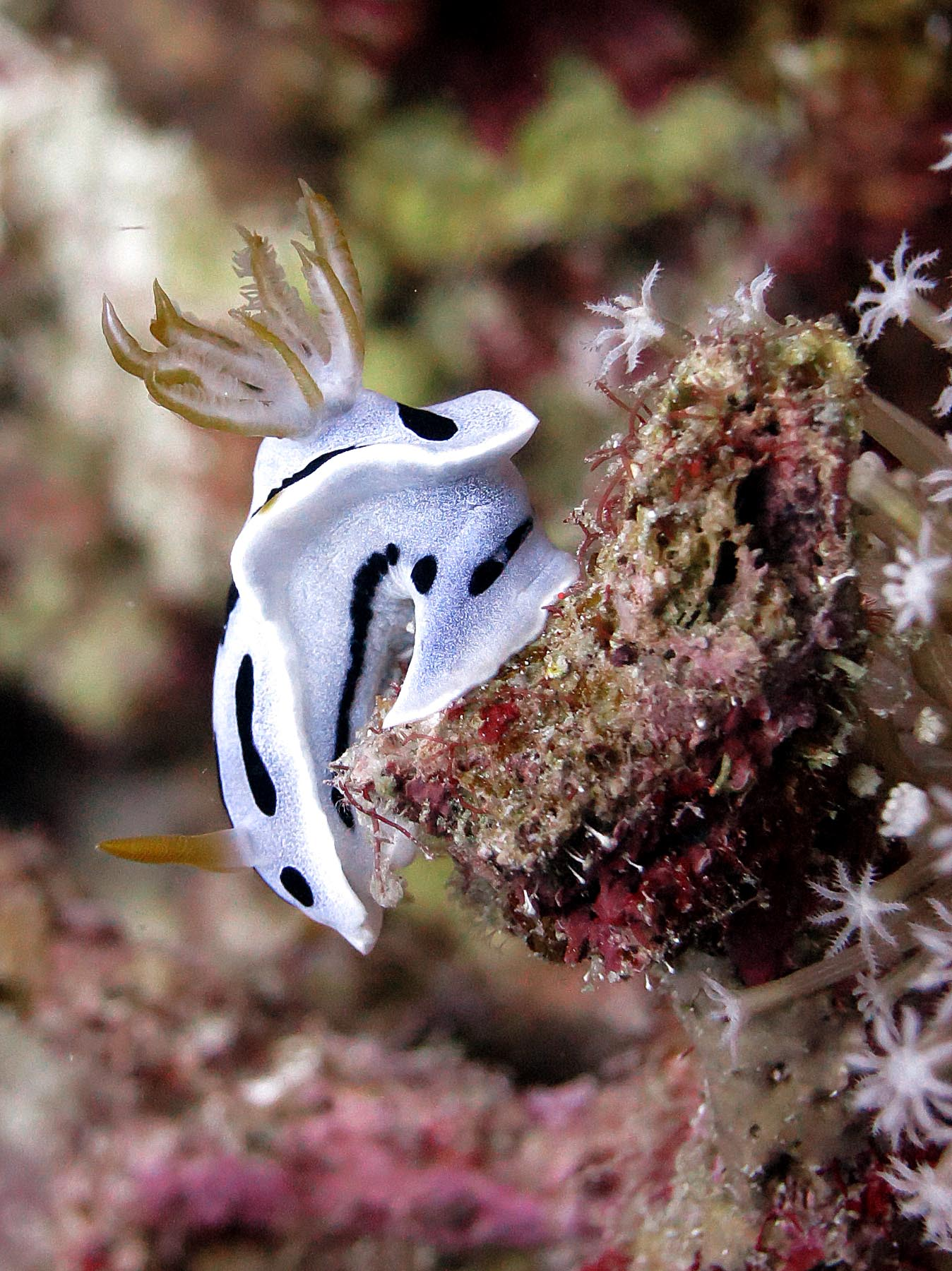
- Chromodoris dianae
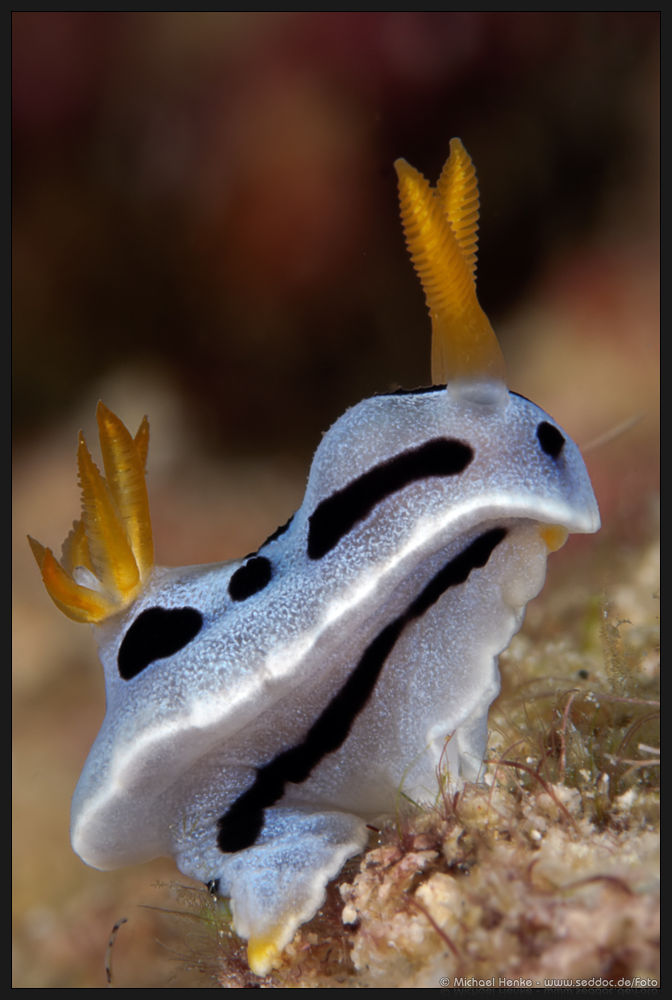
- Chromodoris dianae

Scientific classification
- Kingdom: Animalia
- Phylum: Mollusca
- Class: Gastropoda
- Order: Nudibranchia
- Family: Chromodorididae
- Genus: Chromodoris
- Species: C. dianae

Binomial name
- Chromodoris dianae Gosliner & Behrens, 1998

= Chromodoris dianae =

Species of gastropod

Chromodoris dianae is a species of sea slug, a dorid nudibranch, a shell-less marine gastropod mollusc in the family Chromodorididae.

== Distribution ==
This species is known only from the Philippines, Indonesia and Borneo.

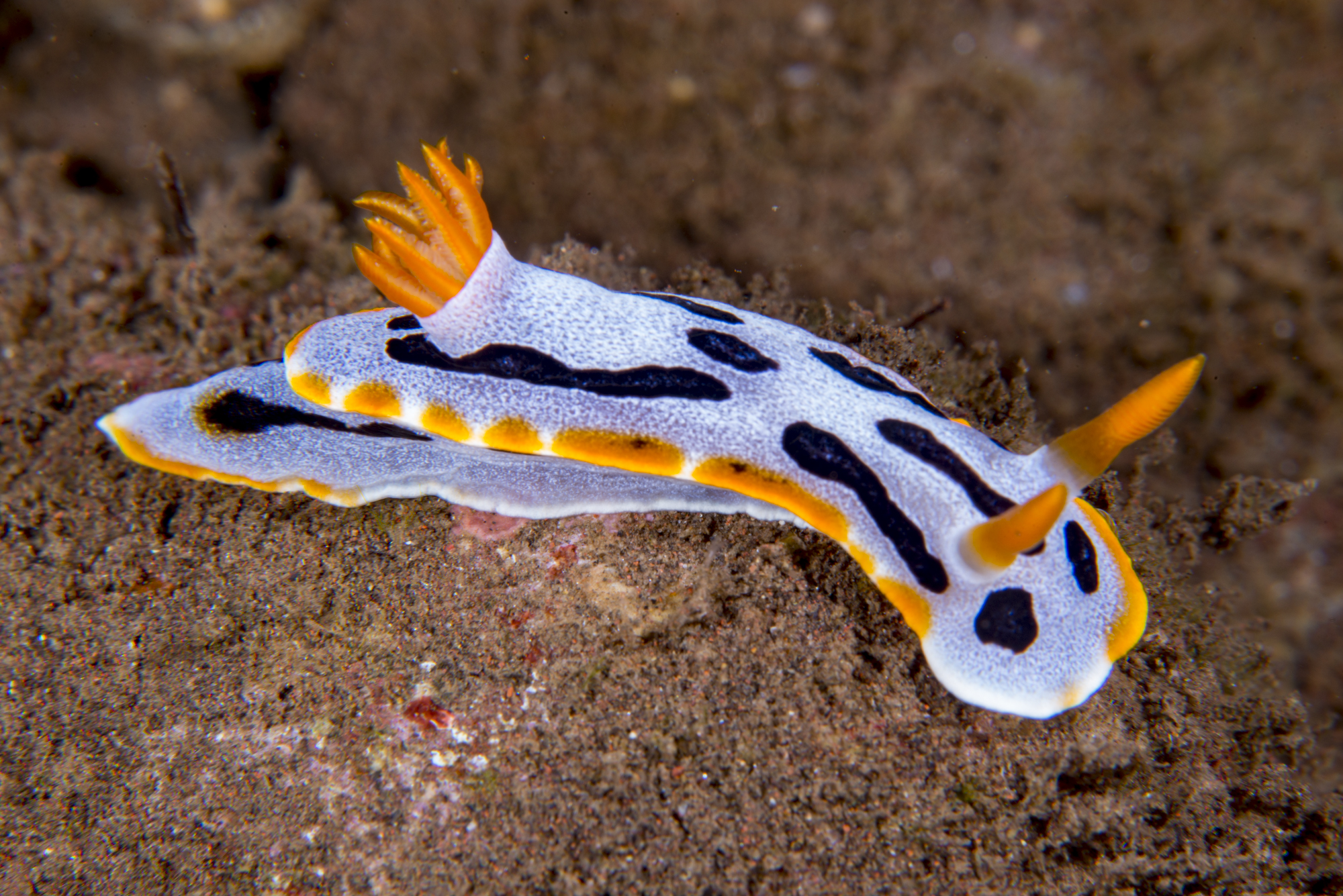
Chromodoris cf. dianae, Batu Niti, Kubu, Karangasem, Bali.

== Description ==
Chromodoris dianae can reach a maximum size of 4 cm length. The body is elongate with a foot which is distinct from the upper body by a skirt like mantle partially hiding the foot. This species is very similar in appearance to Chromodoris lochi although it can be distinguished from the latter by the broken black lines, (as opposed to continuous) and the sprinkling of white specks on the notum. Chromodoris dianae has white gills and rhinophores with distinct yellow-orange tips. The original description includes animals which belong to another species (Chromodoris cf. dianae) which are distinguished by a colour pattern which includes gills and rhinophores orange throughout, orange markings at the edge of the mantle and a different pattern of black markings; confirmed as species level differences by DNA sequences.

== Ecology ==
Chromodoris dianae, like many other nudibranchs, feeds on sponges. It has been reported to eat Cacospongia mycofijiensis and Petrosaspongia nigra, both in the family Thorectidae.
