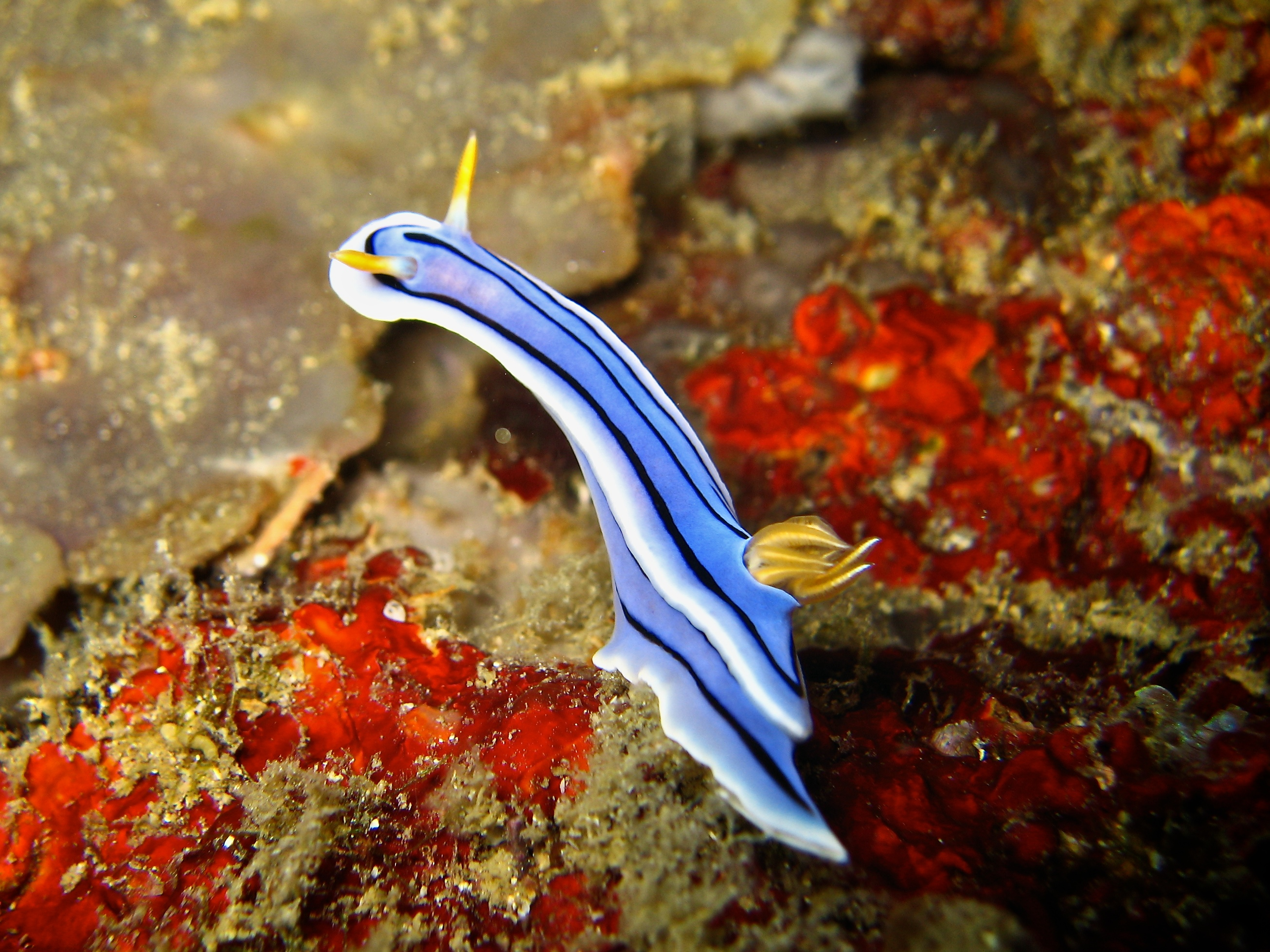
- In the Philippines

Scientific classification
- Kingdom: Animalia
- Phylum: Mollusca
- Class: Gastropoda
- Order: Nudibranchia
- Family: Chromodorididae
- Genus: Chromodoris
- Species: C. lochi

Binomial name
- Chromodoris lochi Rudman, 1982

Synonyms
- Chromodoris boucheti Rudman, 1982

= Chromodoris lochi =

Species of gastropod

Chromodoris lochi, common name Loch's chromodoris, or Loch's chromodoris slug, is a species of colourful sea slug, a dorid nudibranch, a marine gastropod mollusk in the family Chromodorididae.

== Distribution ==
This species is found in the tropical waters of the central Indo-Pacific region and is known to range from Malaysia, Indonesia, Philippines to Fiji and the northern coast of Australia.

== Description ==
Chromodoris lochi is blue or blueish-white with a white margin and typically dark or black lines running down the mantle and the foot, described by William Rudman in 1982. On the mantle, a continuous line runs around the border passing on the outside of the rhinophore and a second median one can be discontinuous. Individuals can reach at least 4 cm in length. There is some variation between individuals in this species, and the gills (retractile) and rhinophores (contractile) range in colour from a translucent straw-color, through to pink and light orange. This species is very similar in appearance to Chromodoris willani, and Chromodoris dianae and can be difficult to tell apart. Its most distinguishing feature is the uniform colouring of the mantle and the lack of white specks which are present in some of the other species. A recent study showed that more than one species is currently confused amongst Chromodoris lochi.

(Description of Chromodoris boucheti) Chromodoris boucheti can reach a length of 30–50 mm. The upper surface of the body is bluish white, with longitudinal black lines and yellow rhinophores. The lower half of the gills is white, the upper half is yellow. Moreover, this species shows characteristic black markings running up from the base on the inside and outside edge of its gills. The inner black marking is quite pronounced. It is similar in colour pattern to Chromodoris elisabethina and Chromodoris lochi.

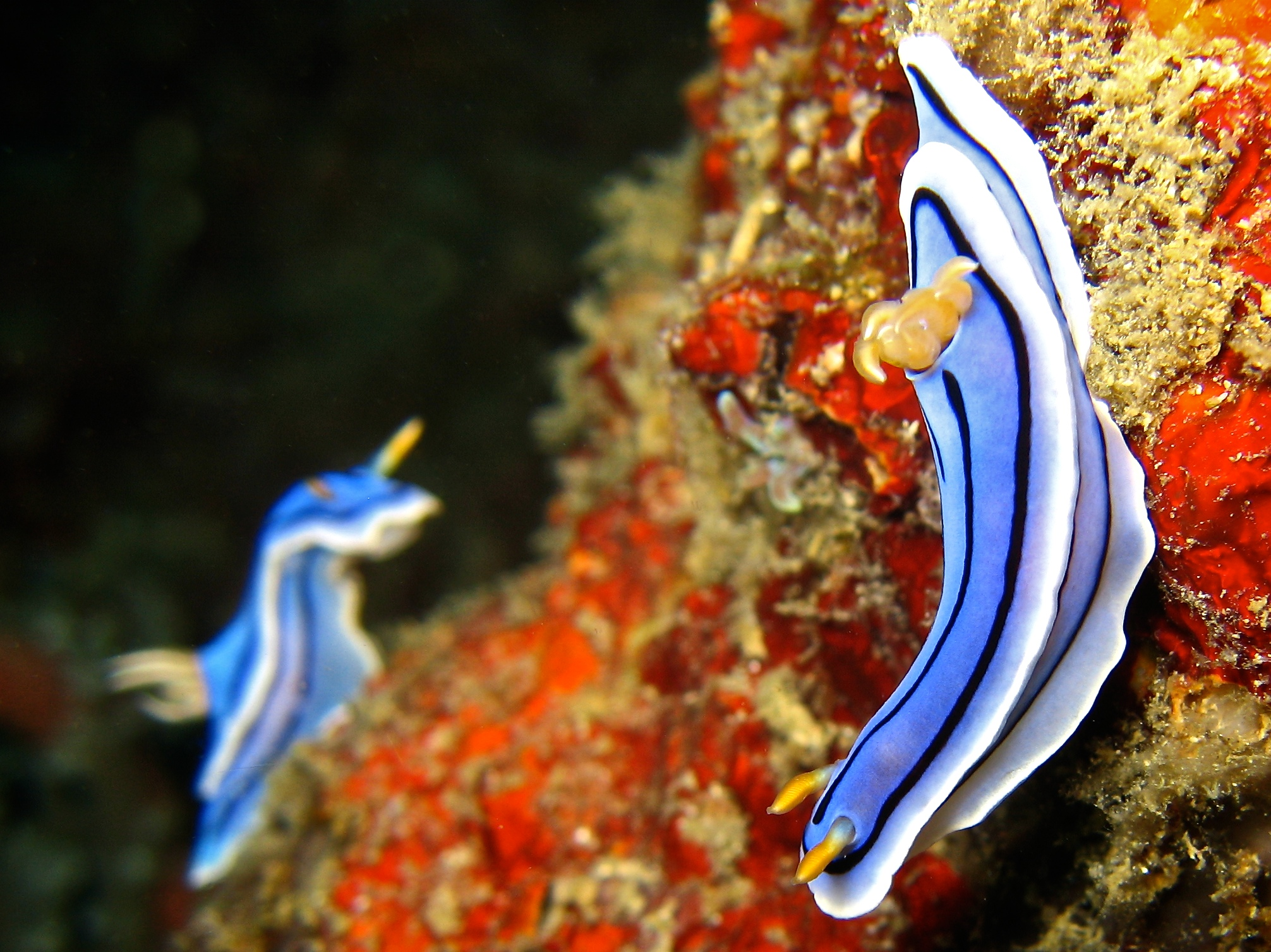
Chromodoris lochi pair in Puerto Galera, the Philippines

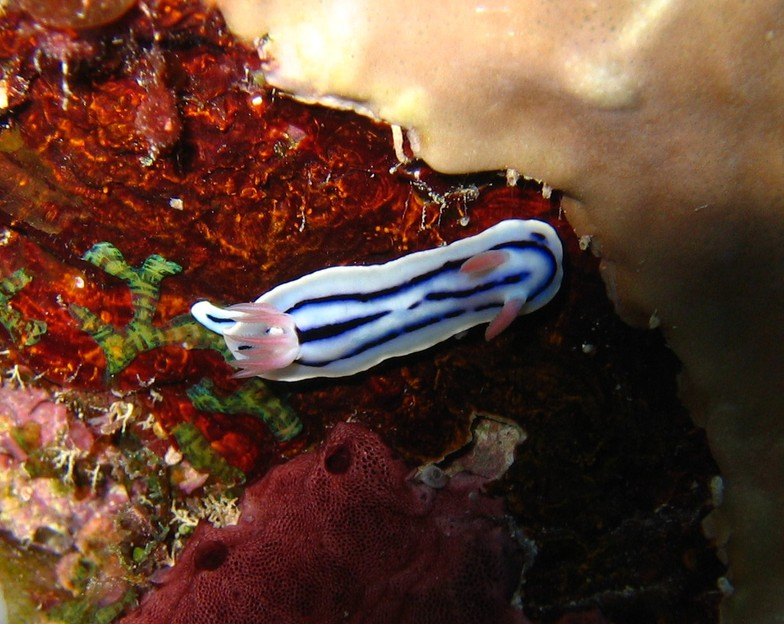
C. lochi from Papua New Guinea

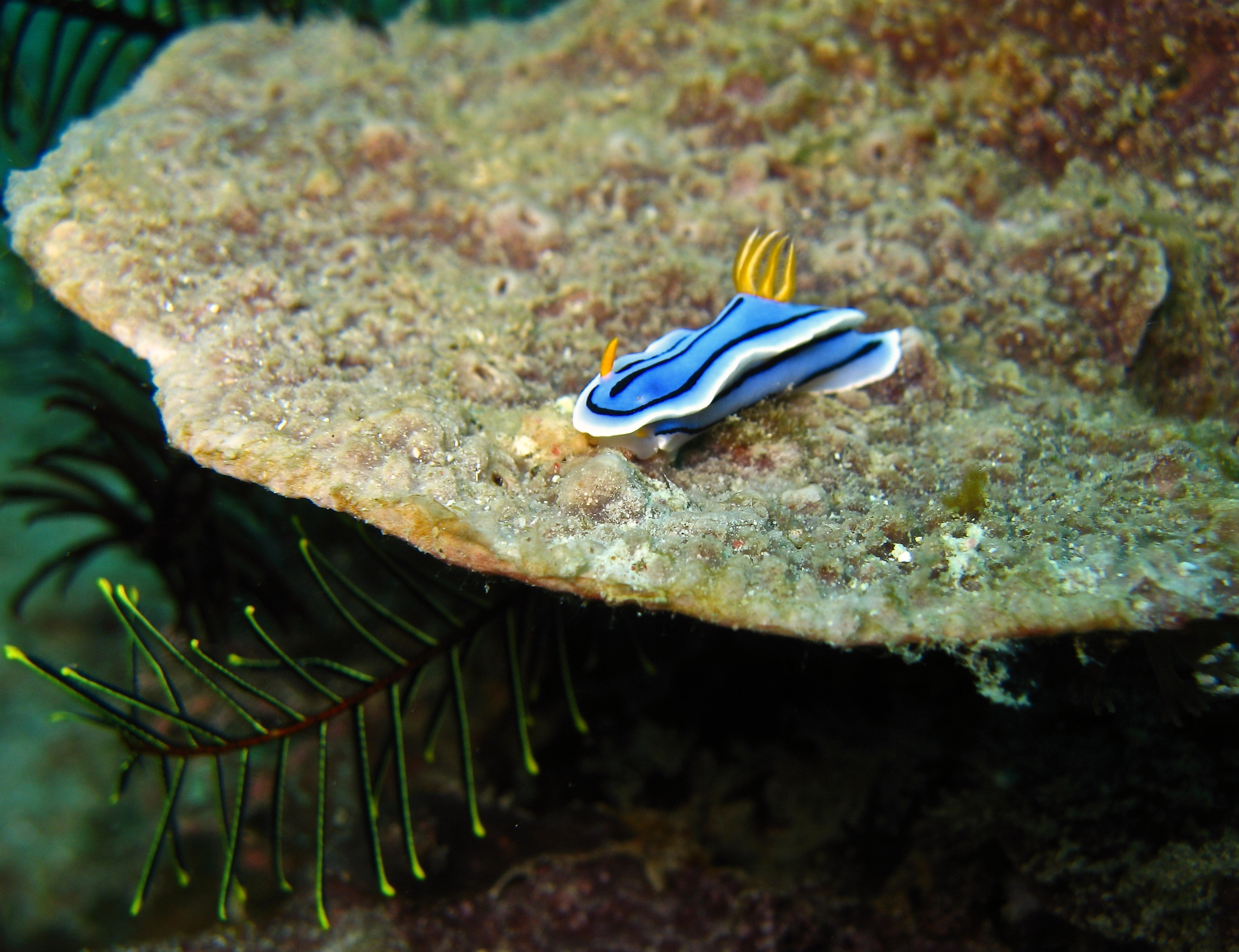
C. lochi with missing rhinophore in Puerto Galera, the Philippines

== Habitat ==
This species can be found on the coral reefs to depths of 35 meters.

== Ecology ==
Chromodoris lochi, like many other dorid nudibranchs, feeds on sponges. It has been reported to eat Cacospongia mycofijiensis and Semitaspongia, both in the family Thorectidae.
