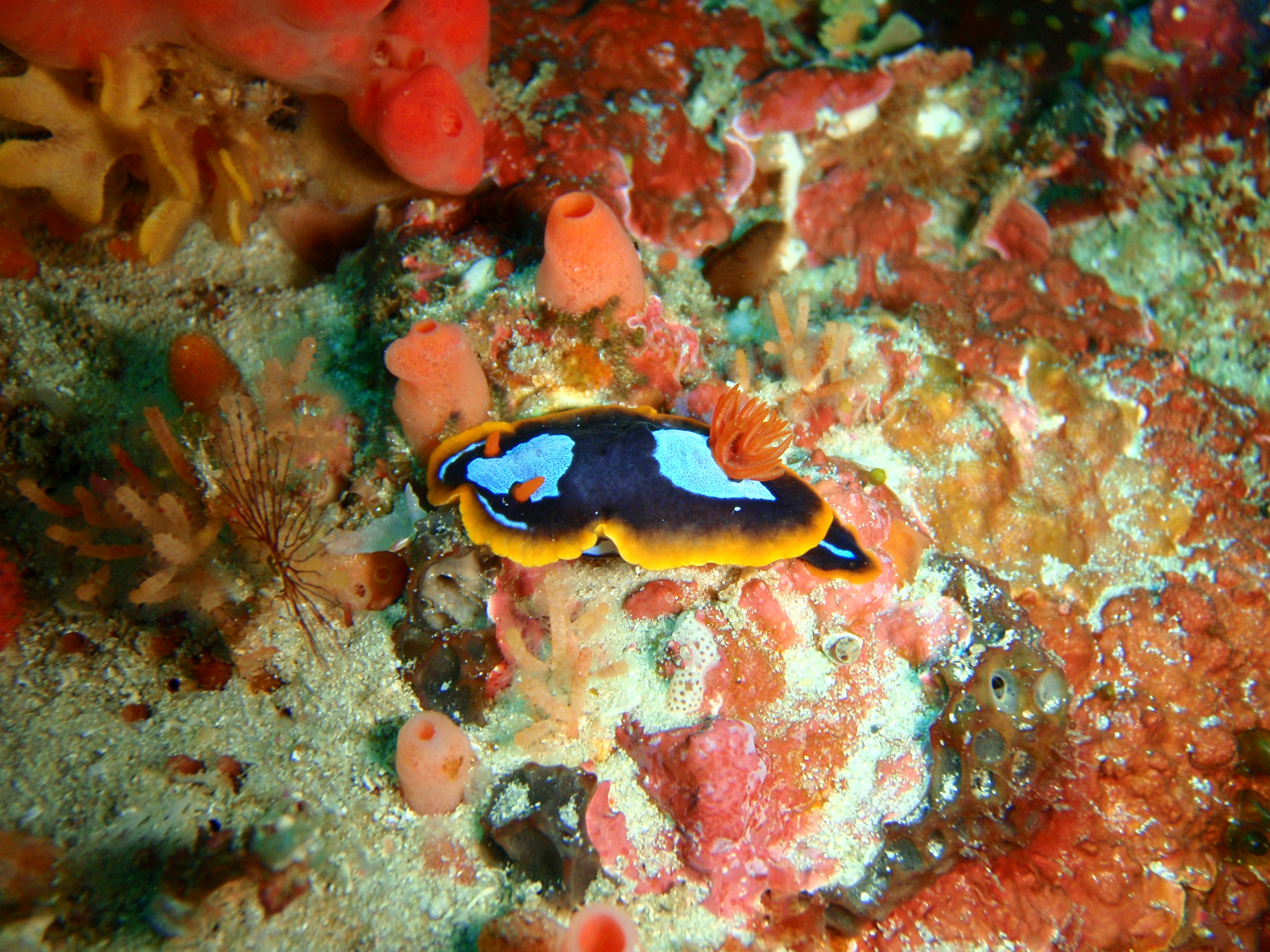

Scientific classification
- Kingdom: Animalia
- Phylum: Mollusca
- Class: Gastropoda
- Order: Nudibranchia
- Family: Chromodorididae
- Genus: Chromodoris
- Species: C. westraliensis

Binomial name
- Chromodoris westraliensis (O'Donoghue, 1924)

Synonyms
- Chromodoris quadricolor westraliensis Burn, 1968; Glossodoris westraliensis O'Donoghue, 1924 (Basionym)

= Chromodoris westraliensis =

Species of gastropod

Chromodoris westraliensis is a species of very colourful sea slug, a dorid nudibranch, a marine gastropod mollusc in the family Chromodorididae.

== Distribution ==
This species of nudibranch occurs in coastal regions of Western Australia, from the Kimberley region in the north of the state, to its southern occurrence near Esperance. It is the most abundant nudibranch of the Perth region.

== Description ==
The length of this animal is up to 65 millimetres. A mantle covers the upper parts of the animal and extends to form a skirt at the sides. The colouring is two (or one) bright blue patches on a black background, with an orange outline. This aposematic coloration advertises its toxicity to would-be predators. Two sensory organs, tentacle shaped rhinophores, are orange, and are located at the upper surface of the head. The gills, clustered and plumose, are also orange and arranged near the anus.

== Ecology ==
These nudibranchs feed on sponges, usually a single species, storing the toxins the sponge contains, in order to deter their own potential predators. This species occurs in shallow waters on partially exposed reefs and at depths up to 18 metres.
