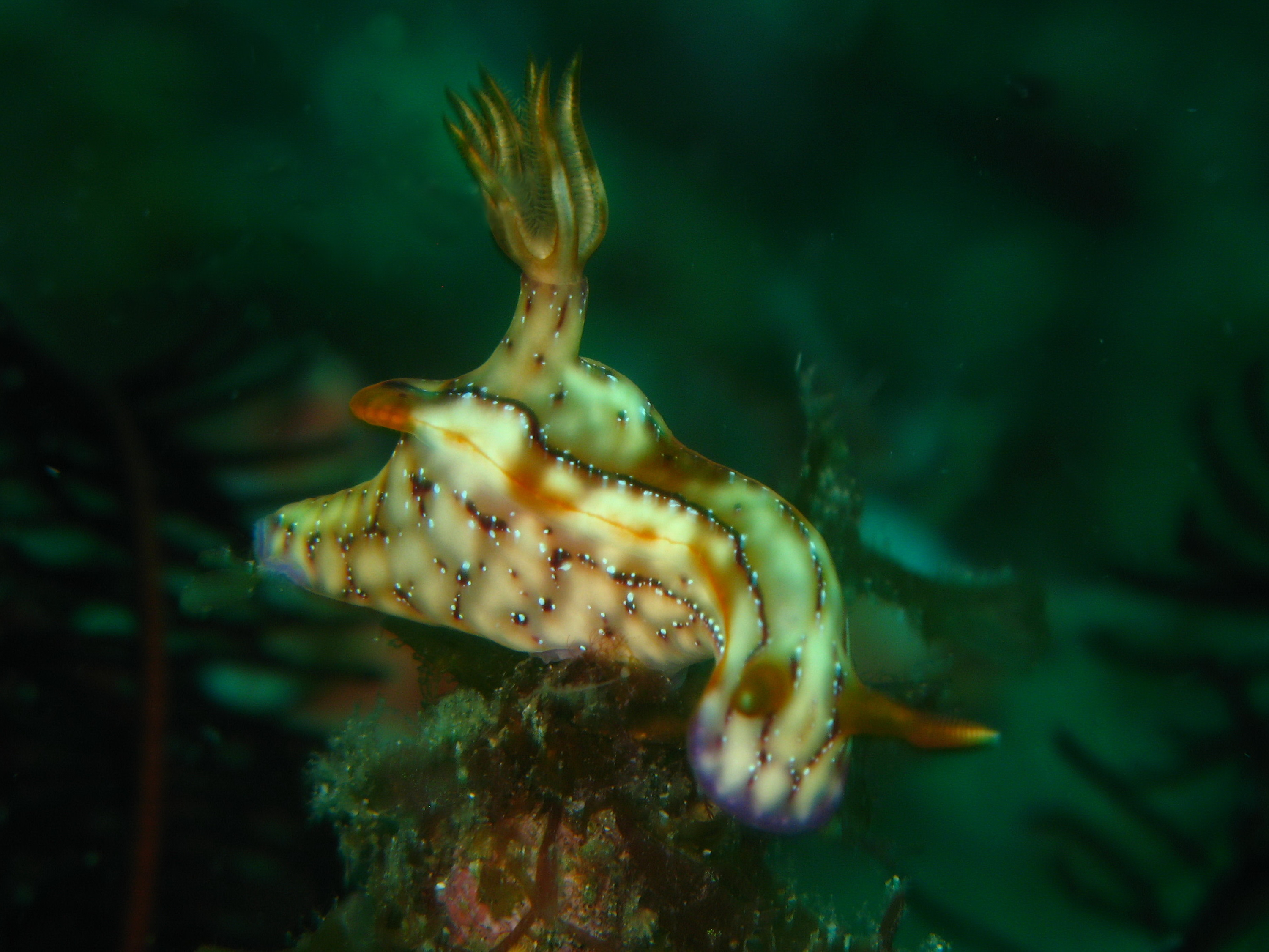

Scientific classification
- Kingdom: Animalia
- Phylum: Mollusca
- Class: Gastropoda
- Order: Nudibranchia
- Family: Chromodorididae
- Genus: Hypselodoris
- Species: H. krakatoa

Binomial name
- Hypselodoris krakatoa Gosliner & Johnson, 1999

= Hypselodoris krakatoa =

Species of gastropod

Hypselodoris krakatoa is a species of sea slug or dorid nudibranch, a marine gastropod mollusk in the family Chromodorididae.

== Distribution ==
The holotype of this nudibranch was described from off southern point, Culebra (Bonito) Island, Batangas, Luzon, Philippines, at 25 m (82 ft) depth. Paratypes from the Philippines, Papua New Guinea and Okinawa were included in the original description. It is reported in the Western Pacific Ocean from Japan to Papua New Guinea. Specimens from Taiwan originally identified as this species are now known to be distinct and named as Hypselodoris cerisae.

== Description ==
Hypselodoris krakatoa has a pale brown-white body and a purplish-blue foot. There are black lines and white spots running in lines across its body and dorsum. The gills are a light-brown colour and its rhinophores are orange-white. This species can reach a total length of at least 55 mm.
