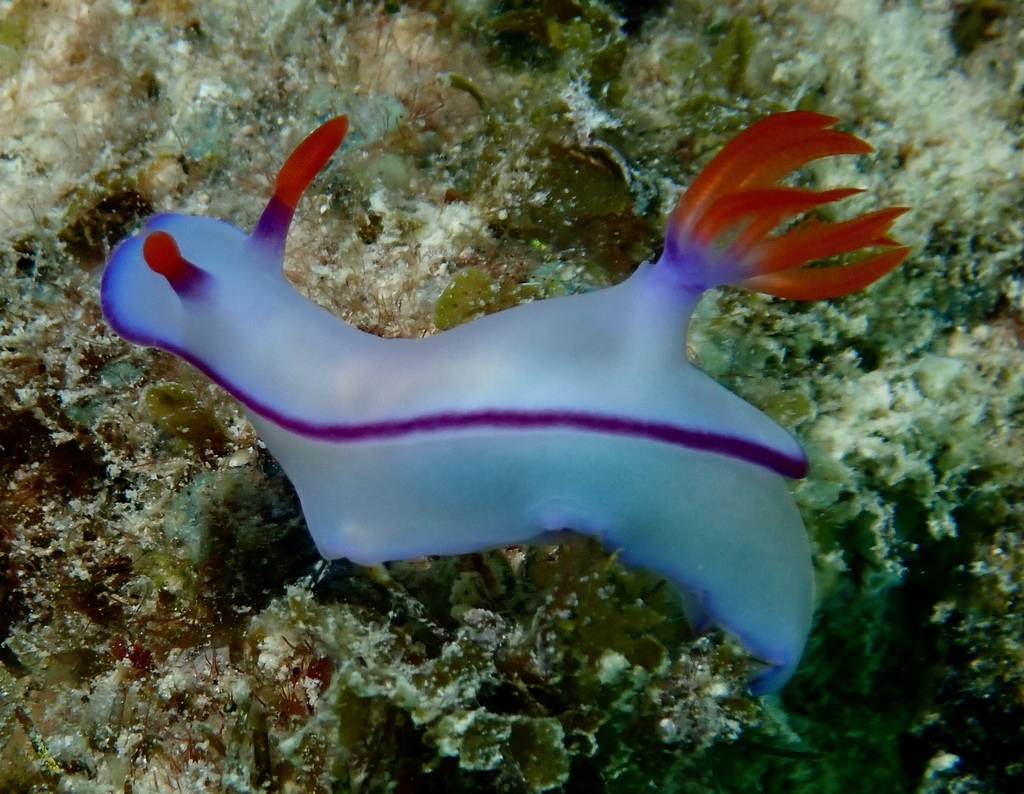

Scientific classification
- Kingdom: Animalia
- Phylum: Mollusca
- Class: Gastropoda
- Order: Nudibranchia
- Family: Chromodorididae
- Genus: Hypselodoris
- Species: H. brycei

Binomial name
- Hypselodoris brycei Gosliner & Johnson, 2018

= Hypselodoris brycei =

Species of gastropod

Hypselodoris brycei is a species of sea slug or dorid nudibranch, a marine gastropod mollusc in the family Chromodorididae.

== Distribution ==
This nudibranch was described from Epsilon Island, Montebello Islands, Western Australia, 20.4513°S 115.5827°E. It is known only from the Houtman Abrolhos Islands to the Exmouth Region and Dampier Archipelago, Western Australia.

== Description ==
Hypselodoris brycei has a translucent white body with a deep violet marginal band and paler violet pigment all over the mantle. The gills and rhinophores are red to orange with a purple base. There is a purple band around the edge of the foot.

This species can reach a total length of at least 50 mm.
