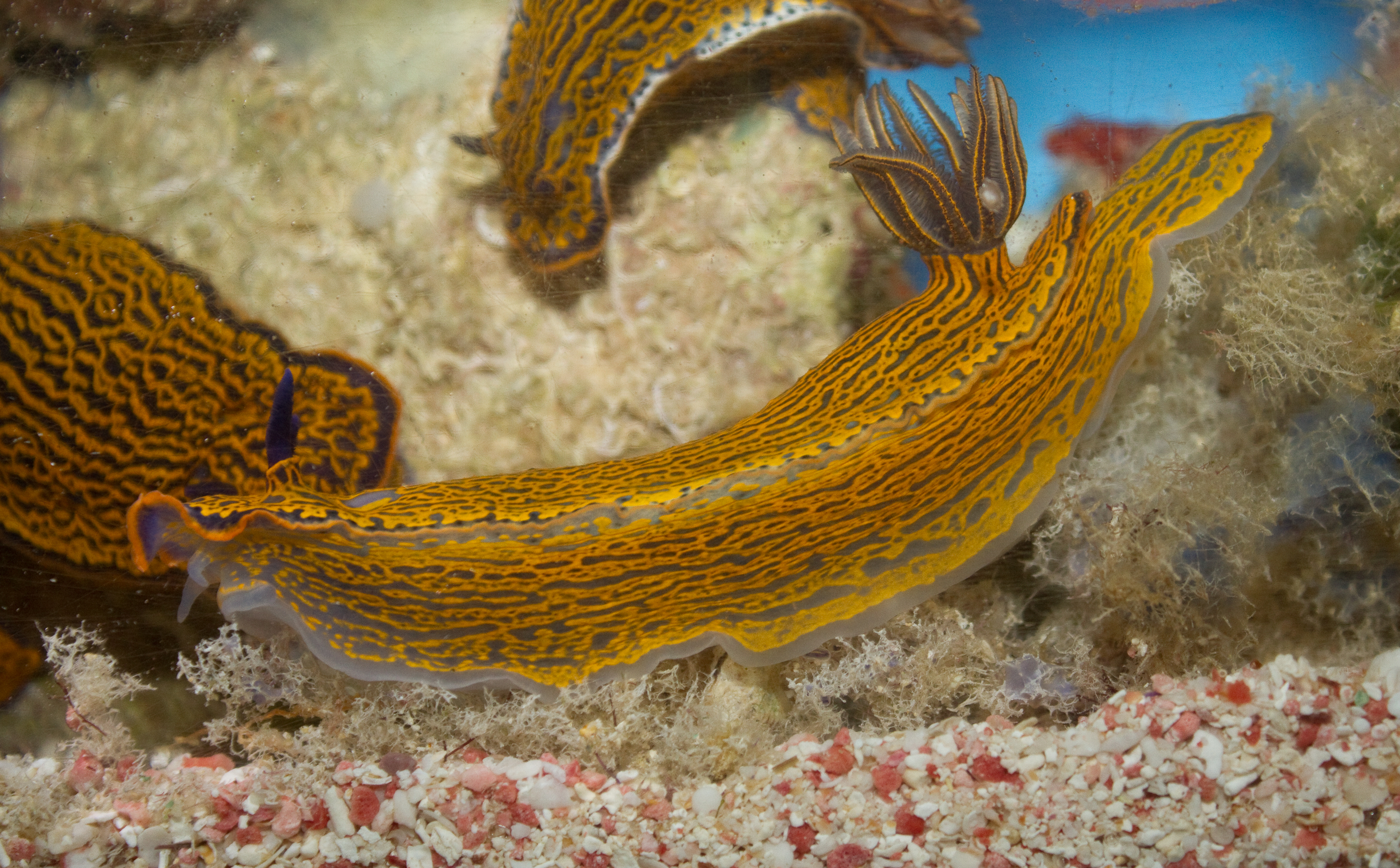

Scientific classification
- Kingdom: Animalia
- Phylum: Mollusca
- Class: Gastropoda
- Order: Nudibranchia
- Family: Chromodorididae
- Genus: Felimare
- Species: F. zebra

Binomial name
- Felimare zebra (Heilprin, 1889)

Synonyms
- Chromodoris zebra Heilprin, 1889 (basionym); Doris scacchii Chiaje, S. delle, 1830, "1822"; Glossodoris zebra Heilprin, A., 1888; Hypselodoris zebra (Heilprin, 1889)

= Felimare zebra =

Species of gastropod

Felimare zebra, common name the zebra doris, is a colourful species of sea slug or dorid nudibranch, a marine gastropod mollusc in the family Chromodorididae.

== Distribution ==
This nudibranch is known only from Bermuda in the Atlantic Ocean.

== Description ==
Felimare zebra is a rather large nudibranch and can reach a total length of at least 180 mm (7.1 in). It has a black body with longitudinal orange lines running along the body and dorsum. Its mantle edge is usually white, sometimes dotted with black spots. The gills are a translucent colour outlined in black, and the rhinophores are completely black. There is some colour variation in this species. Its similarity to Felimare picta was explored in an investigation into the close relationship of Felimare picta, Felimare bayeri, Felimare tema, Felimare lajensis and Felimare zebra.

== Ecology ==
Minimum recorded depth is 1 m and maximum recorded depth is 18 m. This species feeds on the sponge Dysidea etheria.
