= Felimare xicoi =

Scientific classification
- Kingdom: Animalia
- Phylum: Mollusca
- Class: Gastropoda
- Order: Nudibranchia
- Family: Chromodorididae
- Genus: Felimare
- Species: F. xicoi

Binomial name
- Felimare xicoi (Ortea, Valdés & García-Gómez, 1996)

Synonyms
- Hypselodoris xicoi Ortea & Valdés, 1996 (original combination)

Species of gastropod

Felimare xicoi is a species of colourful sea slug or dorid nudibranch, a marine gastropod mollusk in the family Chromodorididae.

== Distribution ==
This species was described from two specimens, a paratype measuring 10 mm (0.39 in) in length from Praia das Conchas, Sao Tomé and a holotype measuring 18 mm (0.71 in) in length from Esprainha, Sao Tomé.

== Description ==
In the 10 mm animal, the back is dark blue, which turns violet towards the edge of the mantle which has an orange margin. A broad midline runs along the back from the rhinophores to the gill, which it surrounds forming a circle, wider ahead. Dark purple blue rhinophores. Gill formed of six leaves, also of uniform violet blue colour. Sides of foot blue, with a white line that goes from behind the genital opening to the beginning of the tail, but without continuing through it. There is a white line on the tail. It has 7 mantle glands behind the gill.

The 18 mm animal has two yellow lines on the back which go from the gill to the head, passing between the rhinophores and joining in an arc in front of them. There is a single yellow line behind the gill. The background color is violet blue, very dark, with large pale blue areas between the edge of the mantle and each of the two yellow lines on the back. Between these two yellow lines the colouration is uniform dark violet blue. The edge of the mantle is orange. In dorsal view it is very thin and uniform, while in side view there are two orange bands with a very dark blue line between them. The lower orange layer disappears at the level of the gill, where mantle glands appear.

The larger animal has two yellow lines on the back, colouration that exists in the adults of Felimare bilineata and some juveniles of this species as well as Felimare malacitana. However Felimare xicoi can be separated from them easily because it lacks yellow pigment in the rhinophores. Related species such as Felimare tricolor and Felimare ciminoi also have plain blue rhinophores, but the latter lacks mantle glands, very abundant in Felimare xicoi.
