= Felimare ciminoi =

Scientific classification
- Kingdom: Animalia
- Phylum: Mollusca
- Class: Gastropoda
- Order: Nudibranchia
- Family: Chromodorididae
- Genus: Felimare
- Species: F. ciminoi

Binomial name
- Felimare ciminoi (Ortea & Valdés, 1996)

Synonyms
- Hypselodoris ciminoi Ortea & Valdés, 1996 (basionym)

Species of gastropod

Felimare ciminoi is a species of colourful sea slug or dorid nudibranch, a marine gastropod mollusc in the family Chromodorididae.

== Distribution ==
This species was described from Bonfin, southern Angola in the Atlantic Ocean.

== Description ==
The back has two parallel lines of yellow-orange colour, which go from the gill to the rhinophores, without passing between them, but continuing in an arc in front. The two lines surround the gill and continue as a single line behind. The general colour of the body is light blue, with a darker zone between the two yellow lines on the back. Edge of the mantle surrounded by a yellow-orange line. The tail has the same blue color as the back, with three irregular lines of light orange. The sides of the foot have the same general colour as the back, with several elongated yellow-orange spots. Rhinophores of uniform dark blue colour, without any yellow pigment. Seven gill leaves of uniform dark blue color, arranged in a circle around the anus. No mantle glands visible.

This species can be characterised by the pattern of yellow-orange lines on the back and flanks, the absence of mantle glands and the acicular form of the rodlets of the labial armature. The structure of the radula teeth, which show a progressive growth along the row, makes it possible to differentiate it from Felimare gofasi, which also does not have mantle glands and whose outer lateral teeth are smaller than the inner ones. The lack of yellow pigment in the rhinophores allows the visual differentiation of this species from other animals of the North Atlantic with two lines on the back. Felimare xicoi also has uniform blue rhinophores and a similar dorsal design, but has mantle glands which, in addition to other internal differences, clearly separate it from Felimare ciminoi.
