= Felimare sechurana =

Scientific classification
- Kingdom: Animalia
- Phylum: Mollusca
- Class: Gastropoda
- Order: Nudibranchia
- Family: Chromodorididae
- Genus: Felimare
- Species: F. sechurana

Binomial name
- Felimare sechurana Hoover, Padula, Schrödl, Hooker & Valdés, 2017

Species of gastropod

Felimare sechurana is a species of sea slug or droid nudibranch, a marine gastropod mollusc in the family Chromodorididae.

== Distribution ==
This species was described from a holotype collected at Isla Foca (5°12′13.8″S 81°12′38.0″W), Piura, Peru on 25 March 2013 (length 18 mm (0.71 in) preserved) and four paratypes with the largest measuring 40 mm (1.6 in) from the same locality.

== Description ==
This species was previously identified as Felimare ghiselini, a synonym of Felimare californiensis. It is dark blue in colour densely covered with orange spots on the mantle and foot and with pale blue-white spots scattered between the orange spots or merging at the mantle and foot edges. It reaches 64 mm (2.5 in) in length.
