= Felimare fregona =

Scientific classification
- Kingdom: Animalia
- Phylum: Mollusca
- Class: Gastropoda
- Order: Nudibranchia
- Superfamily: Chromodoridoidea
- Family: Chromodorididae
- Genus: Felimare
- Species: F. fregona

Binomial name
- Felimare fregona (Ortea & Caballer, 2013)

Synonyms
- Hypselodoris fregona Ortea & Caballer, 2013

Species of gastropod

Felimare fregona is a species of sea slug, a dorid nudibranch, a shell-less marine gastropod mollusk in the family Chromodorididae.

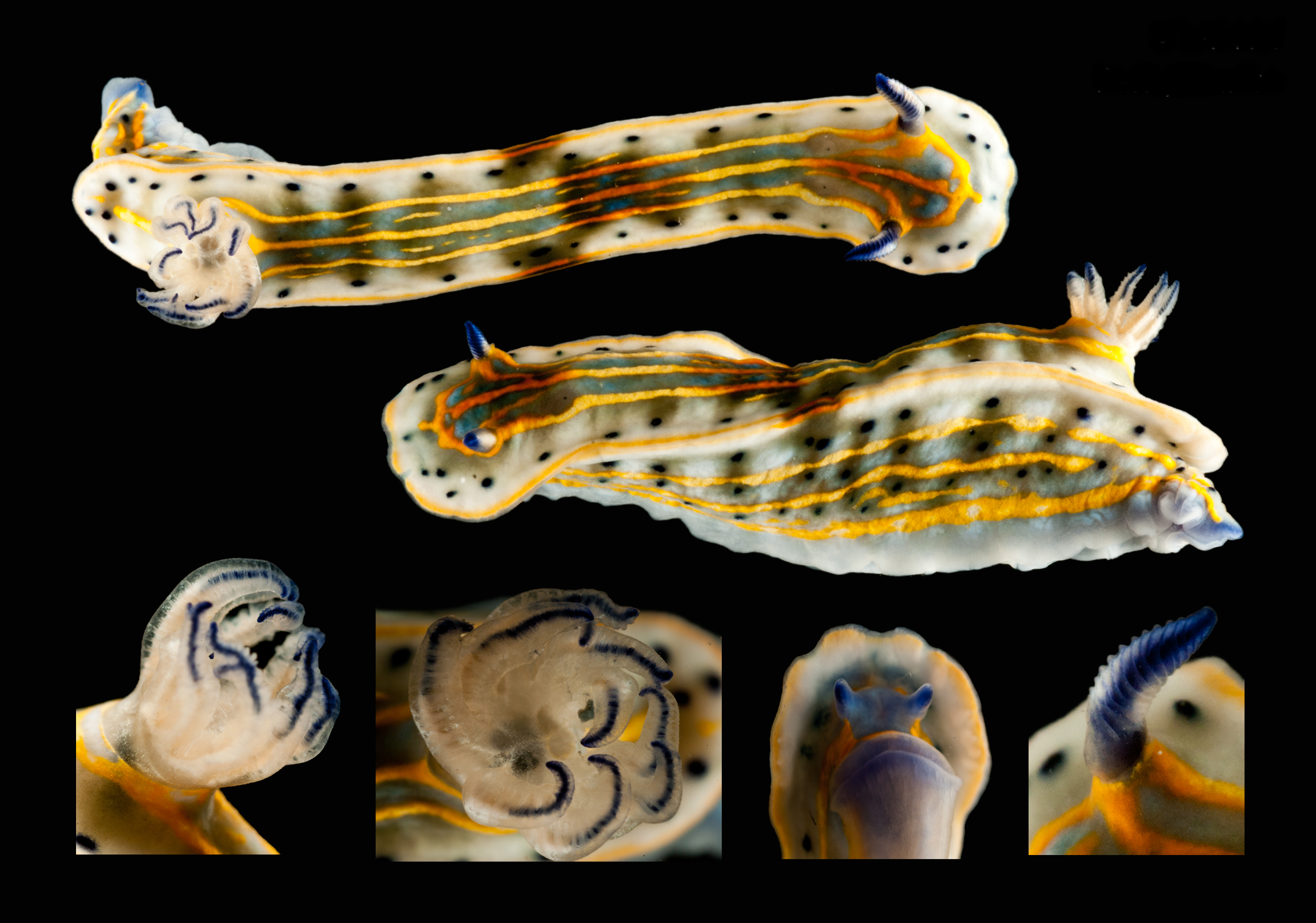
Holotype of Hypselodoris fregona, Pointe sur baie de Baille Argent, 16°15’N 61°48’W), Guadeloupe, May 12, 2012.

== Taxonomy ==
This species was described under the name Hypselodoris fregona from the Caribbean Sea in 2013. Although Johnson & Gosliner transferred all eastern Pacific, Atlantic and Mediterranean species of Hypselodoris to the genus Felimare in 2012, the authors of this species argue against this decision.

== Distribution ==
This species was described from Pointe sur baie de Baille Argent, Guadeloupe, 16°15′N 61°48′W. Distribution of Felimare fregona includes Venezuela, Puerto Rico, Virgin Islands, Curaçao, Guadeloupe and Panama.

== Description ==
The body is elongate, narrow, with the posterior portion of foot extending beyond the mantle margin. Background color is white with irregular shades of pale blue and gray. Dorsum is with three longitudinal yellow lines. Mantle margin is edged by an opaque white line with a narrow submarginal band of yellow and a series of black circular spots. Rhinophores are white with a purple longitudinal line up from the base. It is up to 40 mm long.

== Ecology ==
Felimare fregona feeds on a blue sponge.
