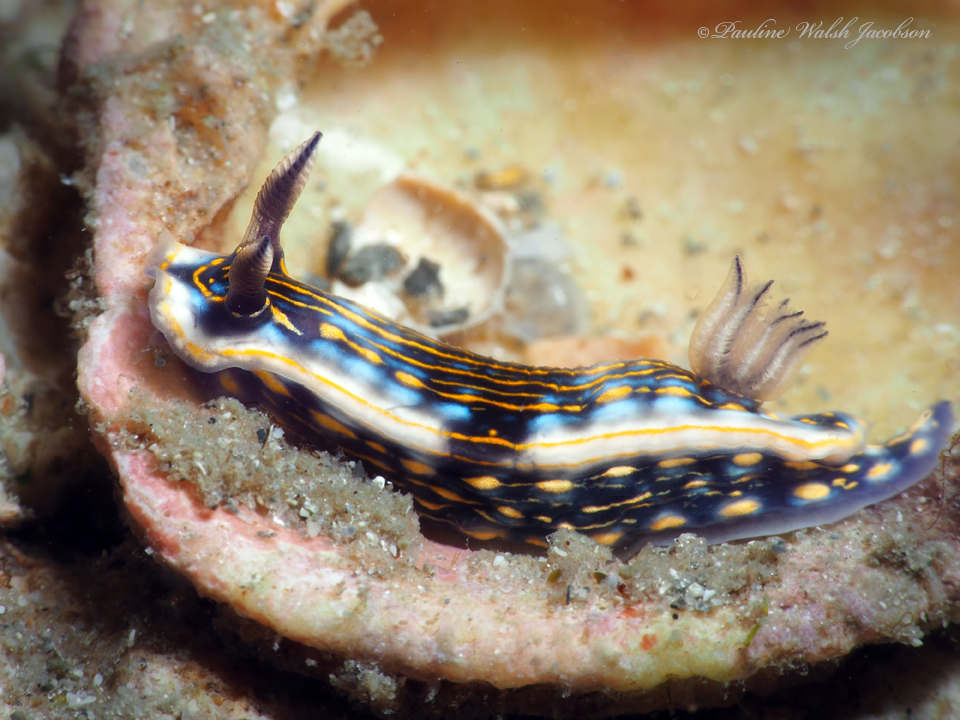

Scientific classification
- Kingdom: Animalia
- Phylum: Mollusca
- Class: Gastropoda
- Order: Nudibranchia
- Family: Chromodorididae
- Genus: Felimare
- Species: F. ruthae

Binomial name
- Felimare ruthae (Marcus & Hughes, 1974)

Synonyms
- Hypselodoris ruthae Ev. Marcus & Hughes, 1974 (basionym)

= Felimare ruthae =

Species of gastropod

Felimare ruthae is a colourful species of sea slug or dorid nudibranch, a marine gastropod mollusk in the family Chromodorididae.

== Distribution ==
This nudibranch is known from the Caribbean. and the Gulf of Mexico.

== Description ==
Felimare ruthae has a blue-black body with a yellow-lined mantle and yellow longitudinal lines and bright-blue striations on its dorsum. The gills are typically translucent outlined with black and the rhinophores are black with a yellow-white line running vertically.

This species can reach a total length of at least 25 mm and has been observed feeding on the sponge Dysidea etheria.

== Habitat ==
Minimum recorded depth is 1 m (3 ft 3 in) and maximum recorded depth is 12 m (39 ft).
