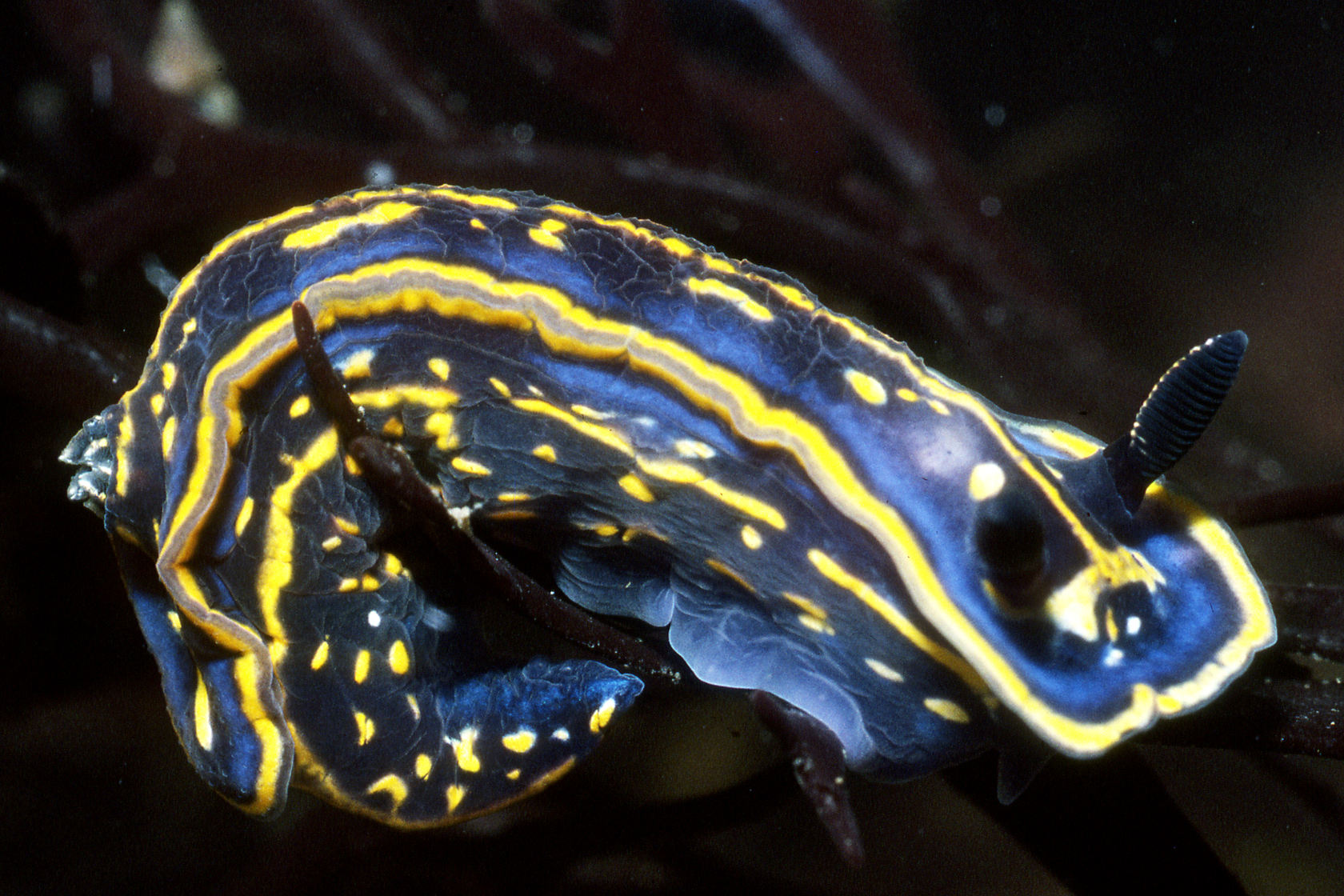
- Felimare cantabrica

Scientific classification
- Kingdom: Animalia
- Phylum: Mollusca
- Class: Gastropoda
- Order: Nudibranchia
- Family: Chromodorididae
- Genus: Felimare
- Species: F. cantabrica

Binomial name
- Felimare cantabrica (Bouchet & Ortea, 1980)

Synonyms
- Hypselodoris cantabrica Bouchet & Ortea, 1980 (basionym)

= Felimare cantabrica =

Species of gastropod

Felimare cantabrica is a species of colourful sea slug or dorid nudibranch, a marine gastropod mollusc in the family Chromodorididae.

== Distribution ==
This nudibranch is found in the Eastern Atlantic Ocean (Bay of Biscay) and the Atlantic coasts of Spain and Portugal.

== Description ==
Felimare cantabrica has a light and dark blue body, flecked with yellow lines and spots. Its mantle edge is lined with yellow-light blue-yellow banding. The gills and rhinophores are purple.

This species can reach a total length of at least 40 mm and has been observed feeding on sponges from the genus Dysidea.
