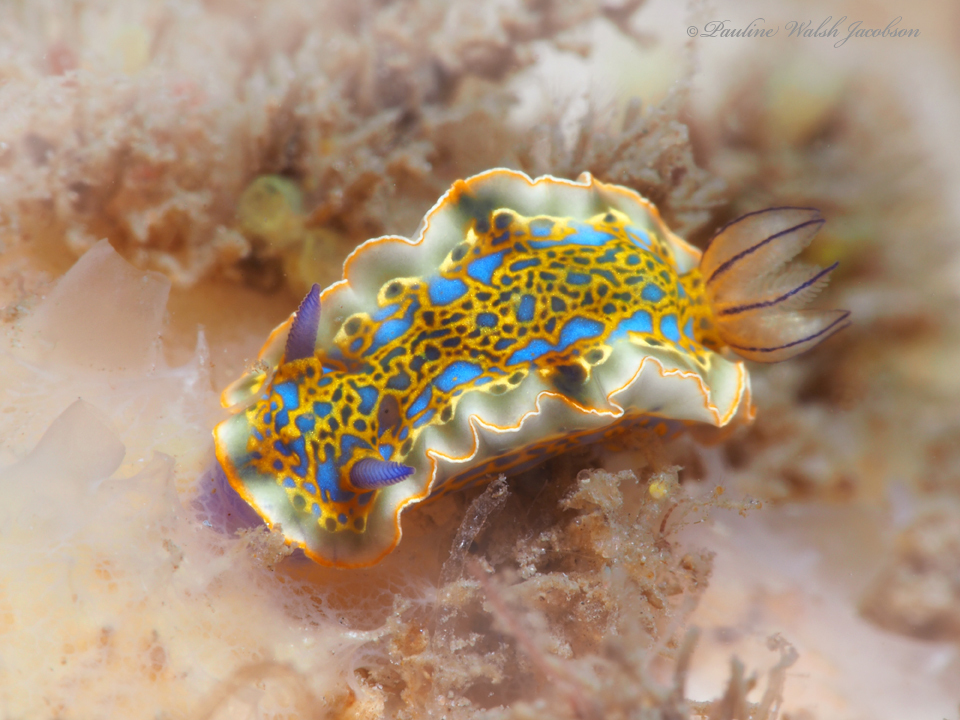

Scientific classification
- Kingdom: Animalia
- Phylum: Mollusca
- Class: Gastropoda
- Order: Nudibranchia
- Family: Chromodorididae
- Genus: Felimare
- Species: F. acriba

Binomial name
- Felimare acriba Er. Marcus & Ev. Marcus, 1967

Synonyms
- Hypselodoris acriba Er. Marcus & Ev. Marcus, 1967 (basionym)

= Felimare acriba =

Species of gastropod

Felimare acriba is a species of colourful sea slug or dorid nudibranch, a marine gastropod mollusk in the family Chromodorididae.

== Distribution ==
This nudibranch is known only from the Caribbean.

== Description ==
Felimare acriba has a blue body which is covered in a yellow-gold mesh pattern with a series of black spots towards the edges of the mantle. The very edge of the mantle is yellow, with a thin red line inside this, then a more diffuse area of pink to white The rhinophores are purple-blue and the deeply indented mantle and gills are a gold-brown colour. The maximum recorded length is 60 mm.

== Habitat ==
Minimum recorded depth is 4 m. Maximum recorded depth is 26 m.
