= Felimare pinna =

Scientific classification
- Kingdom: Animalia
- Phylum: Mollusca
- Class: Gastropoda
- Order: Nudibranchia
- Family: Chromodorididae
- Genus: Felimare
- Species: F. pinna

Binomial name
- Felimare pinna (Ortea, 1988)

Synonyms
- Hypselodoris pinna Ortea, 1988

Species of gastropod

Felimare pinna is a species of sea slug or dorid nudibranch, a marine gastropod mollusc in the family Chromodorididae. Transferred to the genus Felimare according to the hypothesis that all Atlantic species which were formerly Hypselodoris belong in that genus.

== Distribution ==
This species was described from Baía do Galeão, Maio, Cape Verde with additional specimens from Boavista.

== Description ==
Felimare pinna is dark blue with a wide longitudinal white band in the middle of the back. The sides of this band have quadrangular expansions in the form of battlements, alternating with areas of very dark blue colour in which there are conspicuous white spots. The middle white band reaches the rhinophores or penetrates between them and surrounds the gill behind. In the larger specimens, the white band tends to fade and loses its uniform opaque white tone due to the appearance of brownish tones disintegrating it. In front of the rhinophores the mantle is dark blue with elongated white specks. The tail is also blue, with a median stripe of orange colour and little white spots that become smaller towards the foot. The edge of the mantle has a thin orange line above and one below, delimiting a dark blue zone between them.

The rhinophores are blue with opaque white spots in the lower two thirds and uniformly white in the upper third, whilst the gill leaves have the lower third blue and the rest white. The rachis is also white. In the smallest animal studied (2 mm) there were 5 gill leaves and in the largest (25 mm) 10 leaves. After the gill the mantle narrows. The hyponotum is dark blue with white spots on the upper part and yellowish-white spots near the foot; in larger individuals there is always a greater abundance of yellow spots. At the genital opening there is always a series of large spots and numerous small spots underneath it. In the older and larger specimens, the dark blue of the mantle takes on a brownish hue.
