= Felimare sycilla =

Scientific classification
- Kingdom: Animalia
- Phylum: Mollusca
- Class: Gastropoda
- Order: Nudibranchia
- Family: Chromodorididae
- Genus: Felimare
- Species: F. sycilla

Binomial name
- Felimare sycilla (Bergh, 1890)

Synonyms
- Chromodoris sycilla Bergh, 1890 (original combination); Hypselodoris sycilla (Bergh, 1890)

Species of gastropod

Felimare sycilla is a species of colourful sea slug or dorid nudibranch, a marine gastropod mollusk in the family Chromodorididae.

== Distribution ==
This species occurs in the Caribbean Sea and the Gulf of Mexico.

== Description ==
The maximum recorded body length is 25 mm (0.98 in).

== Habitat ==
Minimum recorded depth is 0 m (0 ft) and maximum recorded depth is 26 m (85 ft).
