= Felimare juliae =

Scientific classification
- Kingdom: Animalia
- Phylum: Mollusca
- Class: Gastropoda
- Order: Nudibranchia
- Family: Chromodorididae
- Genus: Felimare
- Species: F. juliae

Binomial name
- Felimare juliae (DaCosta, Padula & Schrödl, 2010)

Synonyms
- Hypselodoris juliae DaCosta, Padula & Schrödl, 2010

Species of gastropod

Felimare juliae is a species of sea slug or dorid nudibranch, a marine gastropod mollusc in the family Chromodorididae.

== Distribution ==
This species was described from a specimen measuring 57 mm (2.2 in) collected intertidally at Praia das Conchas, Cabo Frio, state of Rio de Janeiro, Brazil, 22°52′15″S 41°58′52″W and a paratype, from Ilha dos Papagaios, Cabo Frio 22°53′49″S 41°59′02″W. Reported from Florida and probably present at intermediate localities in the western Atlantic Ocean.

== Description ==
Felimare juliae is similar in appearance to Felimare picta with a dark blue background colour but is densely covered on the mantle and foot with fine longitudinal orange lines. The mantle has a frilly edge with a marginal orange line enclosing a series of larger pale blue spots and pale blue spots occur amongst the orange lines.
