= Felimare espinosai =

Scientific classification
- Kingdom: Animalia
- Phylum: Mollusca
- Class: Gastropoda
- Order: Nudibranchia
- Family: Chromodorididae
- Genus: Felimare
- Species: F. espinosai

Binomial name
- Felimare espinosai (Ortea, Valdés & García-Gómez, 1996)

Synonyms
- Hypselodoris espinosai Ortea & Valdés, 1996 (basionym)

Species of gastropod

Felimare espinosai is a species of colourful sea slug or dorid nudibranch, a marine gastropod mollusc in the family Chromodorididae.

== Distribution ==
This species was described from Puerto Morelos, Quintana Roo, Mexico in the Atlantic Ocean, 20.837793°N 86.873897°W. Reported from Saint Martin and St. Vincent and the Grenadines.

== Description ==
The back is very dark blue. The edge of the mantle has a thin yellow dorsal line and a white ventral line, which leave a wide middle area between dark blue. There are three yellow lines along the back which end in the gill, without surrounding it, and in front the most external climb the rhinophore sheath and continue down in front of it, joining on the head where they form an arch. The middle line passes between the rhinophores and stops, without connecting with the arch formed by the outer lines. There is an irregular yellow pattern behind the gill. Between the lines of the edge of the mantle and the outer ridges there are conspicuous bright blue spots, which have a rounded shape behind the gill. There are 8-9 mantle glands in the back of the body and up to 5 in the anterior. In the larger specimen there are also bright blue spots between the three yellow lines on the back.

Gill formed by 9 leaves of grayish blue color, all with the upper region of the external rachis white. Rhinophores somewhat flattened laterally, stained white behind the rachis and yellow ahead. Sides of the foot with a continuous yellow line in the middle zone and a fragmented one below it. In the larger animal there are elongated yellow spots between the two. The lines of the foot continue on the tail but do not link with the mid dorsal stria present on it.

== Habitat ==
The original specimens were found at 4 m (13 ft) depth on the fringing coral reef. Species of Felimare feed on sponges of the family Dysideidae.
