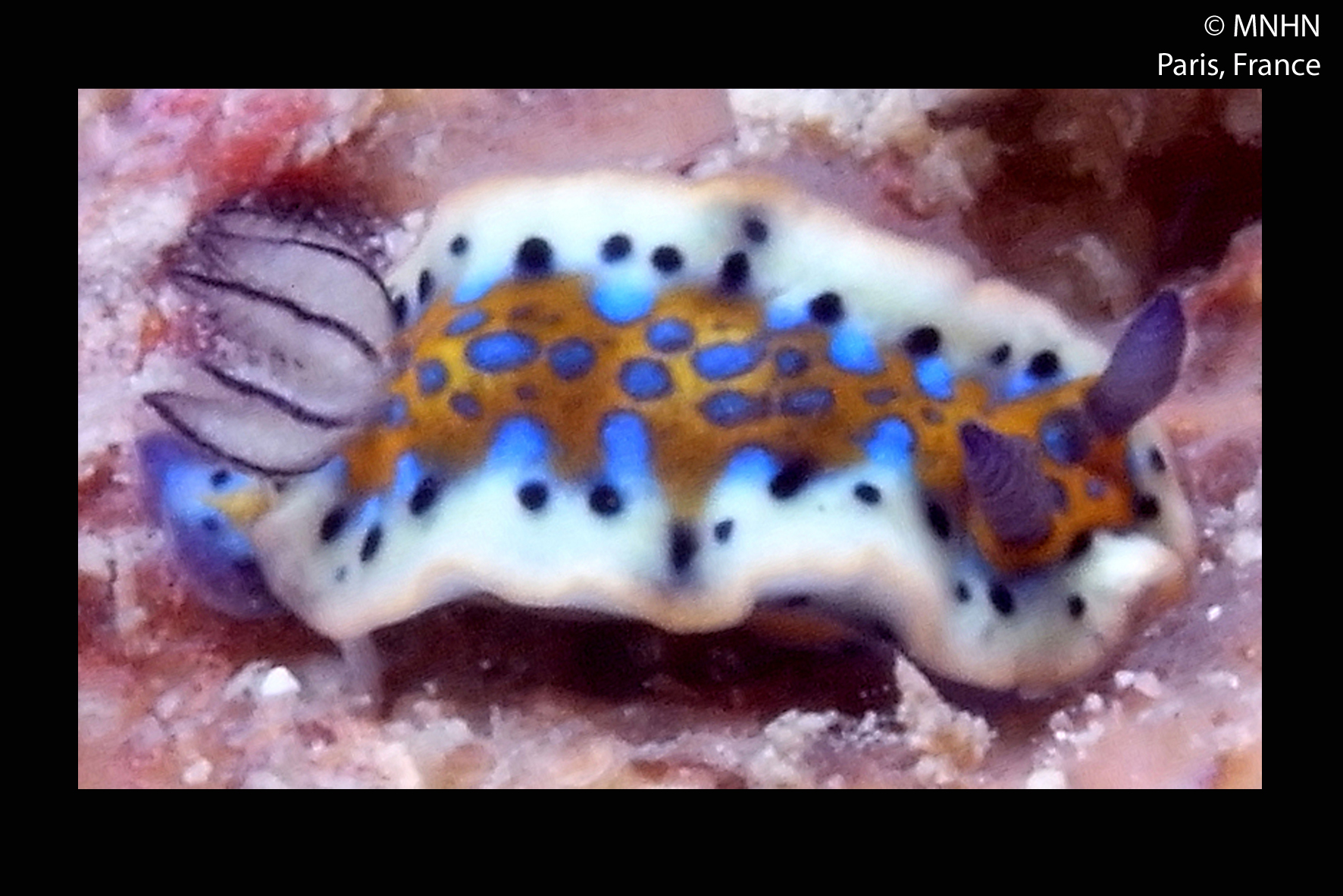
- Shell of Felimare fortunensis (holotype at MNHN, Paris)

Scientific classification
- Kingdom: Animalia
- Phylum: Mollusca
- Class: Gastropoda
- Order: Nudibranchia
- Superfamily: Chromodoridoidea
- Family: Chromodorididae
- Genus: Felimare
- Species: F. fortunensis

Binomial name
- Felimare fortunensis (Ortea, Espinosa & Buske, 2013)

Synonyms
- Hypselodoris fortunensis Ortea, Espinosa & Buske, 2013

= Felimare fortunensis =

Species of gastropod

Felimare fortunensis is a species of sea slug or dorid nudibranch, a marine gastropod mollusc in the family Chromodorididae.

== Distribution ==
This species was described from a specimen measuring 11 mm (0.43 in) collected at 6–22 m (20–72 ft) depth at Pointe Rivière Goyave, Guadeloupe, 16°08′23.98″N 61°32′59.46″W and a juvenile, 3 mm (0.12 in) long, from Port Louis, Guadeloupe.
