= Felimare lapislazuli =

Scientific classification
- Kingdom: Animalia
- Phylum: Mollusca
- Class: Gastropoda
- Order: Nudibranchia
- Family: Chromodorididae
- Genus: Felimare
- Species: F. lapislazuli

Binomial name
- Felimare lapislazuli (Bertsch & Ferreira, 1971)

Synonyms
- Hypselodoris lapislazuli (Bertsch & Ferreira, 1974); Thorunna lapislazuli Bertsch & Ferreira, 1974 (basionym)

Species of gastropod

Felimare lapislazuli is a species of sea slug or dorid nudibranch, a marine gastropod mollusk in the family Chromodorididae.

== Distribution ==
This nudibranch is known only from the Galapagos Islands.

== Description ==
Felimare lapislazuli has a black body covered in yellow and blue spots and a white mantle edge. The gills are white and the rhinophores exhibit the same pattern as the body. This species can reach a total length of at least 50 mm (2.0 in).
