= Felimare lilyeveae =

Scientific classification
- Kingdom: Animalia
- Phylum: Mollusca
- Class: Gastropoda
- Order: Nudibranchia
- Family: Chromodorididae
- Genus: Felimare
- Species: F. lilyeveae

Binomial name
- Felimare lilyeveae (Alejandrino & Valdés, 2006)

Synonyms
- Hypselodoris lilyeveae Alejandrino & Valdés, 2006 (original combination)

Species of gastropod

Felimare lilyeveae is a species of colourful sea slug or dorid nudibranch, a marine gastropod mollusk in the family Chromodorididae.

== Distribution ==
This species occurs in the Caribbean Sea and off the Lesser Antilles.

== Description ==
The maximum recorded body length is 26 mm (1.0 in).

== Habitat ==
Reported from 12–18 m (39–59 ft) depth.
