= Felimare aurantimaculata =

Scientific classification
- Kingdom: Animalia
- Phylum: Mollusca
- Class: Gastropoda
- Order: Nudibranchia
- Family: Chromodorididae
- Genus: Felimare
- Species: F. aurantimaculata

Binomial name
- Felimare aurantimaculata Ortigosa, Pola & Cervera, 2017

Species of gastropod

Felimare aurantimaculata is a species of sea slug or dorid nudibranch, a marine gastropod mollusc in the family Chromodorididae.

== Distribution ==
This species was described from a specimen measuring 30 mm (1.2 in) collected at Tarrafal, Cape Verde, 15.278°N 23.752°W in 2009 and a paratype specimen 50 mm (2.0 in) long, from 23 m (75 ft) depth at the same locality in 2011.

== Description ==
Felimare aurantimaculata is similar to some specimens of Felimare picta. It is dark blue in colour with slightly raised round orange spots all over the mantle and foot. At the edge of the mantle a series of white glands are visible as raised swellings.
