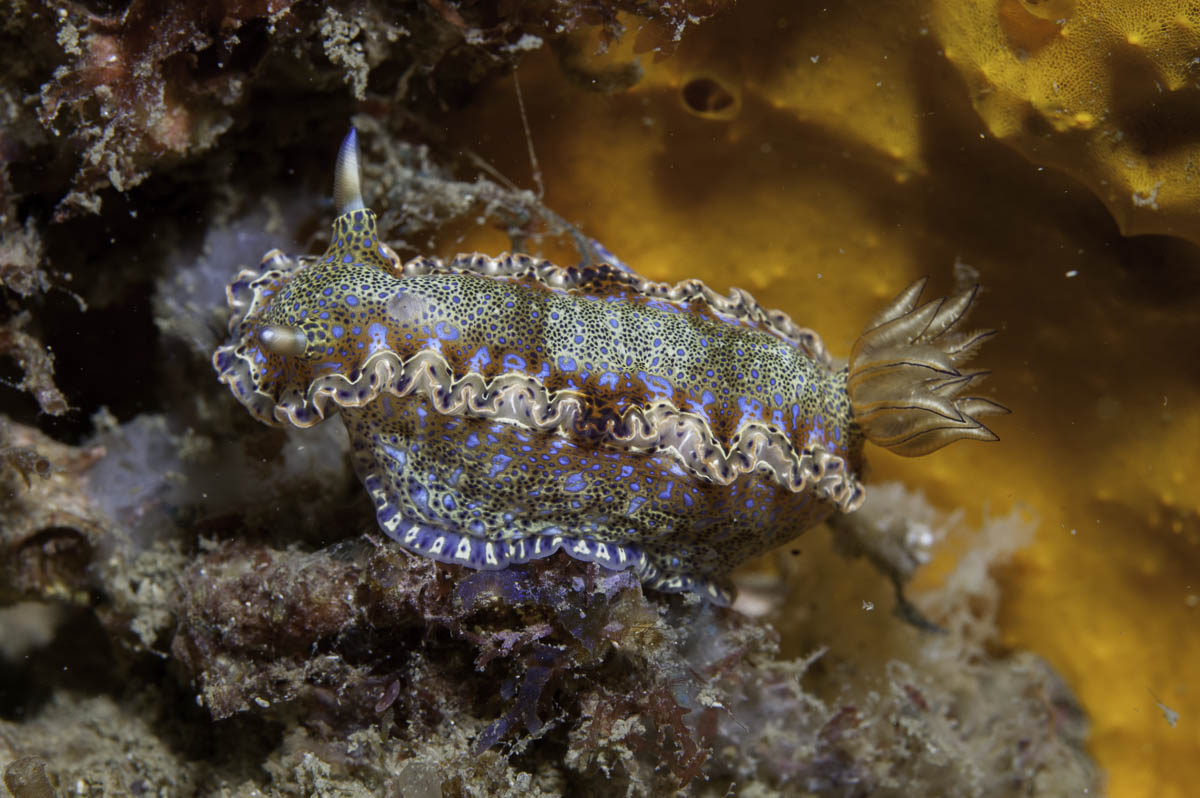
- The nudibranch Felimare marci, Cabo Frio, Brazil.

Scientific classification
- Kingdom: Animalia
- Phylum: Mollusca
- Class: Gastropoda
- Order: Nudibranchia
- Family: Chromodorididae
- Genus: Felimare
- Species: F. marci

Binomial name
- Felimare marci (Ev. Marcus, 1970)

Synonyms
- Hypselodoris marci Ev. Marcus, 1970

= Felimare marci =

Species of gastropod

Felimare marci is a species of sea slug or dorid nudibranch, a marine gastropod mollusc in the family Chromodorididae. Placement of this species in Felimare is based on molecular (DNA) evidence.

== Distribution ==
This nudibranch is found in the Western Atlantic Ocean and the Caribbean from Brazil to Venezuela. It was described from northern Brazil (4.7667°S 35.4014°W) and Venezuela (11.9525°N 66.8333°W). It was also identified by Marcus from Ilha dos Porcos, Cabo Frio in southern Brazil.

== Description ==
Felimare marci has a body colour of pale yellow-green covered by bright blue spots of various shapes and sizes. In the centre of the back the spots are round and form a regular pattern of numerous dark spots interspersed with larger bright blue spots. Towards the edge of the mantle the ground colour changes to red-brown and the blue spots become irregular, broken, blue rings. There is a contorted triple edge to the mantle with a pale yellow extreme margin to the upper and lower rims and a pale orange submarginal line on the middle rim. The rhinophores have a pale blue base and a white club grading to blue at the tip. The gills are translucent white with a blue line on the inner and outer faces. Two orange lines run parallel with the blue line from the base to midway up the gill on the outer face. The edge of the foot has a different pattern, of alternating blue and white patches with dark blue spots.

(description of the synonym) Hypselodoris marci has a golden-brown body covered with many small blue or black spots. It has a white or pale orange mantle. The gills and rhinophores are also white or pale orange, the gills outlined with and the rhinophores tipped with a black-blue colour. There is some colour variation between individuals in this species. The maximum recorded length is 52 mm.

== Ecology ==
This species feeds on a grey species of the sponge Dysidea.
