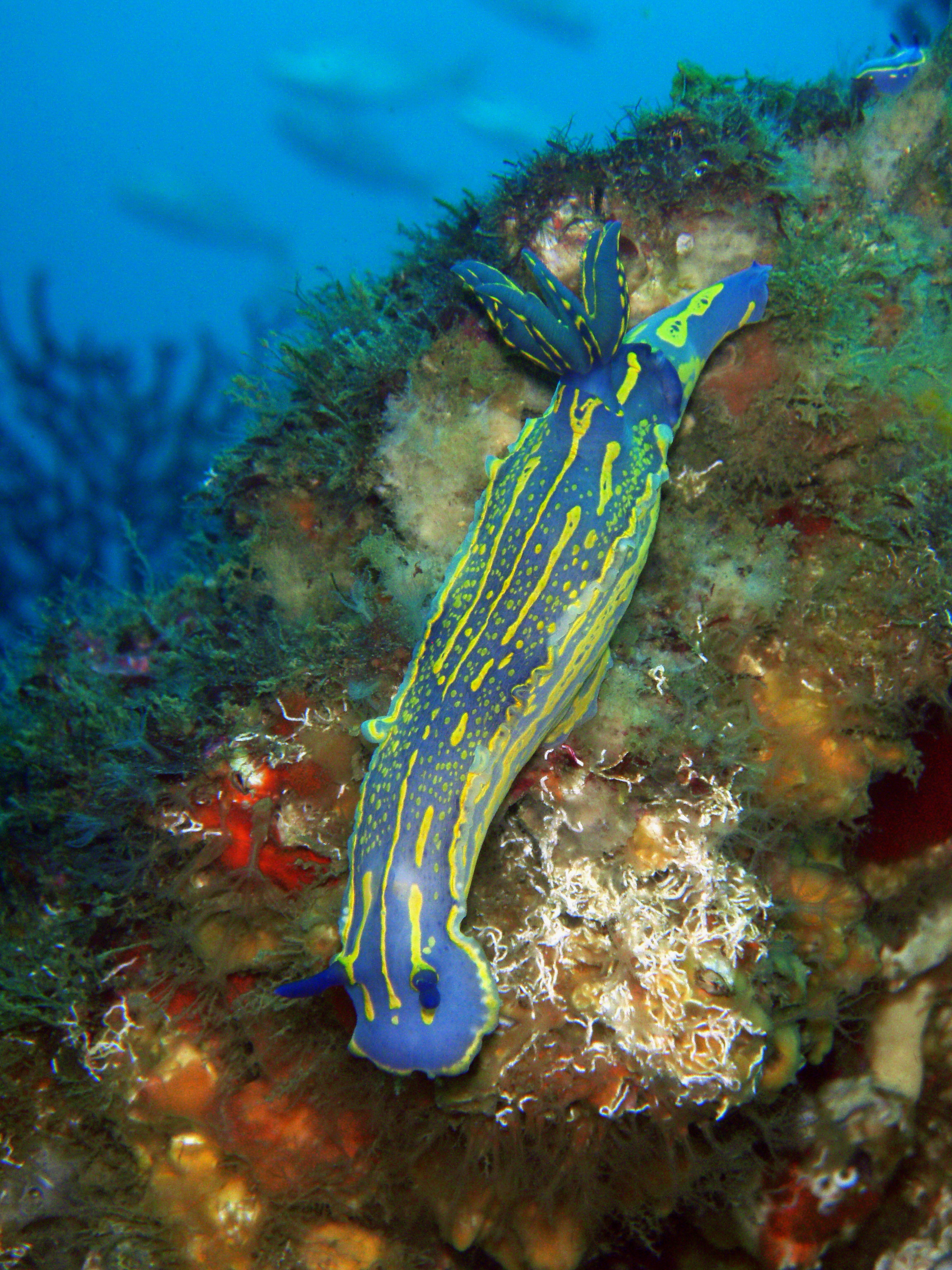
- Felimare picta on SS Rosslyn, Gibraltar

Scientific classification
- Kingdom: Animalia
- Phylum: Mollusca
- Class: Gastropoda
- Order: Nudibranchia
- Infraorder: Doridoidei
- Superfamily: Chromodoridoidea
- Family: Chromodorididae
- Genus: Felimare; Ev. Marcus & Er. Marcus, 1967

Type species
- Felimare bayeri Ev. Marcus & Er. Marcus, 1967

= Felimare =

Genus of gastropods

Felimare is a genus of sea slugs, dorid nudibranchs, shell-less marine gastropod molluscs in the subfamily Miamirinae of the family Chromodorididae.

== Taxonomic history ==
Felimare was described by Eveline & Ernst Marcus in 1967 but treated as a synonym of Hypselodoris until 2012 when it was brought back into use for an eastern Pacific, Atlantic and Mediterranean clade revealed by molecular (DNA) techniques.

Since then it has been somewhat controversial genus, as the 2012 molecular analysis did not take any morphological characteristics into clarification, either external or internal, resulting in little to no diagnostic material to define the genus. In 2025, several of the smaller Felimare species were investigated using both molecular phylogenetic analysis and morphological analysis, and subsequently moved into a new genus, Neptunazurea.

== Species ==
- Felimare acriba Ev. Marcus & Er. Marcus, 1967
- Felimare agassizii Bergh, 1894
- Felimare alaini Ortea, Espinosa & Buske, 2013
- Felimare amalguae Gosliner & Bertsch, 1988
- Felimare aurantimaculata Ortigosa, Pola & Cervera, 2017
- Felimare bayeri Ev. Marcus & Er. Marcus, 1967
- Felimare bilineata Pruvot-Fol, 1953
- Felimare californiensis Bergh, 1879
- Felimare cantabrica Bouchet & Ortea, 1980
- Felimare ciminoi Ortea & Valdés, 1996
- Felimare espinosai Ortea & Valdés, 1996
- Felimare fontandraui Pruvot-Fol, 1951
- Felimare fortunensis Ortea, Espinosa & Buske, 2013
- Felimare fregona Ortea & Caballer, 2013
- Felimare gasconi Ortea, 1996
- Felimare gofasi Ortea & Valdés, 1996
- Felimare juliae DaCosta, Padula & Schrödl, 2010
- Felimare lajensis Troncoso, Garcia & Urgorri, 1998
- Felimare lalique Ortea & Caballer, 2013
- Felimare lapislazuli Bertsch & Ferreira, 1974
- Felimare lilyeveae Alejandrino & Valdés, 2006
- Felimare malacitana Luque, 1986
- Felimare marci Ev. Marcus, 1971
- Felimare muniainae Ortea & Valdés, 1996
- Felimare nyalya Ev. Marcus & Er. Marcus, 1967
- Felimare olgae Ortea & Bacallado, 2007
- Felimare orsinii Vérany, 1846
- Felimare picta Schultz in Philippi, 1836
- Felimare pinna Ortea, 1988
- Felimare ruthae Ev. Marcus & Hughes, 1974
- Felimare samueli Caballer & Ortea, 2012
- Felimare sechurana Hoover, Padula, Schrödl, Hooker & Valdés, 2017
- Felimare sycilla Bergh, 1890
- Felimare tema Edmunds, 1981
- Felimare tricolor Cantraine, 1835
- Felimare villafranca Risso, 1818
- Felimare xicoi Ortea & Valdés, 1996
- Felimare zebra Heilprin, 1889

Species brought into synonymy

- Felimare francoisae Bouchet, 1981: synonym of Neptunazurea francoisae
- Felimare garciagomezi Ortea & Á. Valdés, 1996: synonym of Neptunazurea garciagomezi
- Felimare ghiselini Bertsch, 1978: synonym of Felimare californiensis Bergh, 1879
- Felimare kempfi Ev. Marcus, 1971: synonym of Neptunazurea kempfi
- Felimare midatlantica Gosliner, 1990: synonym of Felimare tricolor Cantraine, 1835
- Felimare molloi Ortea & Á. Valdés, 1996: synonym of Neptunazurea molloi
- Felimare porterae T. D. A. Cockerell, 1901: synonym of Neptunazurea porterae
- Felimare sisalensis Ortigosa & Á. Valdés, 2012: synonym of Neptunazurea sisalensis
- Felimare verdensis Ortea, Valdés & García-Gómez, 1996: synonym of Felimare tema Edmunds, 1981

== Gallery ==
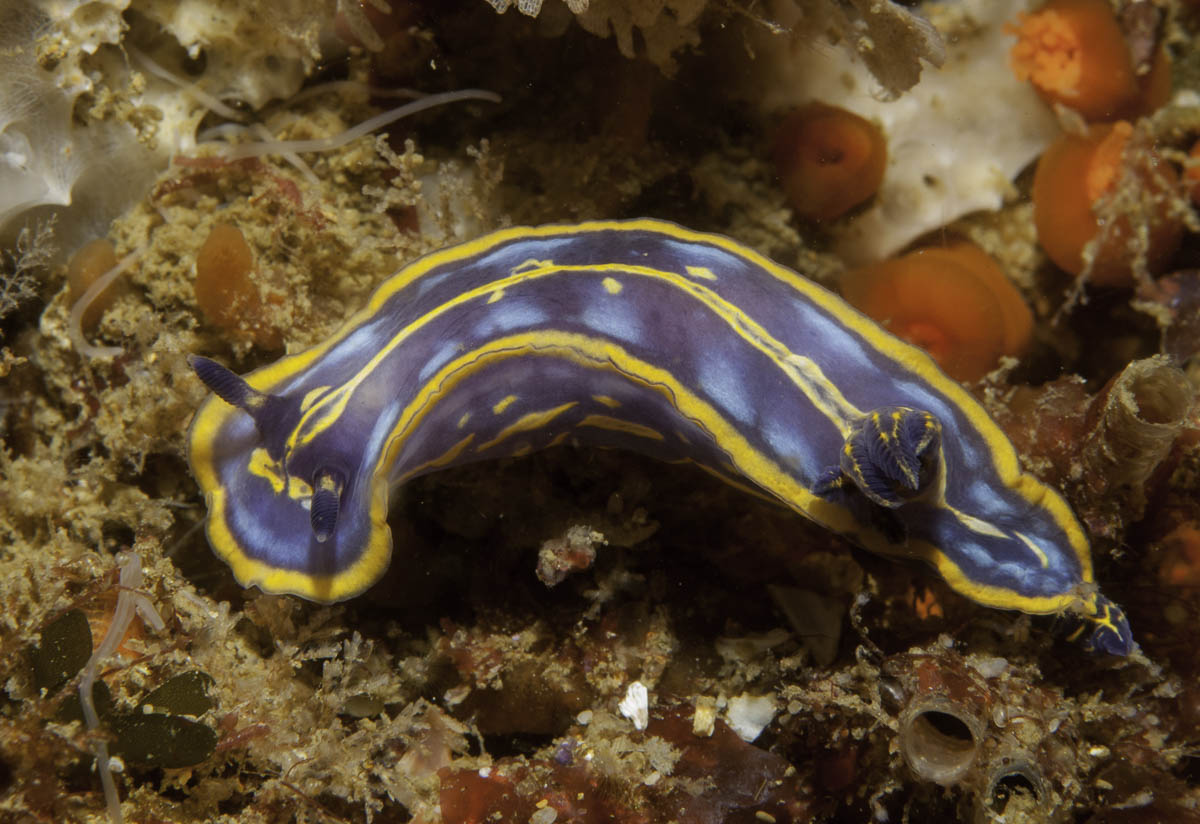
Felimare bilineata

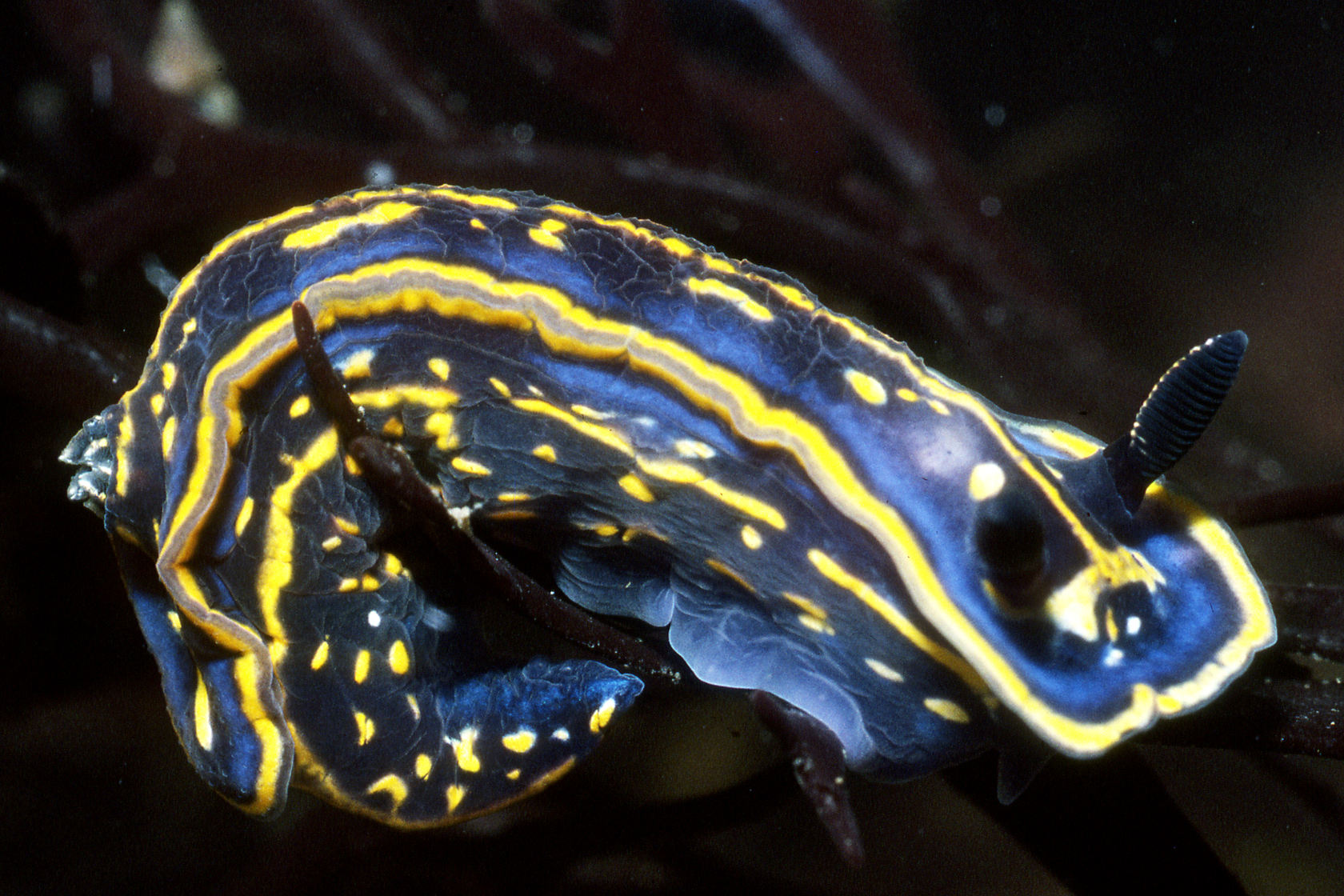
Felimare cantabrica

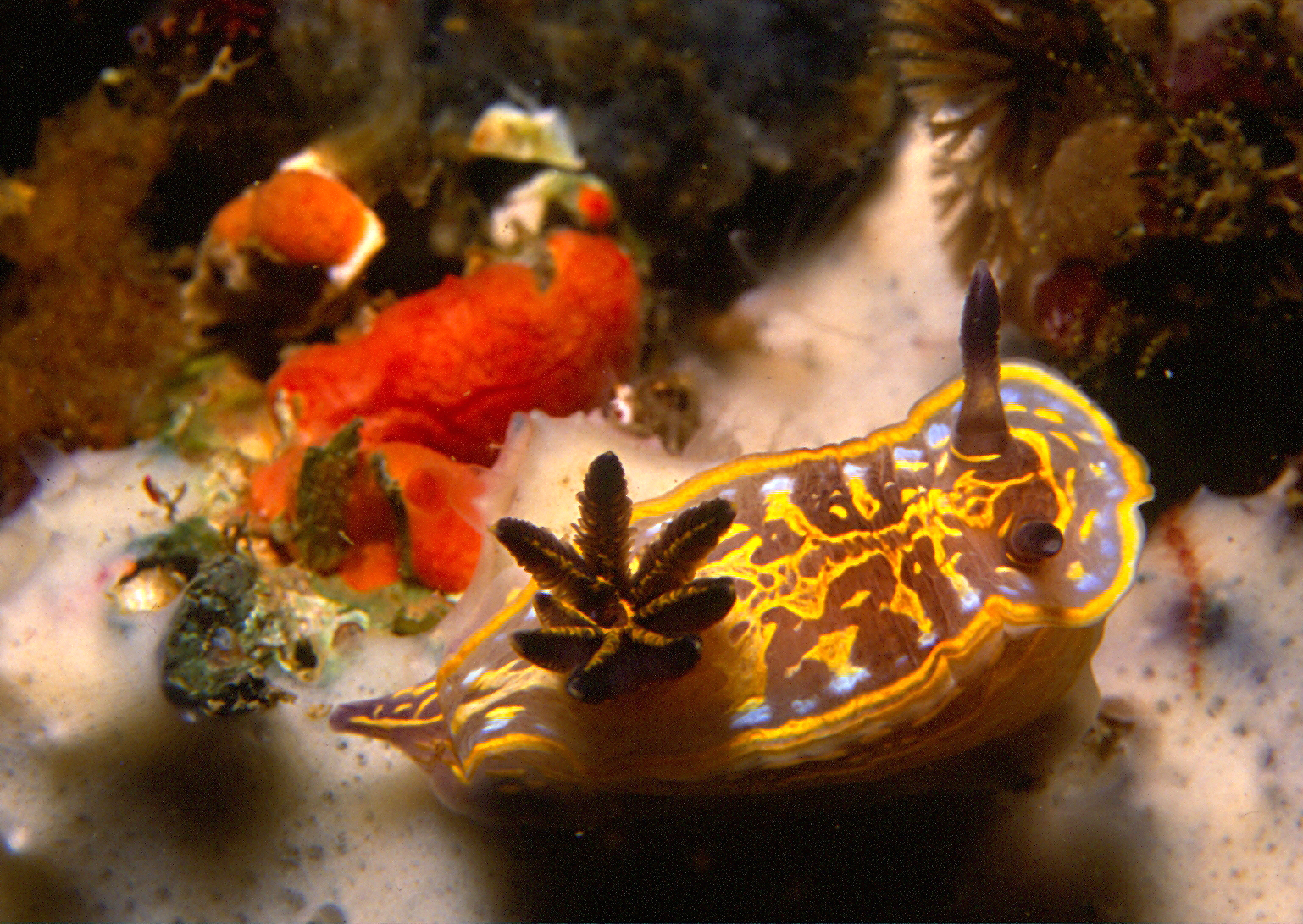
Felimare fontandraui

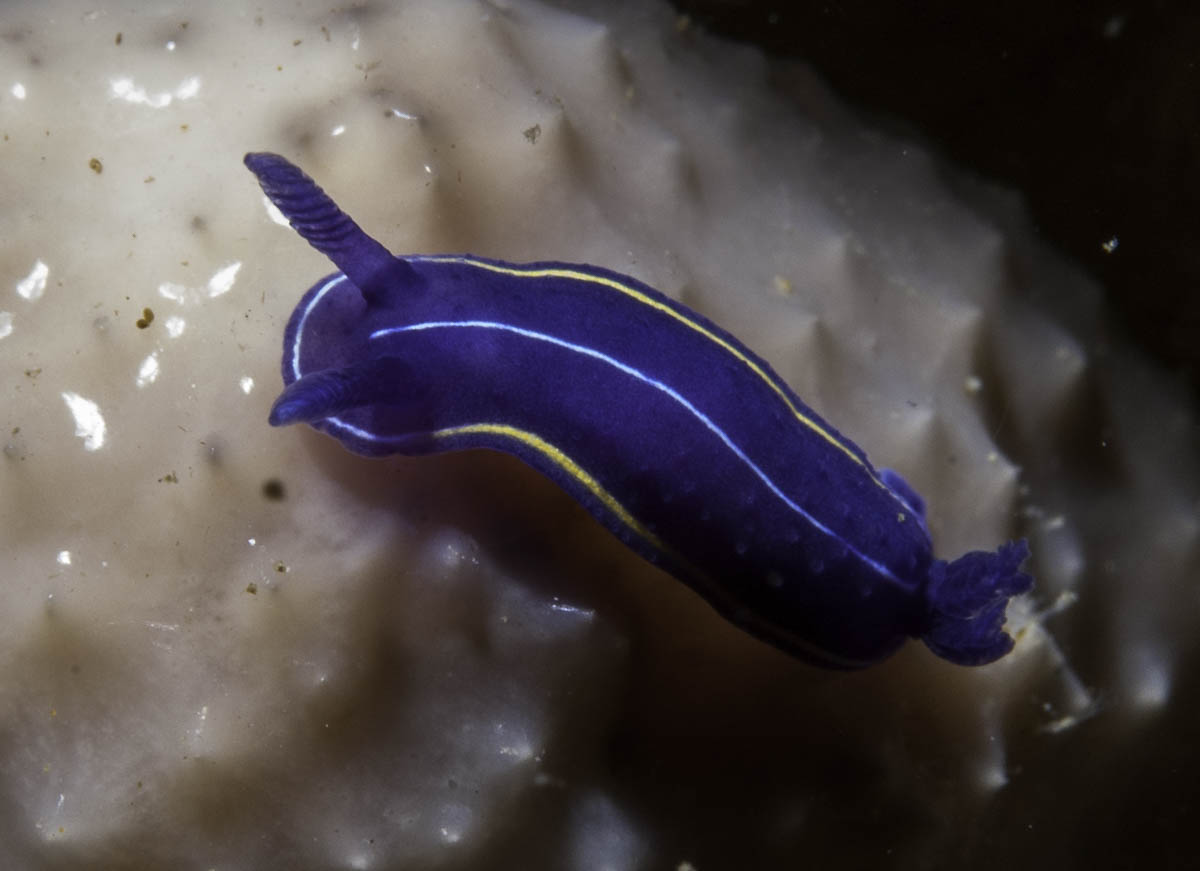
Felimare orsinii

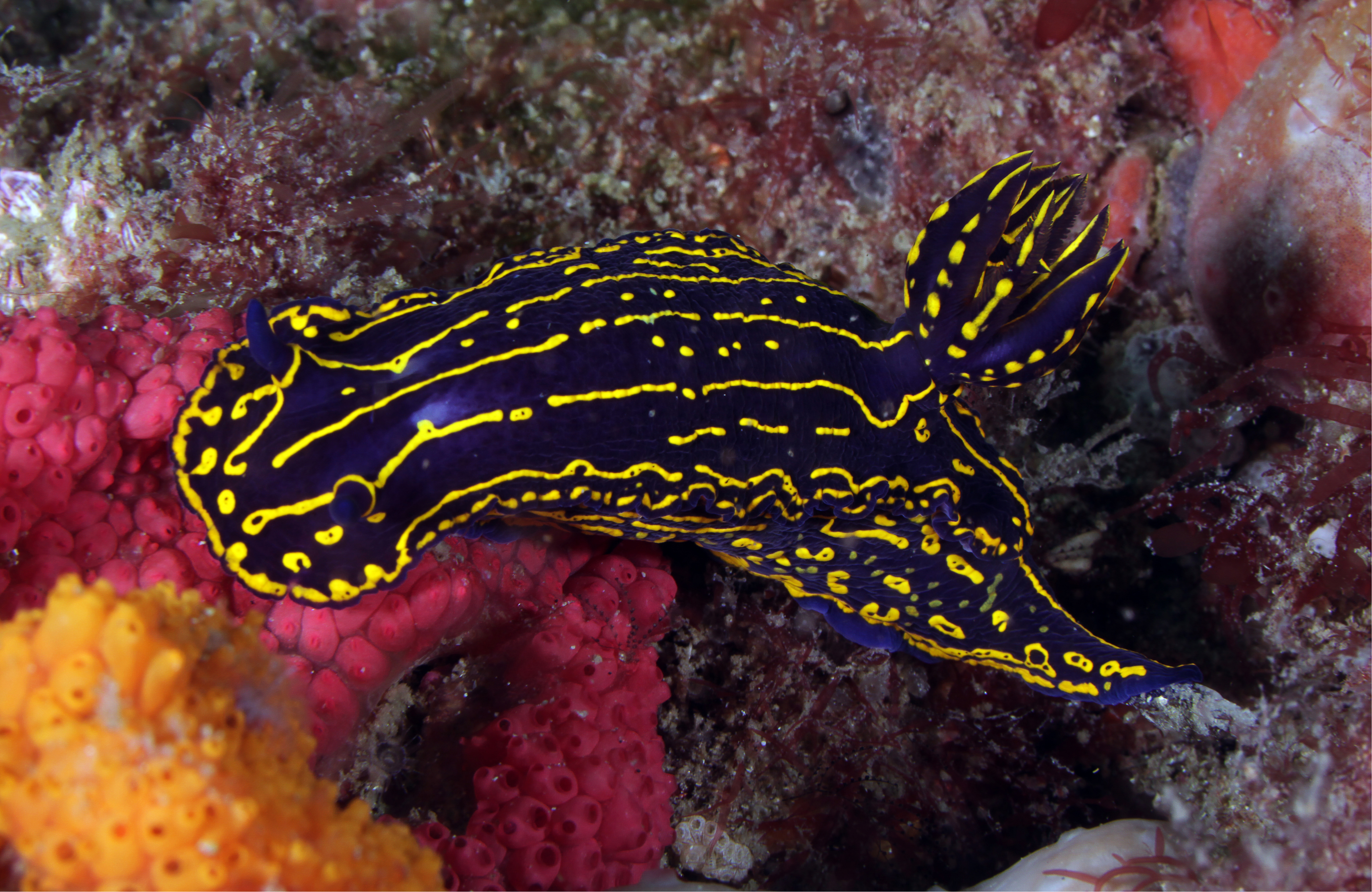
Felimare picta

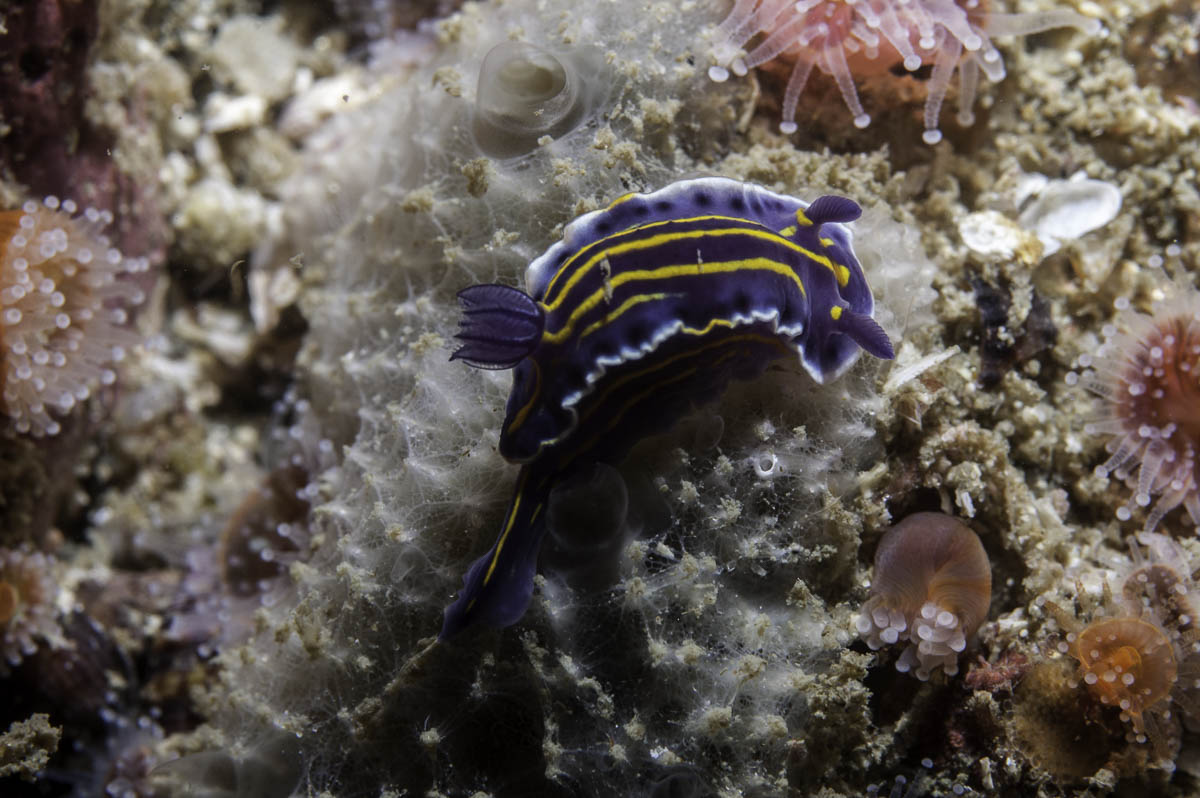
Felimare lajensis

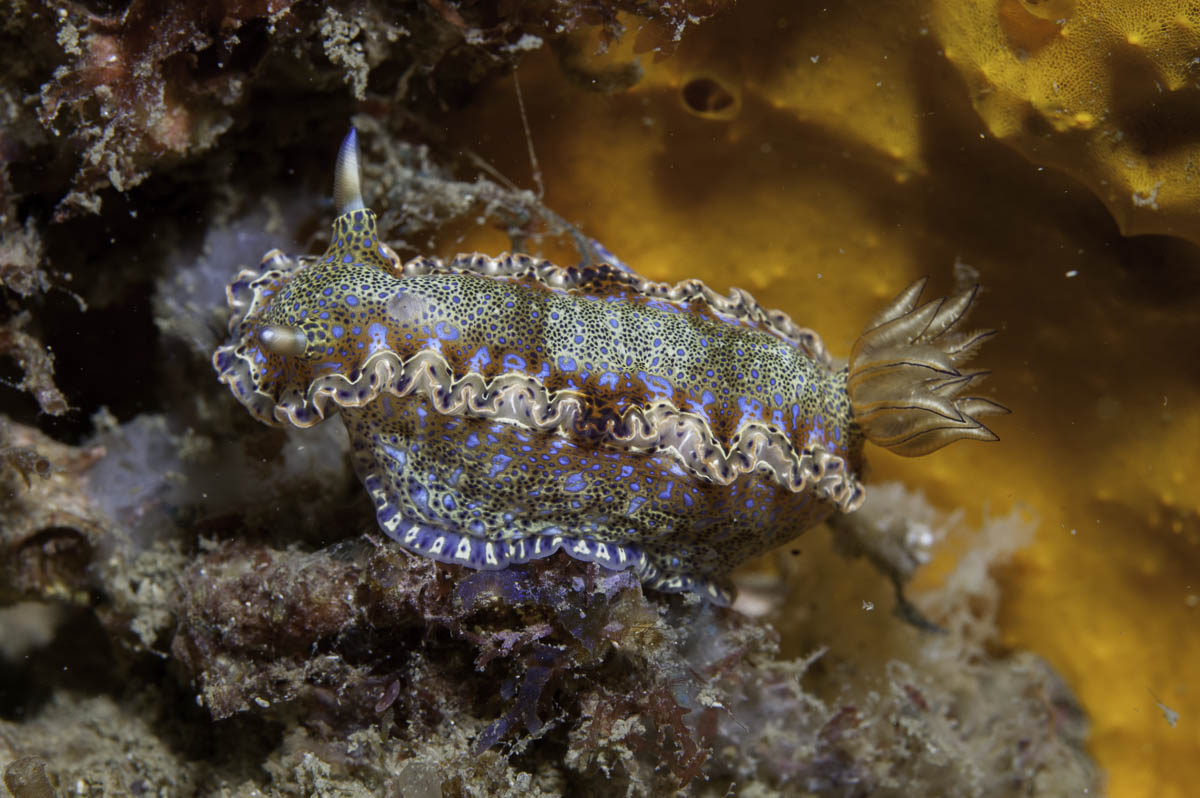
Felimare marci

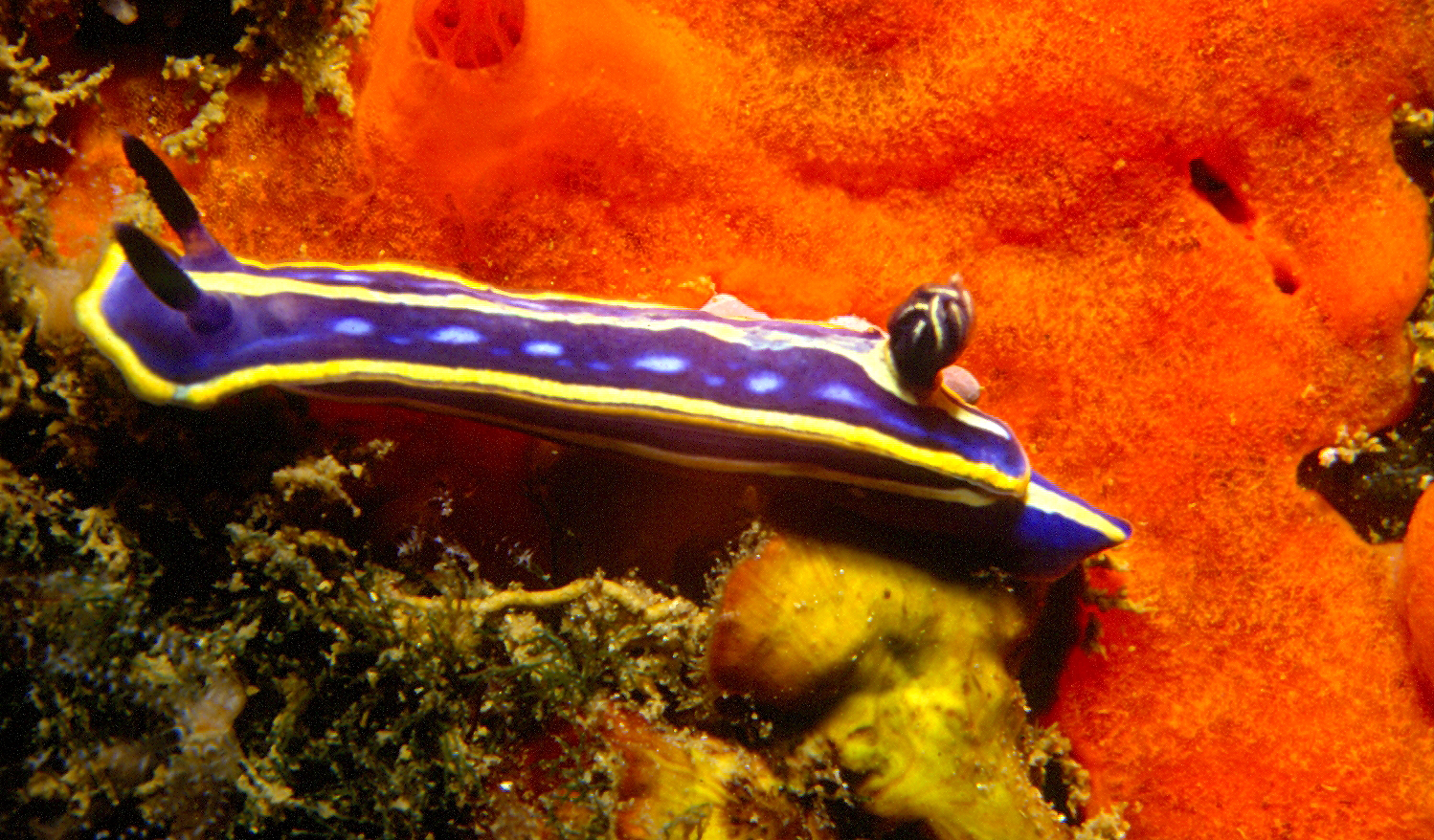
Felimare tricolor

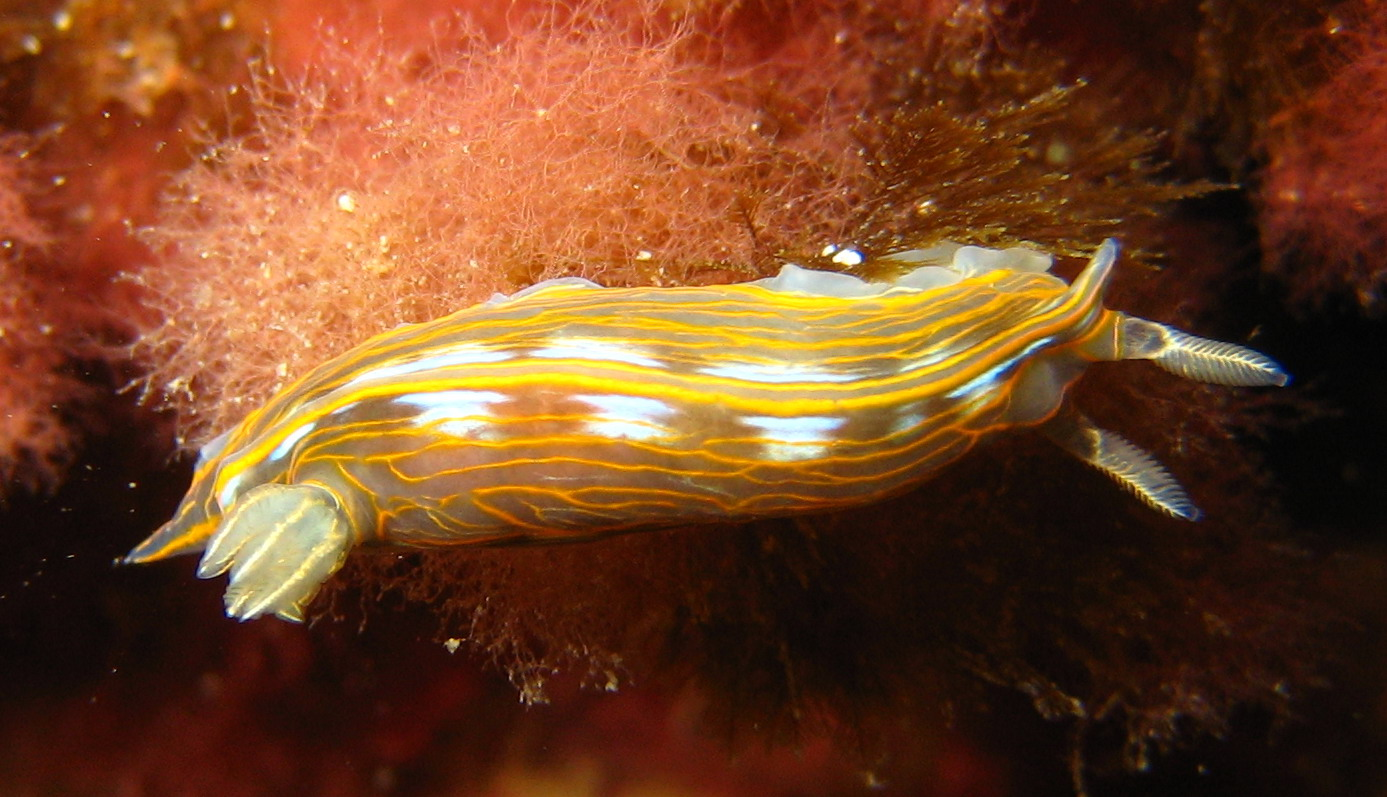
Felimare villafranca

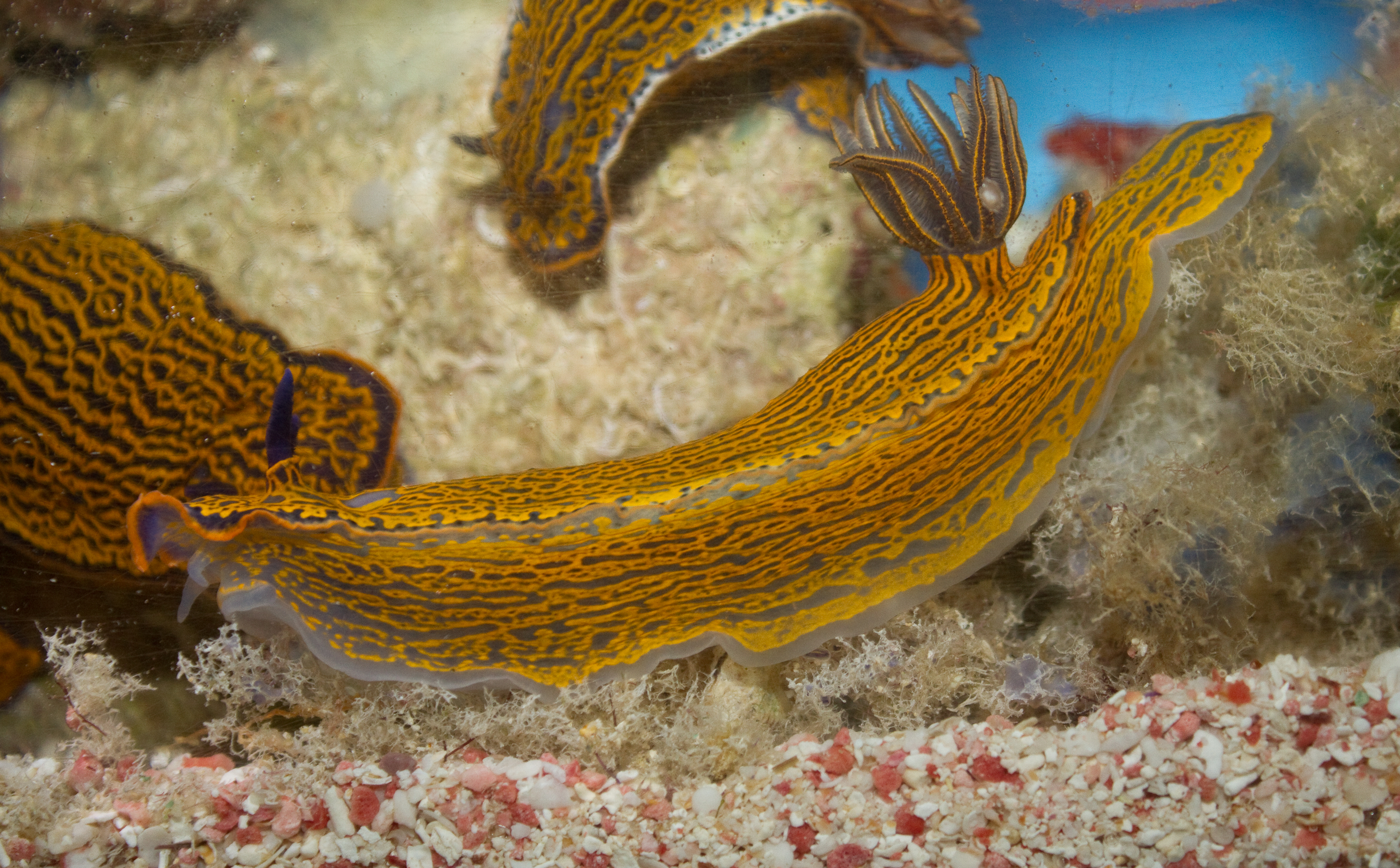
Felimare zebra
