= Felimare olgae =

Scientific classification
- Kingdom: Animalia
- Phylum: Mollusca
- Class: Gastropoda
- Order: Nudibranchia
- Family: Chromodorididae
- Genus: Felimare
- Species: F. olgae

Binomial name
- Felimare olgae (Ortea & Bacallado, 2007)

Synonyms
- Hypselodoris olgae Ortea & Bacallado, 2007 (original combination)

Species of gastropod

Felimare olgae is a species of very colourful sea slug or dorid nudibranch, a marine gastropod mollusk in the family Chromodorididae.

== Distribution ==
This nudibranch is found in the Caribbean.

== Description ==
Felimare olgae has a golden-brown body covered in blue and black spots. The mantle is pale yellow. The gills are pale yellow outlined with dark-blue and the rhinophores are pale-yellow, tipped with dark blue. This species can reach a total length of at least 35 mm (1.4 in) and has been observed feeding on the blue sponge Dysidea etheria.
