= Felimare samueli =

Scientific classification
- Kingdom: Animalia
- Phylum: Mollusca
- Class: Gastropoda
- Order: Nudibranchia
- Family: Chromodorididae
- Genus: Felimare
- Species: F. samueli

Binomial name
- Felimare samueli (Caballer & Ortea, 2012)

Synonyms
- Hypselodoris samueli Caballer & Ortea, 2012

Species of gastropod

Felimare samueli is a species of sea slug or dorid nudibranch, a marine gastropod mollusc in the family Chromodorididae.

== Distribution ==
This species was described from a specimen measuring 85 mm (3.3 in) collected in 1.5 m (4 ft 11 in) depth at the Mouth of El Ocho lagoon, Morrocoy, State Falcón, west coast of Venezuela, 10°52′05″N 68°13′27″W and two paratypes measuring 50 mm (2.0 in) and 10 mm (0.39 in) from the same locality.
