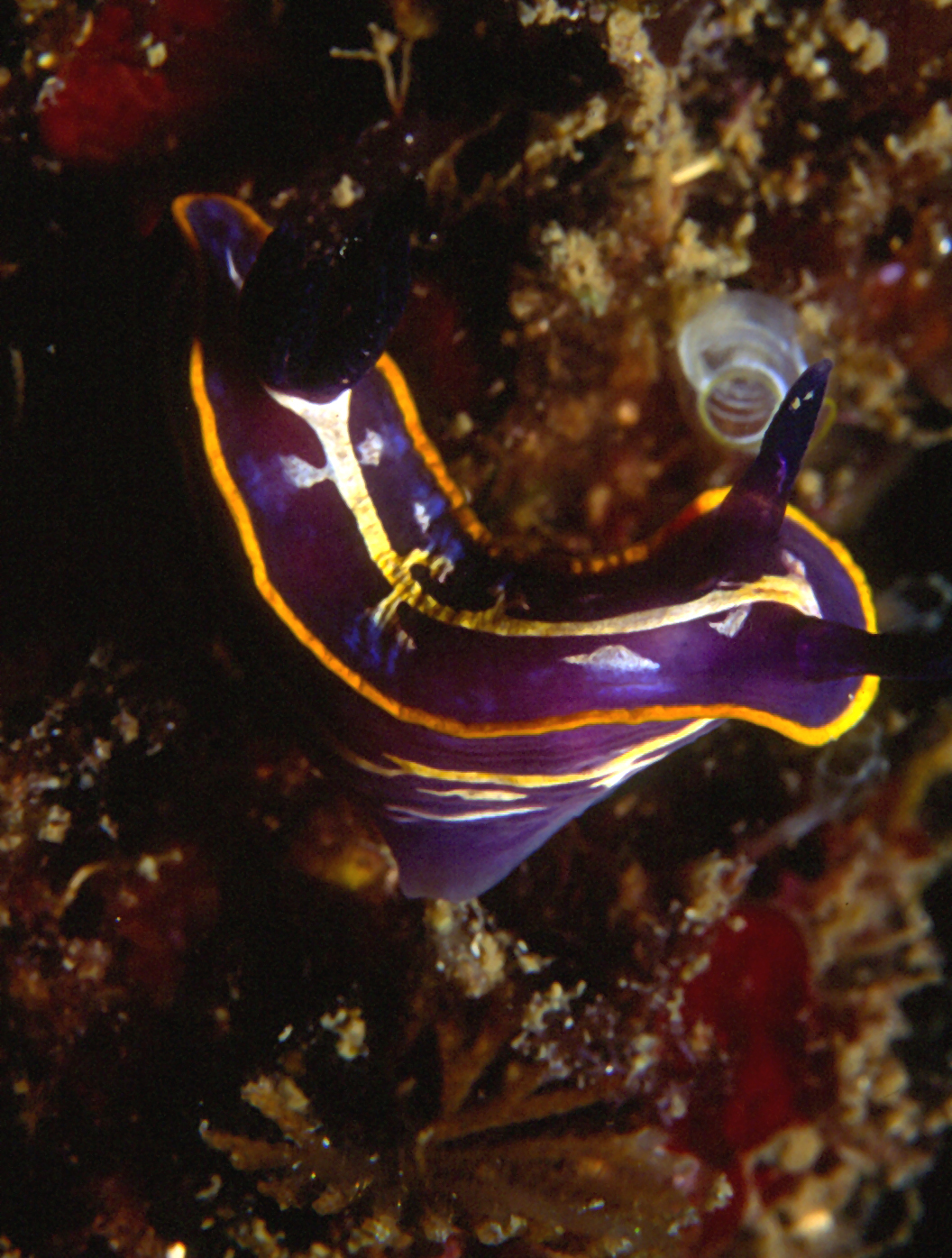

Scientific classification
- Kingdom: Animalia
- Phylum: Mollusca
- Class: Gastropoda
- Order: Nudibranchia
- Family: Chromodorididae
- Genus: Felimare
- Species: F. fontandraui

Binomial name
- Felimare fontandraui (Pruvot-Fol, 1951)

Synonyms
- Glossodoris fontandraui Pruvot-Fol, 1951 (original combination); Hypselodoris fontandraui (Pruvot-Fol, 1951)

= Felimare fontandraui =

Species of gastropod

Felimare fontandraui is a species of colourful dorid nudibranch, a type of sea slug, in the family Chromodorididae.

== Distribution ==
This nudibranch is known from the Eastern Atlantic Ocean and the Western Mediterranean.

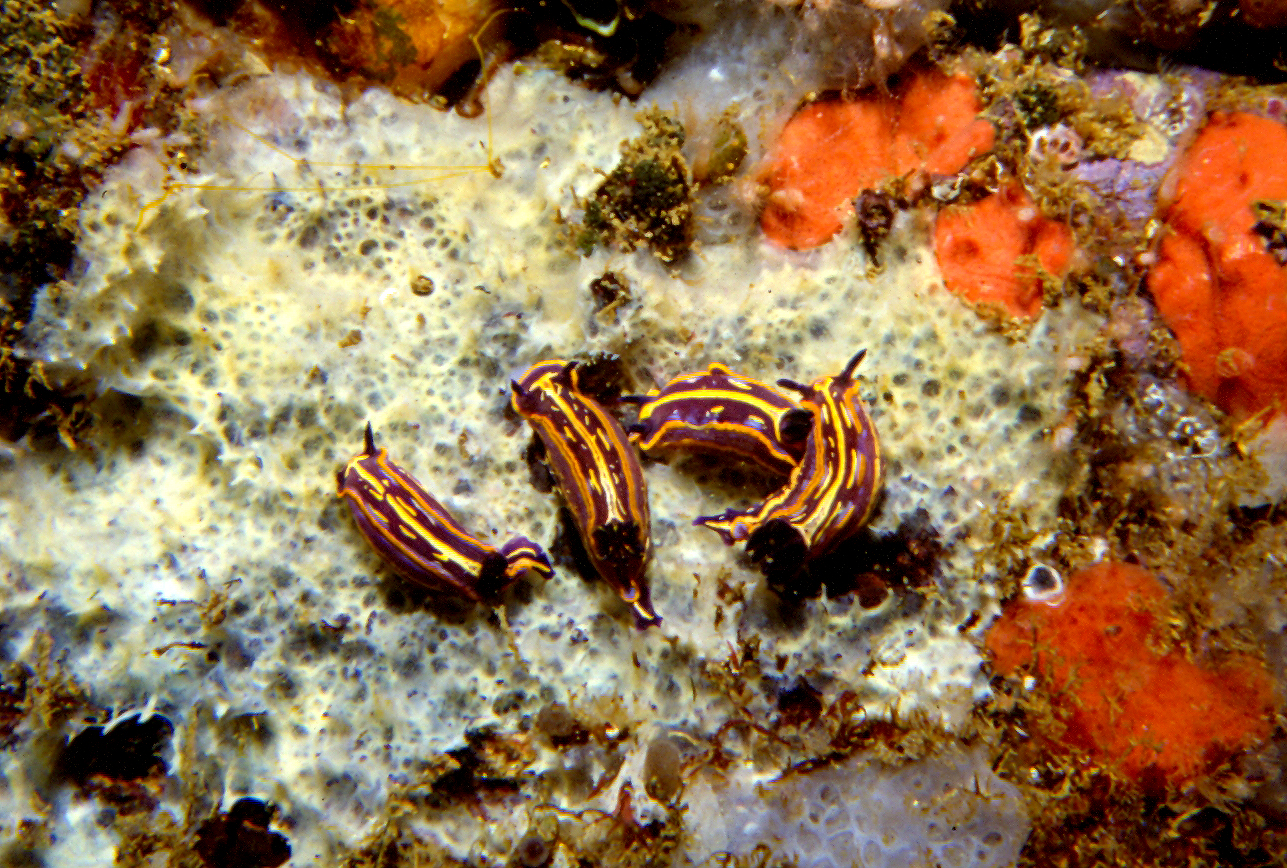
Felimare fontandraui feeding on a sponge of the genus Dysidea

== Description ==
Felimare fontandraui typically has a blue to purple body with yellow lines running down its sides and a single yellow-cream line on its upper dorsum. The upper dorsum is also often marked with light blue streaks near the mantle edge. Its mantle is edged in orange and it has black-purple gills and rhinophores. There is considerable colour variation within this species.

This species can reach a total length of at least 30 mm and has been observed feeding on yellow sponges from the genus Dysidea.
