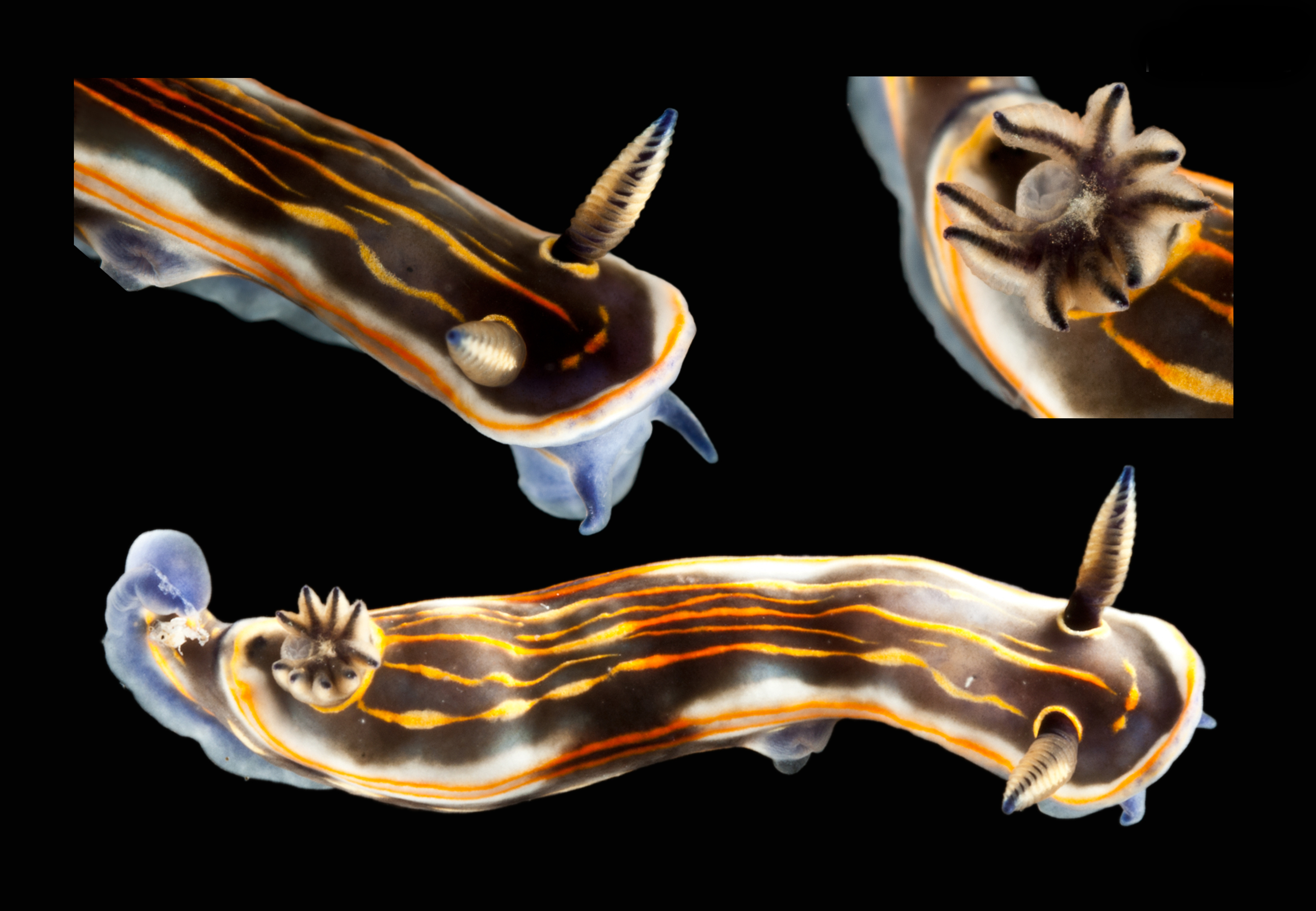
- Holotype of Hypselodoris lalique, Sec Ferry, Guadeloupe

Scientific classification
- Kingdom: Animalia
- Phylum: Mollusca
- Class: Gastropoda
- Order: Nudibranchia
- Superfamily: Chromodoridoidea
- Family: Chromodorididae
- Genus: Felimare
- Species: F. lalique

Binomial name
- Felimare lalique (Ortea & Caballer, 2013)

Synonyms
- Hypselodoris lalique Ortea & Caballer, 2013

= Felimare lalique =

Species of gastropod

Felimare lalique is a species of sea slug or dorid nudibranch, a marine gastropod mollusc in the family Chromodorididae.

== Description ==
The length of the shell attains 18 mm.

== Distribution ==
This species was described from a specimen measuring 18 mm (0.71 in) collected at 27 m (89 ft) depth at Sec Ferry, Guadeloupe, 16°17′N 61°48′W.
