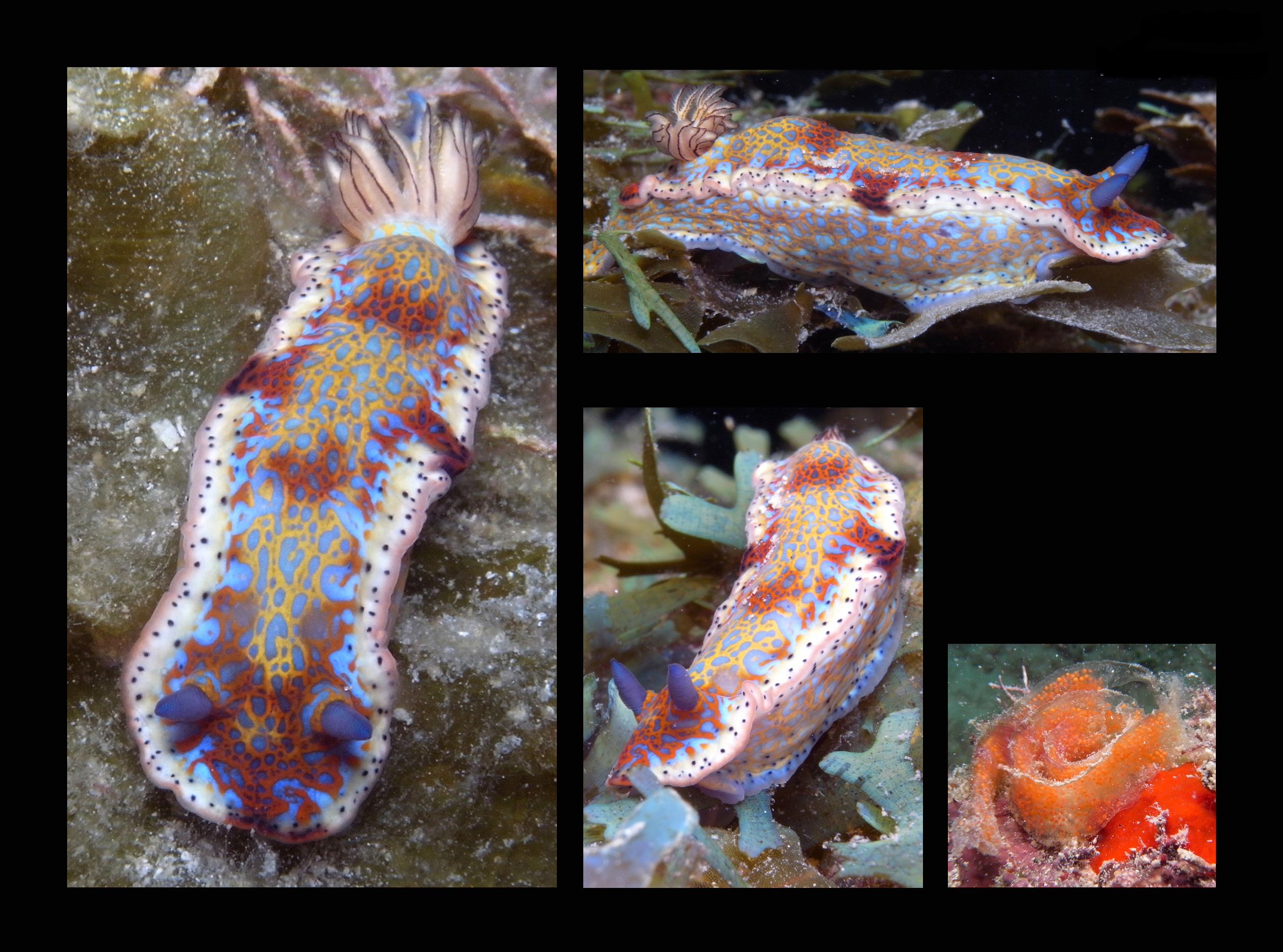
- Holotype of Hypselodoris alaini, Port-Louis, Guadeloupe.

Scientific classification
- Kingdom: Animalia
- Phylum: Mollusca
- Class: Gastropoda
- Order: Nudibranchia
- Family: Chromodorididae
- Genus: Felimare
- Species: F. alaini

Binomial name
- Felimare alaini (Ortea, Espinosa & Buske, 2013)

Synonyms
- Hypselodoris alaini Ortea, Espinosa & Buske, 2013

= Felimare alaini =

Species of gastropod

Felimare alaini is a species of sea slug or dorid nudibranch, a marine gastropod mollusc in the family Chromodorididae.

== Description ==
The length of the species attains 40 mm; It occurs at the depth of 10-25 m in reefs.

== Distribution ==
This species was described from two specimens collected at 10–13 m (33–43 ft) depth at Port Louis, Guadeloupe, 16°23.2′N 61°31.7′W and a paratype from Petit Havre, Guadeloupe. It was reported from Saint Martin as Hypselodoris cf. acriba and from Anguilla, British West Indies, as Hypselodoris acriba.

== Eytomology ==
The specific name was named in honour of Alain Goyeau who is an expert in underwater nature of Guadeloupe.
