= Felimare nyalya =

Scientific classification
- Kingdom: Animalia
- Phylum: Mollusca
- Class: Gastropoda
- Order: Nudibranchia
- Family: Chromodorididae
- Genus: Felimare
- Species: F. nyalya

Binomial name
- Felimare nyalya (Ev. Marcus & Er. Marcus, 1967)

Synonyms
- Chromodoris nyalya Ev. Marcus & Er. Marcus, 1967 (basionym); Risbecia nyalya (Ev. Marcus & Er. Marcus, 1967)

Species of sea slug

Felimare nyalya is a species of colourful sea slug or dorid nudibranch, a marine gastropod mollusc in the family Chromodorididae.

== Taxonomic history ==
This species was originally described as Chromodoris nyalya by Eveline and Ernst Marcus in 1967, based on specimens collected from the tropical western Atlantic. It was later transferred to the genus Risbecia by Ortea, Valdés and García-Gómez in 1996 as Risbecia nyalya, during a revision of Atlantic blue chromodorids. It was subsequently moved into the resurrected genus Felimare based on extensive molecular phylogeny of the chromodorid nudibranchs.

== Distribution ==
This species is found in the western Atlantic Ocean. Its known range includes the Caribbean Sea, the waters surrounding Cuba, and the Gulf of Mexico.

== Ecology ==
Like many other species within the family Chromodorididae, Felimare nyalya is a carnivorous marine gastropod that likely feeds on specific species of sponges.
