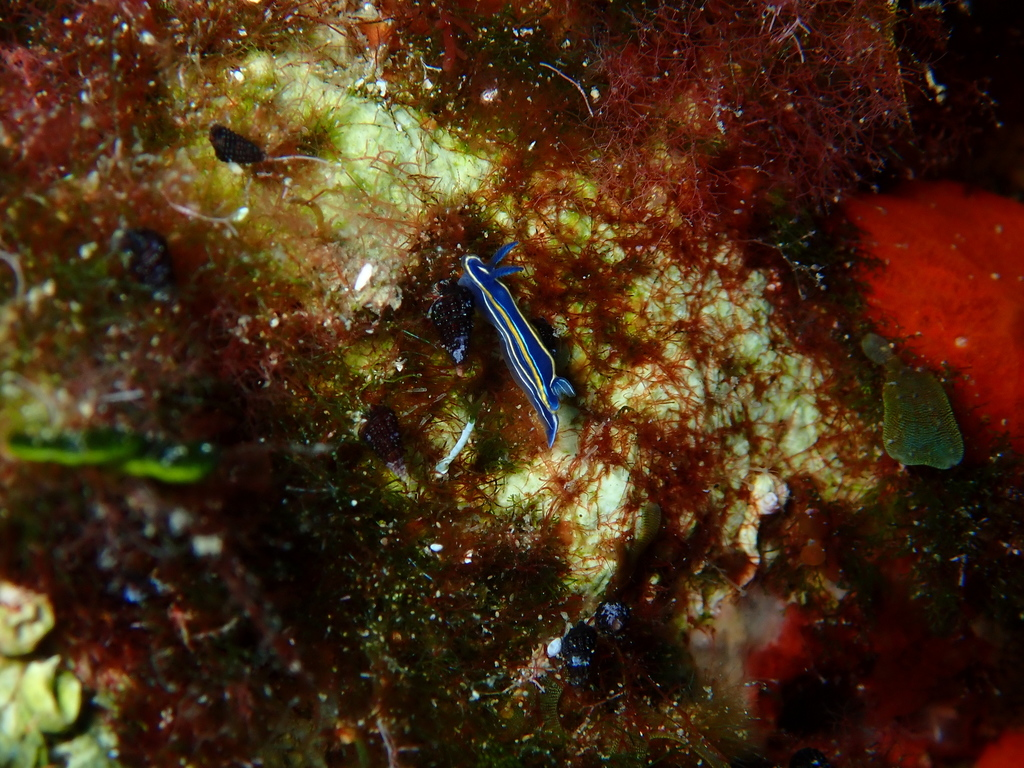

Scientific classification
- Kingdom: Animalia
- Phylum: Mollusca
- Class: Gastropoda
- Order: Nudibranchia
- Family: Chromodorididae
- Genus: Felimare
- Species: F. gasconi

Binomial name
- Felimare gasconi (Ortea, 1996)

Synonyms
- Hypselodoris gasconi Ortea, 1996 (basionym)

= Felimare gasconi =

Species of gastropod

Felimare gasconi is a species of colourful sea slug or dorid nudibranch, a marine gastropod mollusc in the family Chromodorididae.

== Distribution ==
This species was described from Calvi, Haute-Corse, France in the Mediterranean Sea.

== Description ==
Felimare gasconi has a dark blue body with a single white line running centrally along the dorsum. It has an orange and white edged mantle. The gills and rhinophores are dark blue, faintly outlined with white. This species can reach a total length of at least 15 mm.
