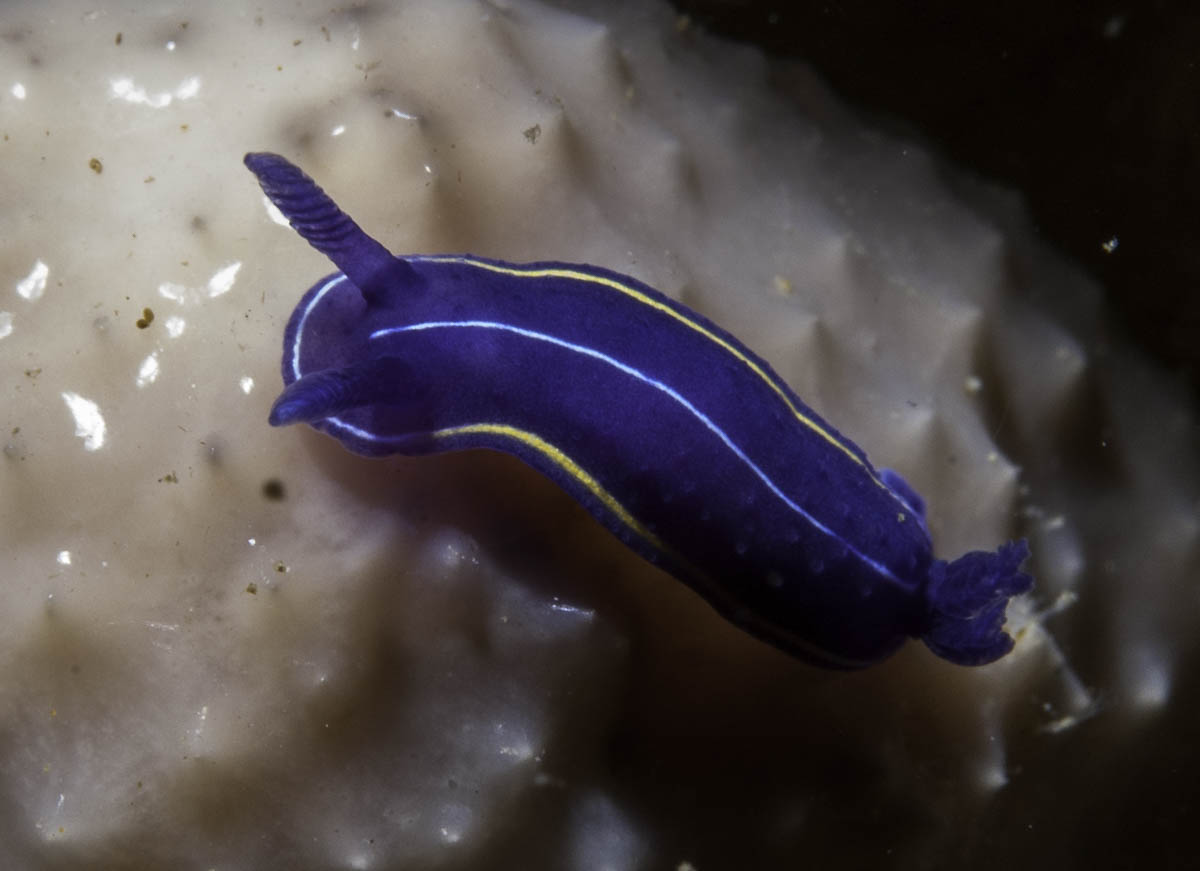
- East of Marseille, France

Scientific classification
- Kingdom: Animalia
- Phylum: Mollusca
- Class: Gastropoda
- Order: Nudibranchia
- Family: Chromodorididae
- Genus: Felimare
- Species: F. orsinii

Binomial name
- Felimare orsinii (Verany, 1846)

Synonyms
- Chromodoris orsinii (Vérany, 1846); Doris orsinii Vérany, 1846 (basionym); Glossodoris coelestis (Deshayes in Fredol, 1865); Glossodoris orsinii (Vérany, 1846); Goniodoris coelestis Deshayes in Fredol, 1865; Hypselodoris coelestis (Deshayes in Fredol, 1865); Hypselodoris orsinii (Vérany, 1846)

= Felimare orsinii =

Species of gastropod

Felimare orsinii is a species of colourful sea slug, a dorid nudibranch in the family Chromodorididae.

== Distribution ==
This nudibranch is found in the Western Mediterranean Sea. Animals from the Eastern Mediterranean apparently lack the yellow colour in the submarginal line, but are considered to be the same species.

== Description ==
Felimare orsinii is one of a group of Felimare species from the Mediterranean Sea which are all quite similar. This species can be distinguished from the others by the entirely blue gills and rhinophores and the small raised tubercles on the back. There is a single median white line which is slightly edged with blue and a line at the edge of the mantle which is white except at the sides where it grades into yellow. The body reaches a length of 20 mm. This species eats the sponge Scalarispongia scalaris. Previously known as Hypselodoris orsinii all Atlantic species of Hypselodoris were shown to belong to a separate clade and were transferred to the genus Felimare in 2012.

== Gallery ==
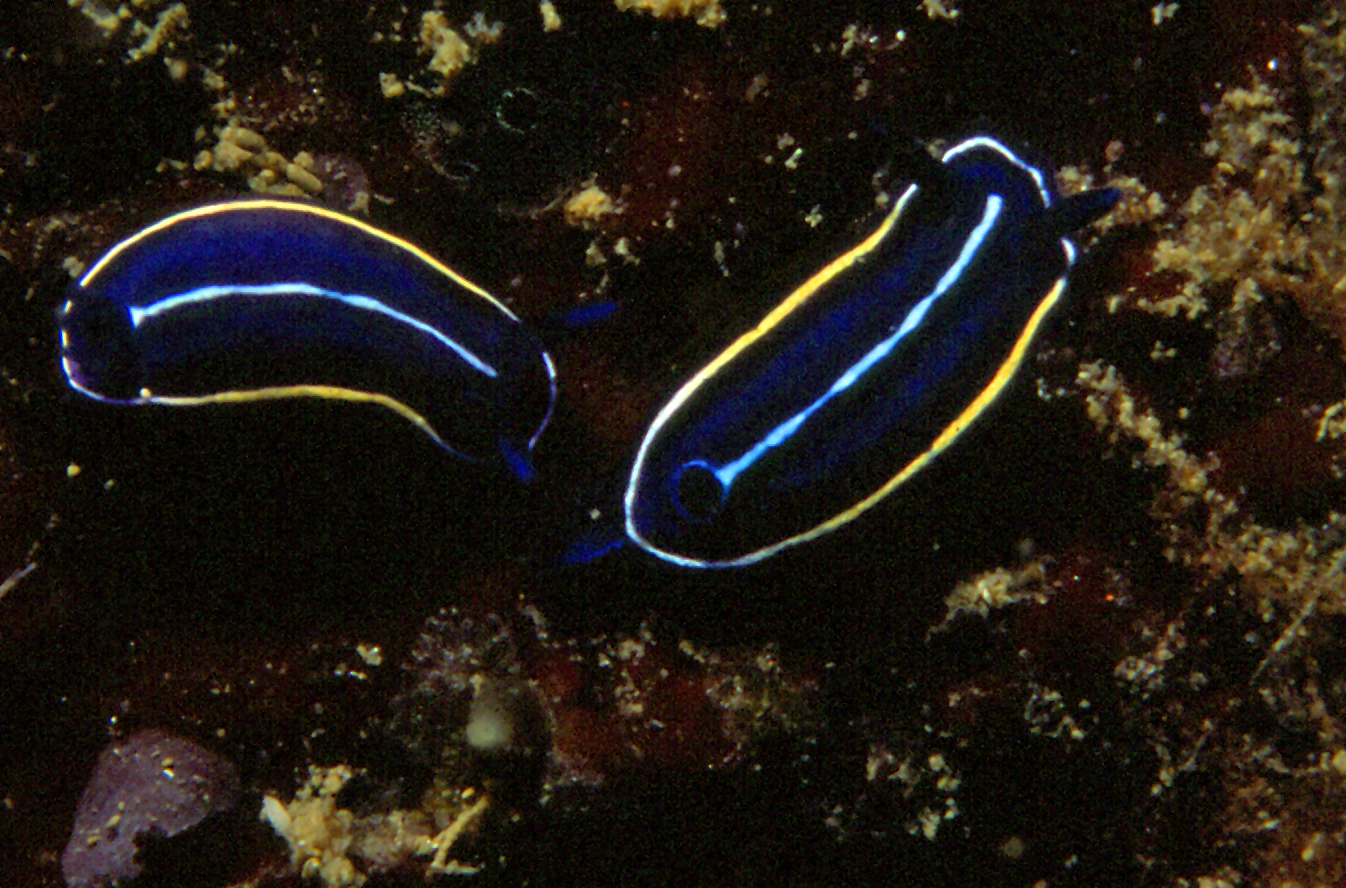

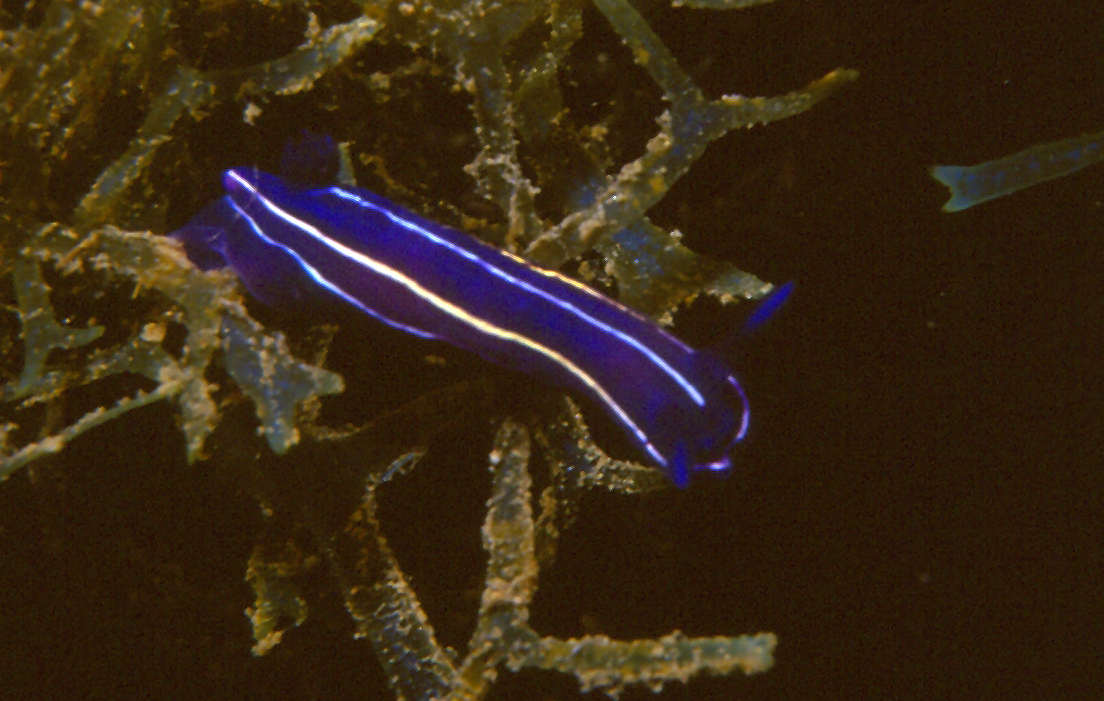

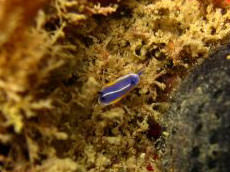
