= Felimare gofasi =

Scientific classification
- Kingdom: Animalia
- Phylum: Mollusca
- Class: Gastropoda
- Order: Nudibranchia
- Family: Chromodorididae
- Genus: Felimare
- Species: F. gofasi

Binomial name
- Felimare gofasi (Ortea, Valdés & García-Gómez, 1996)

Synonyms
- Hypselodoris gofasi Ortea & Valdés, 1996 (basionym)

Species of gastropod

Felimare gofasi is a species of colourful sea slug or dorid nudibranch, a marine gastropod mollusc in the family Chromodorididae.

== Distribution ==
This species was described from Santa Maria, Luanda, Angola in the Atlantic Ocean.
