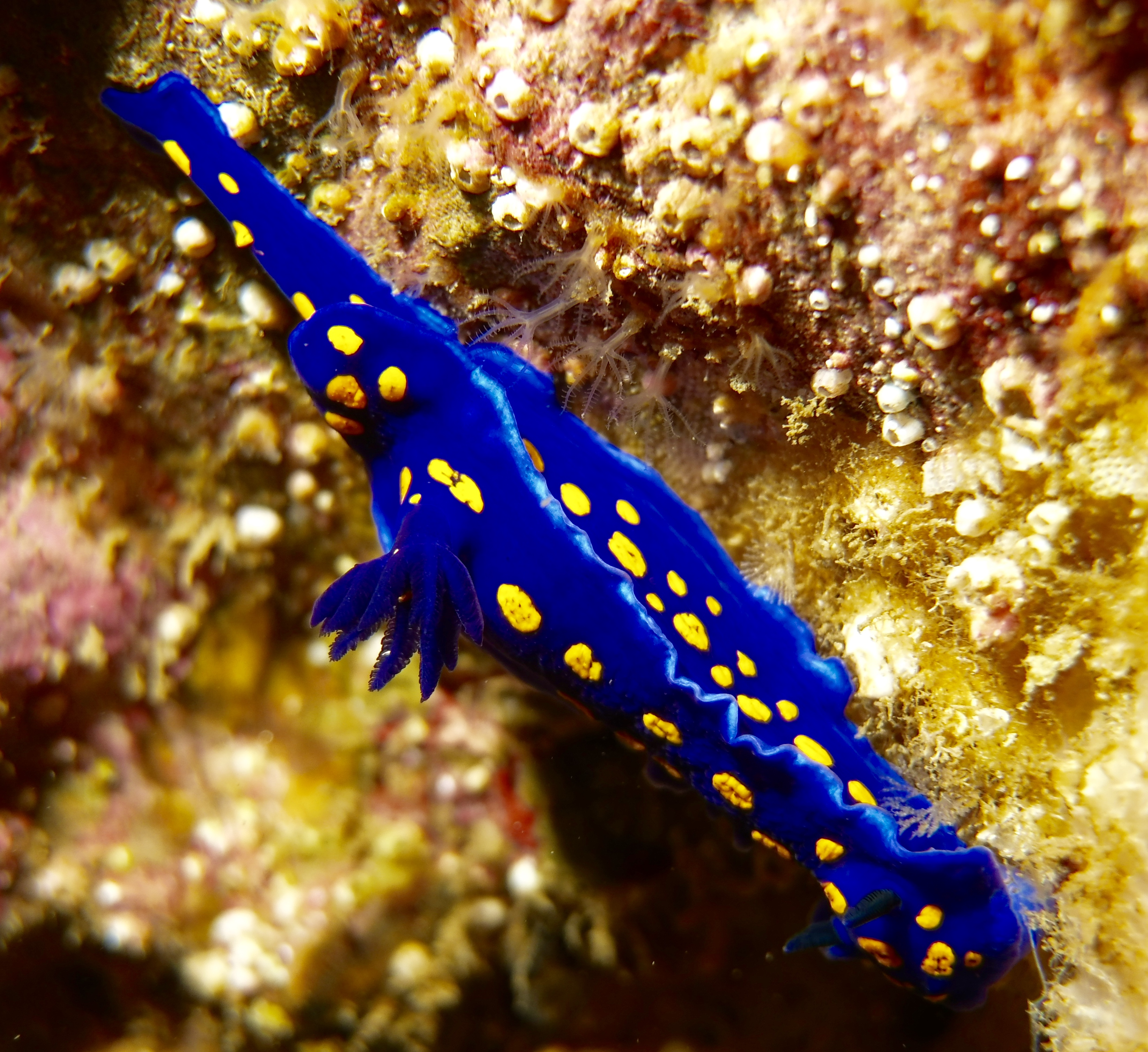
- Santa Cruz Island, South California

Scientific classification
- Kingdom: Animalia
- Phylum: Mollusca
- Class: Gastropoda
- Order: Nudibranchia
- Family: Chromodorididae
- Genus: Felimare
- Species: F. californiensis

Binomial name
- Felimare californiensis (Bergh, 1879)

Synonyms
- Chromodoris californiensis Bergh, 1879 (basionym); Chromodoris calensis Bergh, 1879; Chromodoris glauca Bergh, 1879; Chromodoris universitatis Cockerell, 1901; Hypselodoris californiensis (Bergh, 1879); Hypselodoris ghiselini Bertsch, 1978

= Felimare californiensis =

California blue dorid

Species of gastropod

Felimare californiensis, common name the California blue dorid, is a species of colourful sea slug or dorid nudibranch, a marine gastropod mollusk in the family Chromodorididae that eats dysideid sponges.

== Distribution ==
This nudibranch is found in the Eastern Pacific Ocean along the Californian coast from Monterey Bay through Baja California. It became regionally extinct in the northern part of its range, disappearing completely from California by 1984. It reappeared beginning in 2003 and is now found in a few isolated places in California. It has been shown to be synonymous with Felimare ghiselini.

== Description ==
Felimare californiensis has a blue mantle and foot with moderately large yellow-orange spots. The body grows to a length of 90 mm.
