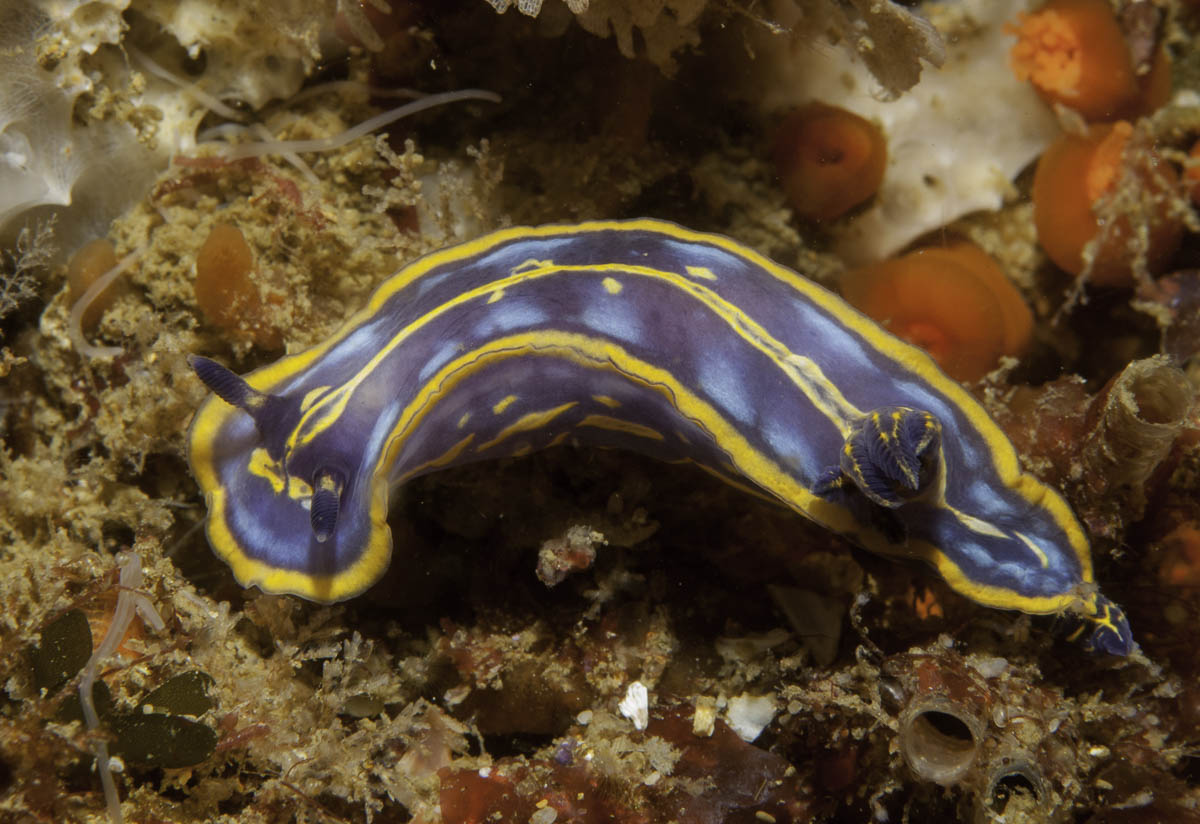
- In Sagres, Portugal

Scientific classification
- Kingdom: Animalia
- Phylum: Mollusca
- Class: Gastropoda
- Order: Nudibranchia
- Family: Chromodorididae
- Genus: Felimare
- Species: F. bilineata

Binomial name
- Felimare bilineata (Pruvot-Fol, 1953)

Synonyms
- Glossodoris bilineata Pruvot-Fol, 1953 (basionym); Hypselodoris bilineata (Pruvot-Fol, 1953)

= Felimare bilineata =

Species of gastropod

Felimare bilineata is a species of colourful sea slug or dorid nudibranch, a marine gastropod mollusc in the family Chromodorididae.

Subspecies

- Felimare bilineata bilineata (Pruvot-Fol, 1953)
- Felimare bilineata senegalensis (Ortea, Valdés & García-Gómez, 1996)
- Felimare bilineata viridis (Ortea, Valdés & García-Gómez, 1996)

== Distribution ==
This nudibranch is known from the Eastern Atlantic Ocean (from Portugal to Ghana) and the Western Mediterranean.

== Description ==
Felimare bilineata has a blue body with an orange-lined mantle. The upper dorsum and body have one or two orange longitudinal lines running down the length of the animal. The gills and rhinophores are black, edged with orange. There are two lines at the base of the outer side of each gill, converging at the tip. This species can reach a total length of at least 40 mm (1.6 in).

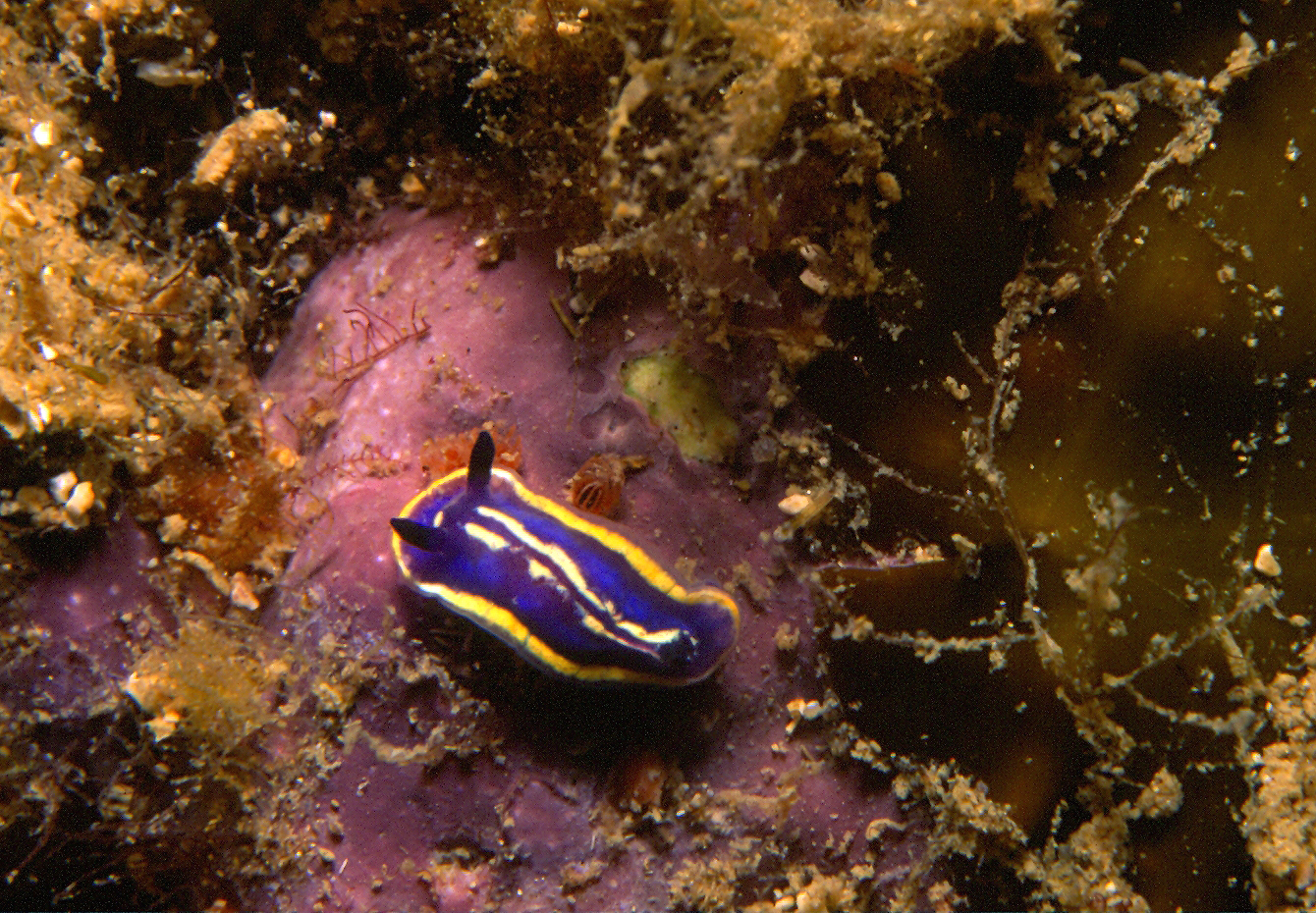
Felimare bilineata
