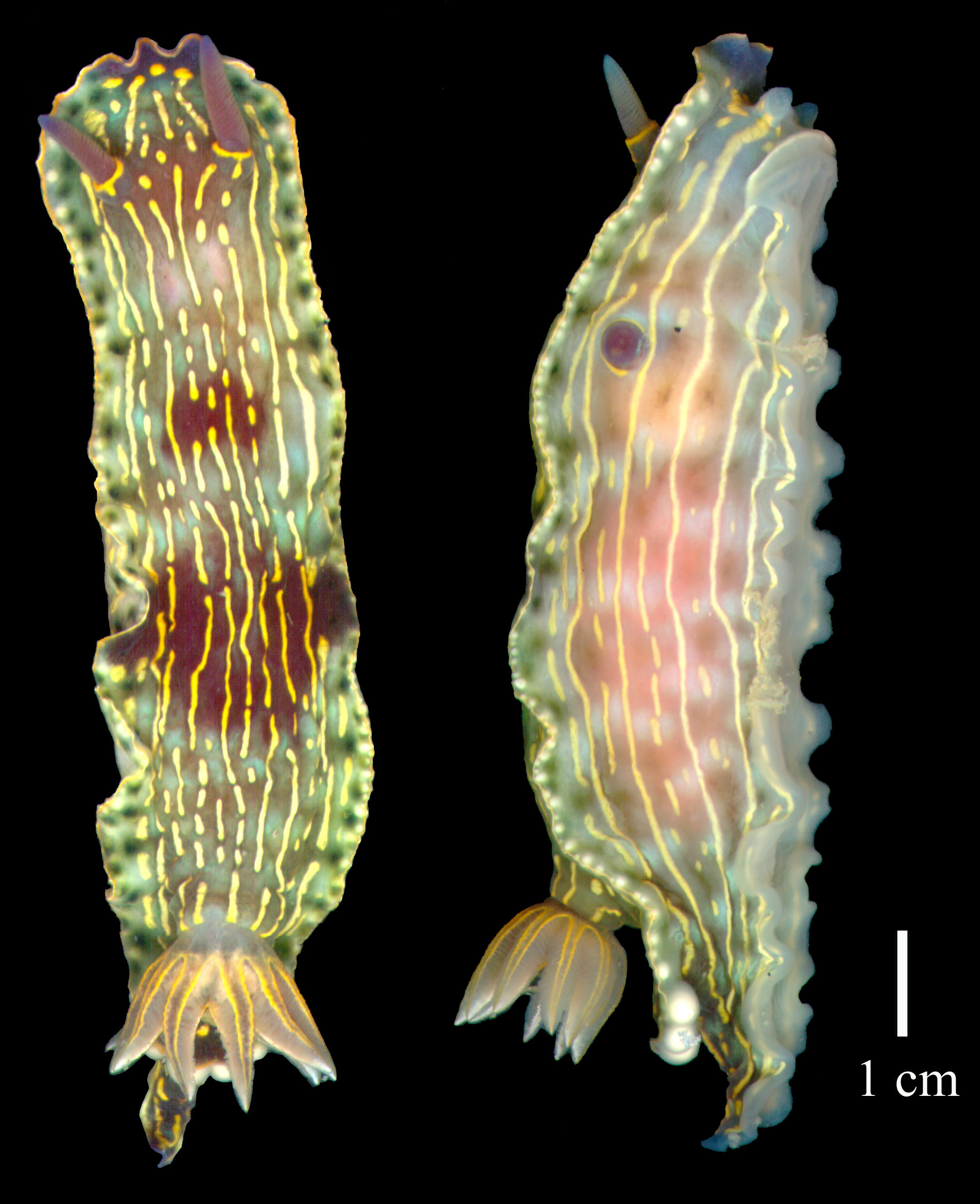
- Felimare bayeri

Scientific classification
- Kingdom: Animalia
- Phylum: Mollusca
- Class: Gastropoda
- Order: Nudibranchia
- Family: Chromodorididae
- Genus: Felimare
- Species: F. bayeri

Binomial name
- Felimare bayeri Ev. Marcus & Er. Marcus, 1967

Synonyms
- Hypselodoris bayeri (Ev. Marcus & Er. Marcus, 1967)

= Felimare bayeri =

Species of gastropod

Felimare bayeri is a species of colorful sea slug or dorid nudibranch, a marine gastropod mollusk in the family Chromodorididae. It was described by Eveline and Ernst Marcus in 1967.

== Taxonomic history ==
Originally described as the only member of the new genus Felimare, it was subsequently transferred to Hypselodoris and Felimare was considered to be a synonym. However, in 2012 a thorough re-evaluation of the genera in the family Chromodorididae based on molecular data, DNA sequences, revealed several distinct clades and Felimare was resurrected for one of these. Felimare is currently considered to be the genus to which all Atlantic Ocean Hypselodoris species belong including all the blue and yellow-striped species from the Caribbean and the Mediterranean Sea.

== Distribution ==
This nudibranch is found in the Caribbean Sea (Florida, Belize, Mexico, Panama and Cuba) and the Gulf of Mexico.

== Description ==
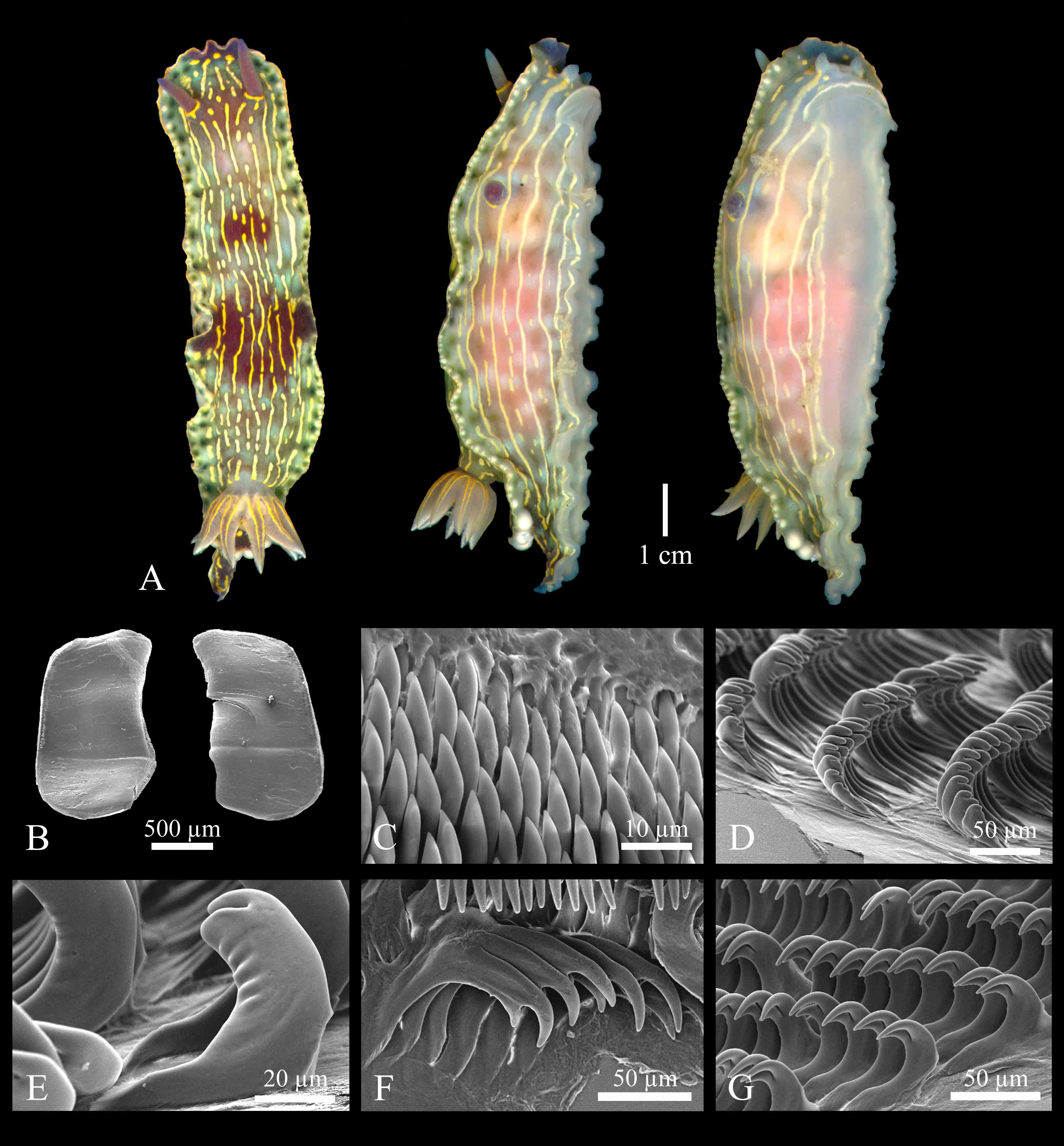
Radula of Felimare bayeri

Dark blue in color with a series of yellow longitudinal lines, it exhibits purple-blue rhinophores and opaque white branchial leaves marked by dark rachises. The foot's posterior end is blue with black spots and yellow lines. The maximum recorded length is 60 mm. The original description of the colour pattern reads "The color alive (based on a photograph) is: notum blue with 6-10 longitudinal anastomosing orange yellow lines edged with black, the more lateral ones often interrupted. The margin of the notum is white, indistinctly set off from the blue ground color, containing black spots of different size, and bordered by a yellow line externally. There is a yellow circle around the blue rhinophores. The gills are colorless with a black line alone the afferent vessel and a yellow with black one along the efferent vessel. The tail is white with orange yellow lines and black spots, edged with blue. The sides of the foot bear yellow stripes."

== Ecology ==
This species feeds on a blue species of the sponge Dysidea. It has been found at depths from 3 m to at least 18 m and possibly 70 m.
