= Felimare malacitana =

Scientific classification
- Kingdom: Animalia
- Phylum: Mollusca
- Class: Gastropoda
- Order: Nudibranchia
- Family: Chromodorididae
- Genus: Felimare
- Species: F. malacitana

Binomial name
- Felimare malacitana Luque, 1986

Synonyms
- Hypselodoris malacitana' Luque, 1986 (original combination)

Species of gastropod

Felimare malacitana is a species of colourful sea slug or dorid nudibranch, a marine gastropod mollusk in the family Chromodorididae.

== Distribution ==
This nudibranch is known only from the Mediterranean near Spain.

== Description ==
Felimare malacitana has a dark blue-black body and is covered in yellow specks. The mantle edge has bands of blue-yellow-black-yellow-blues lines. The gills and rhinophores are opaque light-blue lined with fine yellow.

This species can reach a total length of at least 20 millimetres (0.79 in).
