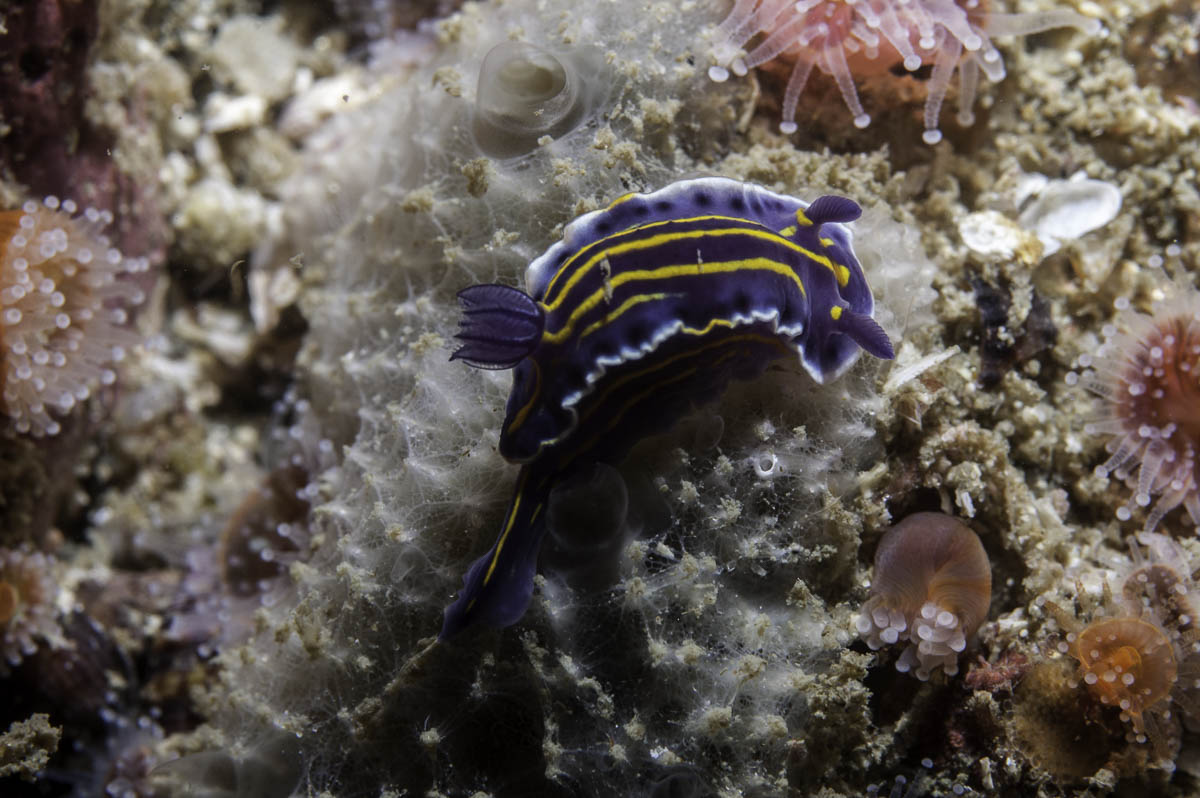
- The nudibranch Felimare lajensis, feeding on a sponge, Cabo Frio, Brazil.

Scientific classification
- Kingdom: Animalia
- Phylum: Mollusca
- Class: Gastropoda
- Order: Nudibranchia
- Family: Chromodorididae
- Genus: Felimare
- Species: F. lajensis

Binomial name
- Felimare lajensis (Troncoso, Garcia & Urgorri, 1998)

Synonyms
- Hypselodoris lajensis Troncoso, Garcia & Urgorri, 1998; Hypselodoris picta lajensis Troncoso, Garcia & Urgorri, 1998

= Felimare lajensis =

Species of gastropod

Felimare lajensis is a species of sea slug or dorid nudibranch, a marine gastropod mollusc in the family Chromodorididae.

== Distribution ==
This nudibranch is found in Brazil.

== Description ==
Felimare lajensis is dark blue in colour with a series of yellow longitudinal lines. The edge of the mantle is white and there is a series of darker blue spots on a blue background between the border and the first of the yellow lines. The rhinophores are entirely blue and the gills are also blue with very dark blue rachises. The maximum recorded body length is 30 mm.

== Habitat ==
Minimum recorded depth is 7.3 m. Maximum recorded depth is 25 m.

== Feeding habits ==
This species feeds on a blue species of sponge, Dysidea etheria.
