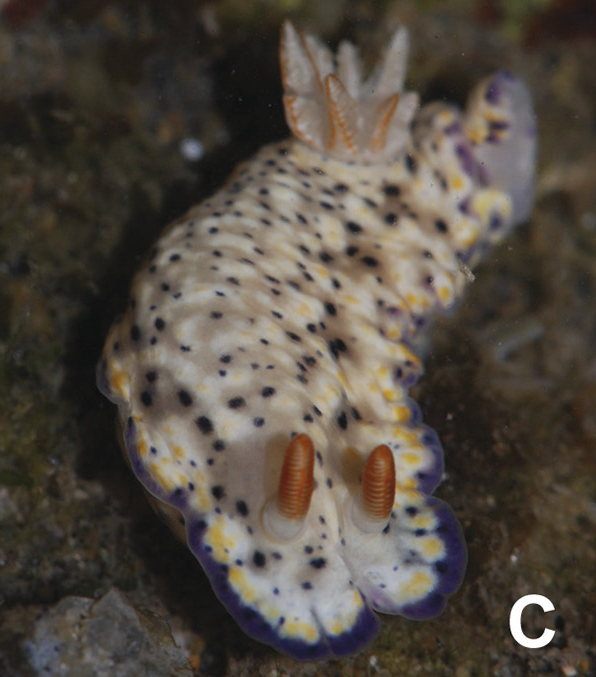

Scientific classification
- Kingdom: Animalia
- Phylum: Mollusca
- Class: Gastropoda
- Order: Nudibranchia
- Family: Chromodorididae
- Genus: Hypselodoris
- Species: H. rudmani

Binomial name
- Hypselodoris rudmani Gosliner & Johnson, 1999

= Hypselodoris rudmani =

Species of gastropod

Hypselodoris rudmani is a species of sea slug or dorid nudibranch, a marine gastropod mollusk in the family Chromodorididae. This species is named after the well known malacologist William B. Rudman.

== Distribution ==
The holotype of this nudibranch was collected at 11 m (36 ft) depth from Philip’s Reef (33°58.326′S 25°40.748′E), Port Elizabeth, Algoa Bay, Cape Province, South Africa. Two additional specimens in the original description were from warmer water sites further north at Park Rynie (30.333811°S 30.735542°E), Natal and Umgazana (31.702024°S 29.415939°E), Eastern Cape, South Africa. A specimen from Pointe Evatra, South Madagascar (24°58.1′S 47°6.1′E) was sequenced for three genes in a landmark study which resulted in the description of 17 new species of Hypselodoris.

== Description ==
Hypselodoris rudmani has a translucent body dotted with white patches, and covered in small blue spots. The gills and rhinophores are white, tipped with orange. Hypselodoris rudmani is a member of a large clade that includes Hypselodoris katherinae, Hypselodoris paradisa, Hypselodoris maritima, Hypselodoris skyleri and Hypselodoris bertschi.

This species can reach a total length of at least 25 mm.
