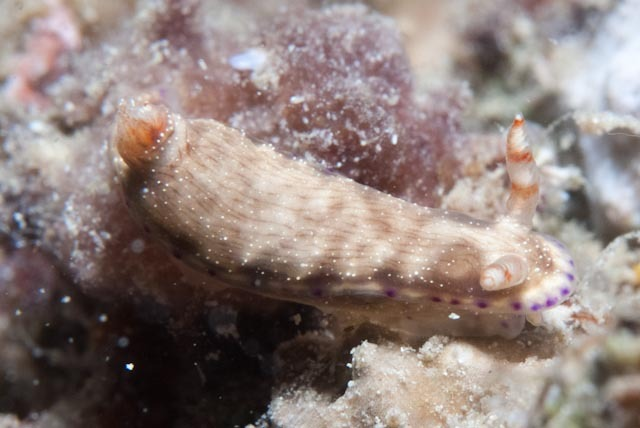

Scientific classification
- Kingdom: Animalia
- Phylum: Mollusca
- Class: Gastropoda
- Order: Nudibranchia
- Family: Chromodorididae
- Genus: Hypselodoris
- Species: H. skyleri

Binomial name
- Hypselodoris skyleri Gosliner & Johnson, 2018

= Hypselodoris skyleri =

Species of gastropod

Hypselodoris skyleri is a species of sea slug or dorid nudibranch, a marine gastropod mollusc in the family Chromodorididae.

== Distribution ==
This nudibranch was described from Tingloy, Batangas, Luzon, Philippines, 13.68736°N 120.83283°E. It is known only from Papua New Guinea.

== Description ==
Hypselodoris skyleri has a white body with raised opaque white spots scattered evenly on the mantle and sides of the body. There are irregular pale brown lines running along the mantle and a series of purple spots around the edge of the mantle and foot. The gills are off white, with bright orange on the outer faces. The rhinophores have white clubs with three orange rings and a transparent shaft. The colour pattern and body shape are similar to Hypselodoris decorata and Hypselodoris maculosa but this species is not in the same clade according to DNA results, which suggest that its closest relatives are Hypselodoris paradisa and Hypselodoris katherinae.

This species is small, measuring only up to 15 mm.
