= H. carnea =

H. carnea may refer to:

- Hydractinia carnea, an athecate hydroid
- Hypocrea carnea, a sac fungus
- Hyposmocoma carnea, a moth endemic to Kauai
- Hypselodoris carnea, a sea slug
