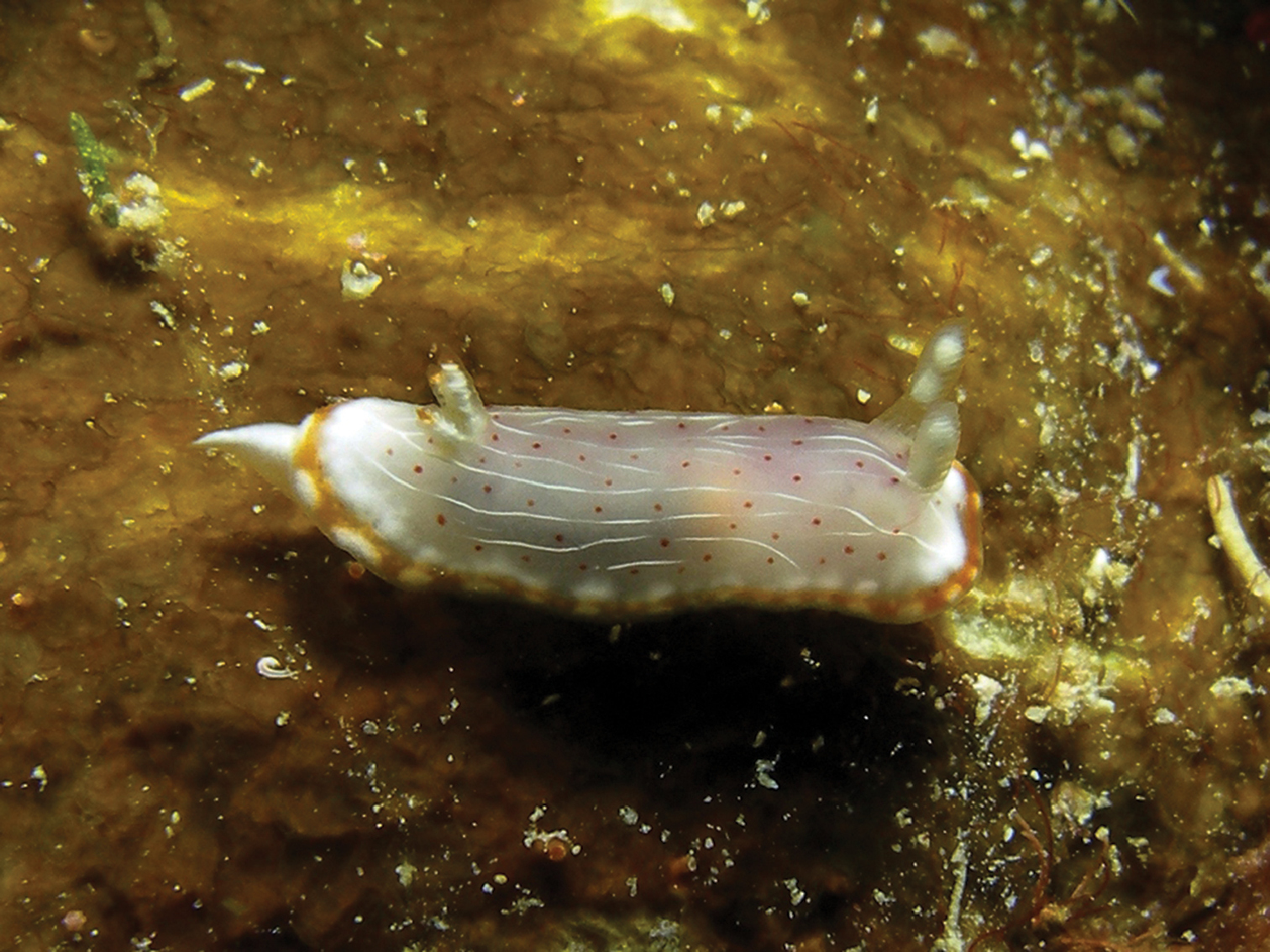
- Goniobranchus pseudodecorus

Scientific classification
- Kingdom: Animalia
- Phylum: Mollusca
- Class: Gastropoda
- Order: Nudibranchia
- Family: Chromodorididae
- Genus: Goniobranchus
- Species: G. pseudodecorus

Binomial name
- Goniobranchus pseudodecorus Yonow, 2018

= Goniobranchus pseudodecorus =

Species of gastropod

Goniobranchus pseudodecorus is a species of sea slug, a dorid nudibranch, a shell-less marine gastropod mollusk in the family Chromodorididae.

== Distribution ==
This species was described from Hotel Zabargad, 120 km south of Marsa Alam, Egypt with additional material from Hurghada, Eilat and Quseir, Egypt and Jeddah, Saudi Arabia. It was reported by Eliot (1908) from Khor Dongola in the Sudanese Red Sea as a pale variety of Chromodoris maculosa.

== Description ==
Goniobranchus pseudodecorus has a translucent white or pale orange mantle with longitudinal, irregular opaque white lines and striations. Between these lines are small round magenta spots. There is an opaque white area towards the edge of the mantle which is more extensive at the head and behind the gill. At the edge of the mantle there is an orange band with regularly spaced white breaks or spots. The rhinophores and gill leaflets are translucent with some orange and some white markings.
