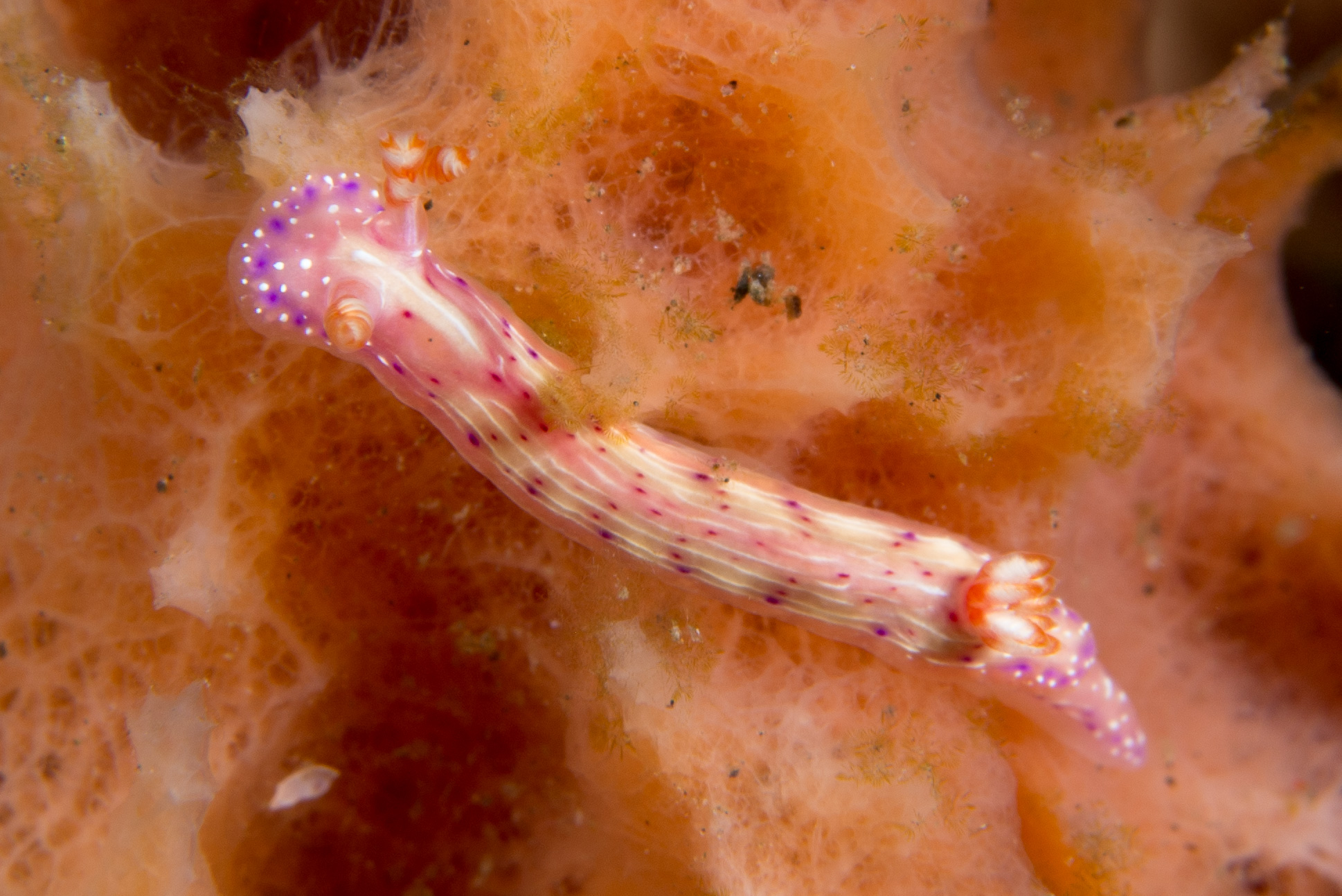
- Sangeang, Indonesia

Scientific classification
- Kingdom: Animalia
- Phylum: Mollusca
- Class: Gastropoda
- Order: Nudibranchia
- Family: Chromodorididae
- Genus: Hypselodoris
- Species: H. paradisa

Binomial name
- Hypselodoris paradisa Gosliner & Johnson, 2018

= Hypselodoris paradisa =

Species of gastropod

Hypselodoris paradisa is a species of sea slug or dorid nudibranch, a marine gastropod mollusc in the family Chromodorididae.

== Distribution ==
This nudibranch was described from Pig Island, Madang Lagoon, Madang, Papua New Guinea, 5.1634°S 145.83833°E. It is known only from Papua New Guinea.

== Description ==
Hypselodoris paradisa has a translucent pink body, with opaque white spots and diffuse purple markings at the head, tail, and back of the mantle, and a series of longitudinal dashed lines of white on the mantle. There are dark wine-red spots scattered evenly on the mantle, larger and more numerous at the edge. The gills are off-white, with red tips and red on the outer faces. The rhinophores have off-white clubs with three orange rings and a transparent shaft. The colour pattern and body shape are similar to Hypselodoris decorata and Hypselodoris maculosa but this species is not in the same clade according to DNA results, which suggest that its closest relatives are Hypselodoris skyleri and Hypselodoris katherinae.

This species is small, the holotype measured only 10 mm.
