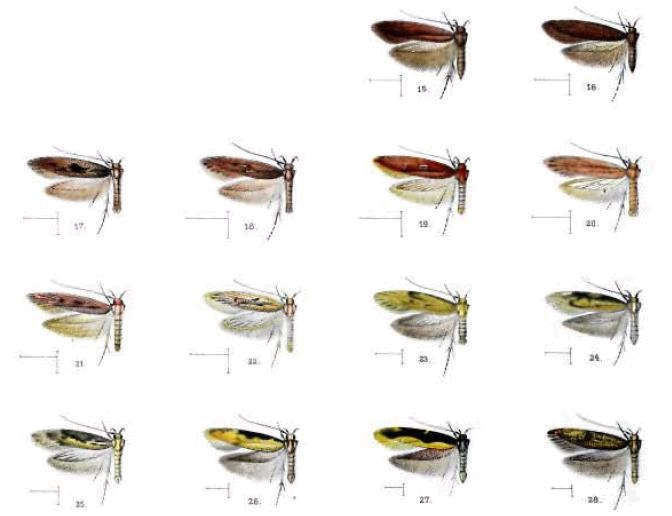
- Illustrations in Fauna Hawaiiensis: 15. Hyposmocoma sideritis, 16. Hyposmocoma obscura, 17. Hyposmocoma scandens, 18. Hyposmocoma maestella, 19. Hyposmocoma fulvocervina, 20. Hyposmocoma carnea, 21. Hyposmocoma roseofulva, 22. Hyposmocoma subsericea, 23. Hyposmocoma ochreocervina, 24. Hyposmocoma syrrhaptes, 25. Hyposmocoma paradoxa, 26. Hyposmocoma mimema, 27. Hyposmocoma bella, 28. Hyposmocoma rusius

Scientific classification
- Domain: Eukaryota
- Kingdom: Animalia
- Phylum: Arthropoda
- Class: Insecta
- Order: Lepidoptera
- Family: Cosmopterigidae
- Genus: Hyposmocoma
- Species: H. ochreocervina

Binomial name
- Hyposmocoma ochreocervina Walsingham, 1907

= Hyposmocoma ochreocervina =

Species of moth

Hyposmocoma ochreocervina is a species of moth of the family Cosmopterigidae. It was first described by Lord Walsingham in 1907.

It is endemic to the Hawaiian island of Oahu. The type locality ìs the Waianae Range, where it was collected at an elevation of 3,000 feet (910 m).

The food plant is unknown, but the moths were found on Metrosideros.
