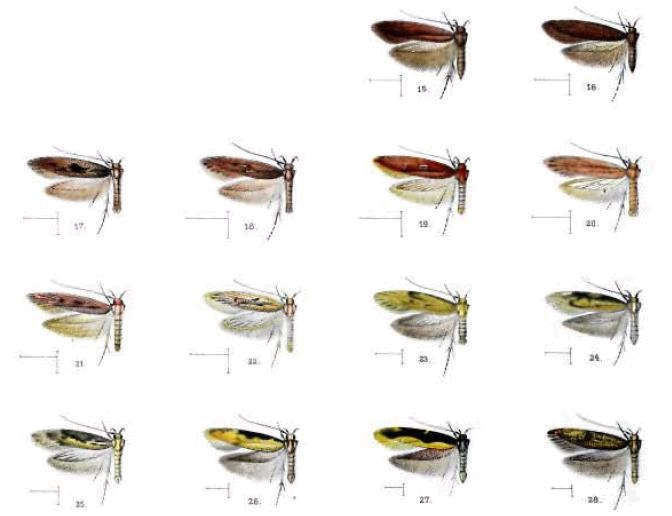
- Illustrations in Fauna Hawaiiensis: 15. Hyposmocoma sideritis, 16. Hyposmocoma obscura, 17. Hyposmocoma scandens, 18. Hyposmocoma maestella, 19. Hyposmocoma fulvocervina, 20. Hyposmocoma carnea, 21. Hyposmocoma roseofulva, 22. Hyposmocoma subsericea, 23. Hyposmocoma ochreocervina, 24. Hyposmocoma syrrhaptes, 25. Hyposmocoma paradoxa, 26. Hyposmocoma mimema, 27. Hyposmocoma bella, 28. Hyposmocoma rusius

Scientific classification
- Domain: Eukaryota
- Kingdom: Animalia
- Phylum: Arthropoda
- Class: Insecta
- Order: Lepidoptera
- Family: Cosmopterigidae
- Genus: Hyposmocoma
- Species: H. roseofulva

Binomial name
- Hyposmocoma roseofulva Walsingham, 1907

= Hyposmocoma roseofulva =

Species of moth

Hyposmocoma roseofulva is a species of moth of the family Cosmopterigidae. It was first described by Lord Walsingham in 1907. It is endemic to the Hawaiian island of Kauai.
