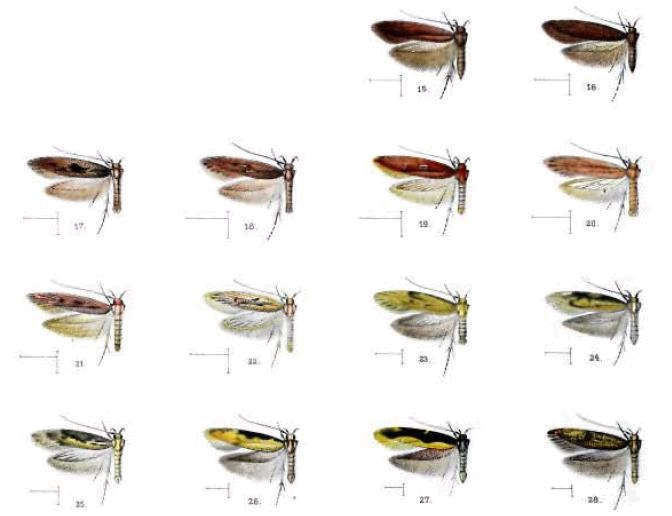
- Illustrations in Fauna Hawaiiensis: 15. Hyposmocoma sideritis, 16. Hyposmocoma obscura, 17. Hyposmocoma scandens, 18. Hyposmocoma maestella, 19. Hyposmocoma fulvocervina, 20. Hyposmocoma carnea, 21. Hyposmocoma roseofulva, 22. Hyposmocoma subsericea, 23. Hyposmocoma ochreocervina, 24. Hyposmocoma syrrhaptes, 25. Hyposmocoma paradoxa, 26. Hyposmocoma mimema, 27. Hyposmocoma bella, 28. Hyposmocoma rusius

Scientific classification
- Domain: Eukaryota
- Kingdom: Animalia
- Phylum: Arthropoda
- Class: Insecta
- Order: Lepidoptera
- Family: Cosmopterigidae
- Genus: Hyposmocoma
- Species: H. sideritis

Binomial name
- Hyposmocoma sideritis Walsingham, 1907

= Hyposmocoma sideritis =

Species of moth

Hyposmocoma sideritis is a species of moth of the family Cosmopterigidae. It was first described by Lord Walsingham in 1907. It is endemic to the Hawaiian island of Maui. The type locality is Olinda, where it was collected at an elevation of 4,000 feet (1,200 m).
