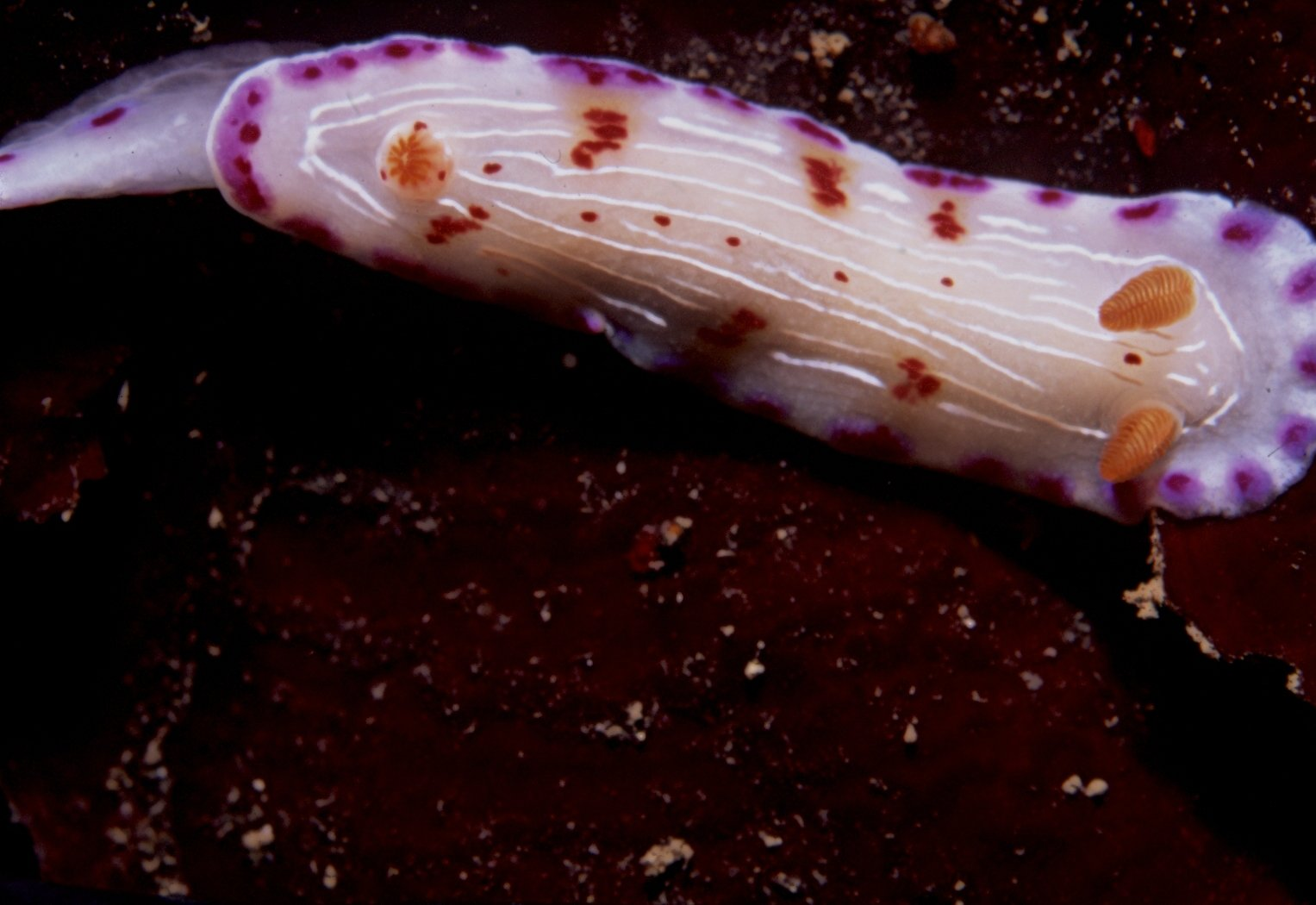

Scientific classification
- Kingdom: Animalia
- Phylum: Mollusca
- Class: Gastropoda
- Order: Nudibranchia
- Family: Chromodorididae
- Genus: Hypselodoris
- Species: H. capensis

Binomial name
- Hypselodoris capensis (Barnard, 1927)

Synonyms
- Glossodoris capensis Barnard, 1927

= Cape dorid =

Species of gastropod

The Cape dorid (Hypselodoris capensis) is a species of sea slug, a dorid nudibranch. It is a marine gastropod mollusc in the family Chromodorididae.

== Distribution ==
This species can found around the South African coast from the Cape Peninsula to the Wild Coast subtidally to at least 20 m. It is probably endemic.

== Description ==
The Cape dorid is a white-bodied dorid with a smooth skin. It has opaque white lines along the notum and irregular reddish-orange spots. It has a broken blue-purple margin. It has eight gills arranged around the anus and its rhinophores are perfoliate. The rhinophores and gill edges are orange. It may reach a total length of 50 mm. This species is very similar in appearance to Hypselodoris carnea.

== Ecology ==
This species feeds on an undescribed pale blue sponge. Its egg ribbon is a creamy collar of several whorls.

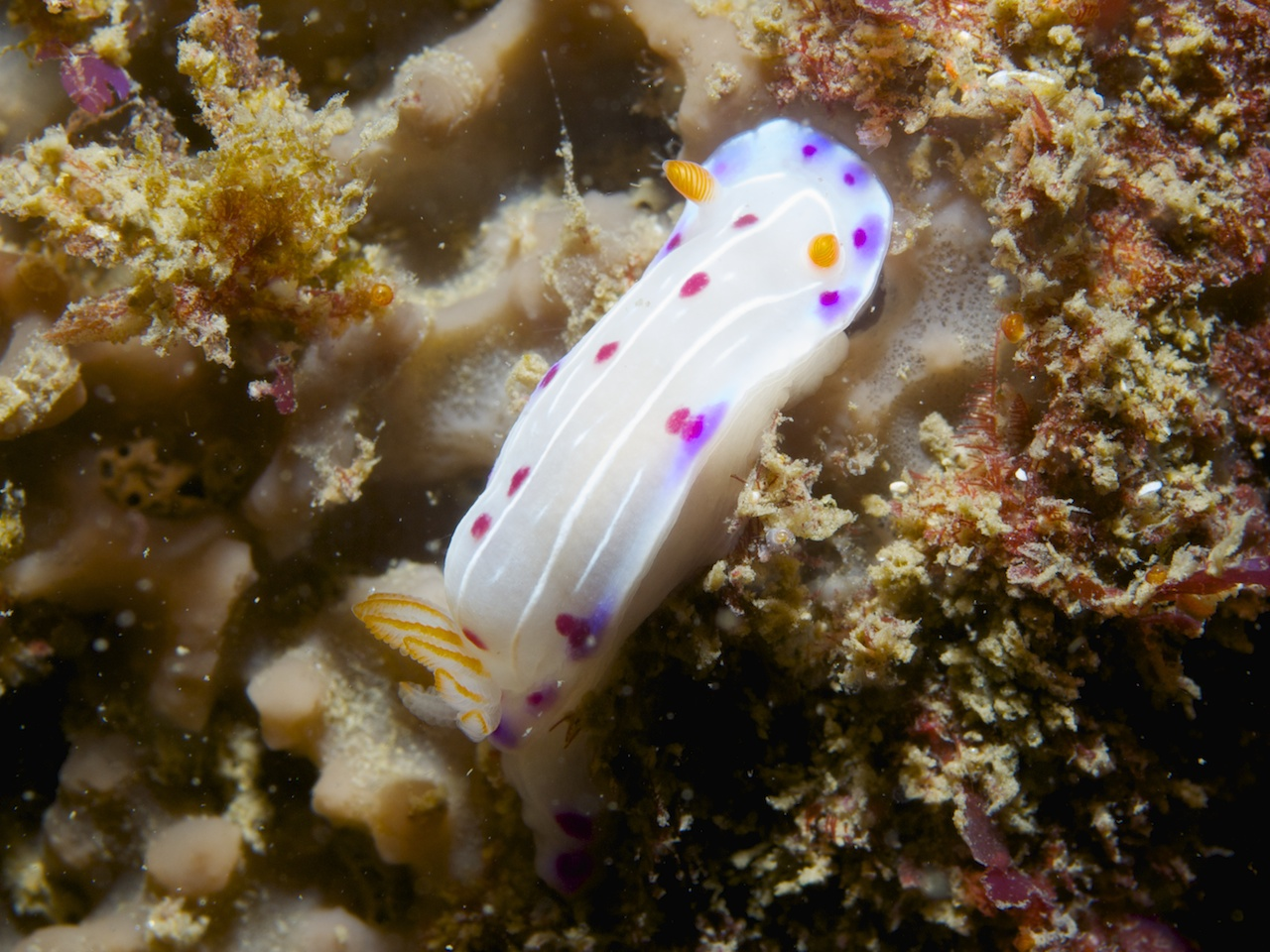
Specimen feeding on sponge
