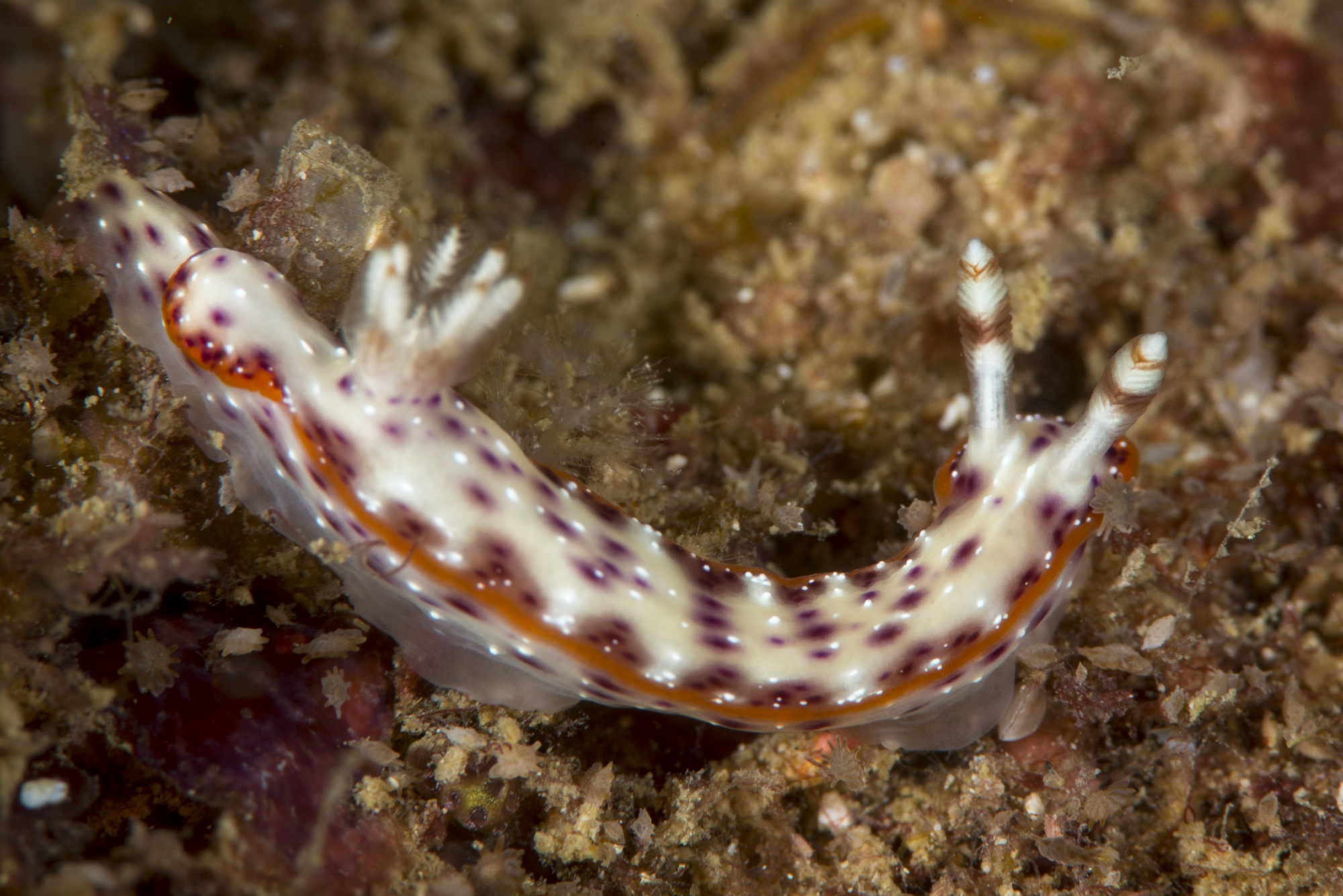
- Weligama, Sri Lanka

Scientific classification
- Kingdom: Animalia
- Phylum: Mollusca
- Class: Gastropoda
- Order: Nudibranchia
- Family: Chromodorididae
- Genus: Hypselodoris
- Species: H. juniperae

Binomial name
- Hypselodoris juniperae Gosliner & Johnson, 2018

= Hypselodoris juniperae =

Species of gastropod

Hypselodoris juniperae is a species of sea slug or dorid nudibranch, a marine gastropod mollusc in the family Chromodorididae. It has previously been confused with Hypselodoris maculosa.

== Distribution ==
This nudibranch was described from a reef wall, west of Nosy Valiha, Îles Radama, Madagascar, 14.157833°S 47.6485°E. It is also reported as possibly being present in Sri Lanka, South Africa and Reunion Island.

== Description ==
Hypselodoris juniperae has previously been confused with Hypselodoris maculosa. The mantle is translucent white with a series of longitudinal opaque white lines running down its length. Small dark blue spots are arranged at regular intervals between these lines and just inside the opaque white mantle margin. The gills are white with an orange band and the same colour pattern is present on the rhinophores.
