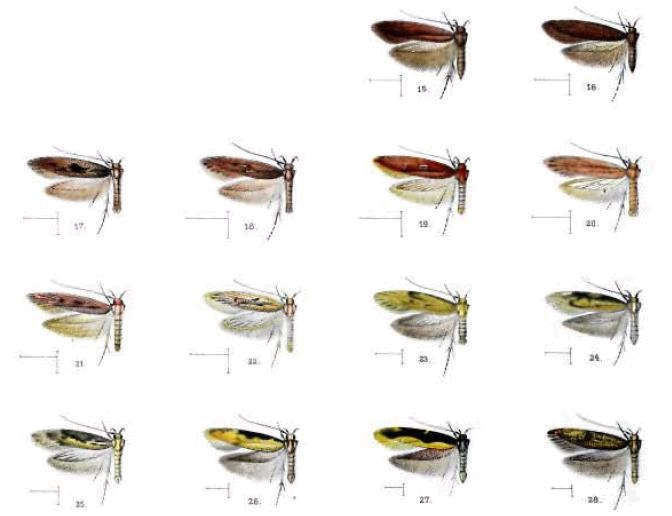
- Illustrations in Fauna Hawaiiensis: 15. Hyposmocoma sideritis, 16. Hyposmocoma obscura, 17. Hyposmocoma scandens, 18. Hyposmocoma maestella, 19. Hyposmocoma fulvocervina, 20. Hyposmocoma carnea, 21. Hyposmocoma roseofulva, 22. Hyposmocoma subsericea, 23. Hyposmocoma ochreocervina, 24. Hyposmocoma syrrhaptes, 25. Hyposmocoma paradoxa, 26. Hyposmocoma mimema, 27. Hyposmocoma bella, 28. Hyposmocoma rusius

Scientific classification
- Domain: Eukaryota
- Kingdom: Animalia
- Phylum: Arthropoda
- Class: Insecta
- Order: Lepidoptera
- Family: Cosmopterigidae
- Genus: Hyposmocoma
- Species: H. mimema

Binomial name
- Hyposmocoma mimema Walsingham, 1907

= Hyposmocoma mimema =

Species of moth

Hyposmocoma mimema is a species of moth of the family Cosmopterigidae. It is endemic to the Hawaiian island of Maui. The type locality is Haleakalā, where it was collected at an elevation of 4,000 to 5,000 feet (1,200 to 1,500 m).
