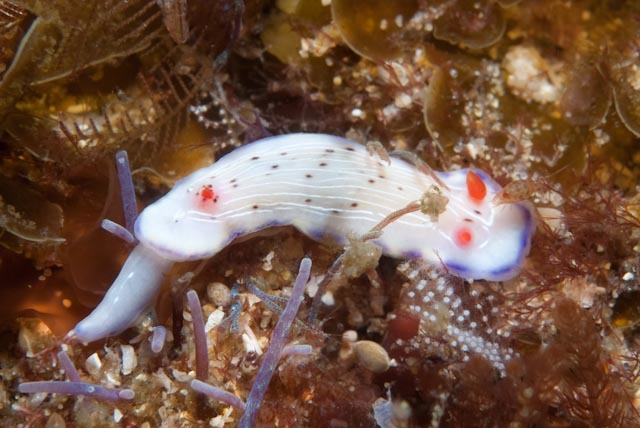

Scientific classification
- Kingdom: Animalia
- Phylum: Mollusca
- Class: Gastropoda
- Order: Nudibranchia
- Family: Chromodorididae
- Genus: Hypselodoris
- Species: H. carnea

Binomial name
- Hypselodoris carnea (Bergh, 1889)

Synonyms
- Chromodoris carnea Bergh, 1889 (basionym)

= Hypselodoris carnea =

Species of gastropod

Hypselodoris carnea is a species of colourful sea slug or dorid nudibranch, a marine gastropod mollusc in the family Chromodorididae.

== Distribution ==
This nudibranch was described from Île aux Fouquets, Grand Port, Mauritius. It is frequently reported from South Africa, along the KwaZulu-Natal coast but these animals differ considerably from the original description.

== Description ==
Hypselodoris carnea has a flesh-red mantle with six (rarely five) longitudinal white lines, white spots and carmine spots between the lines. The edge of the mantle is yellow-red. It was described as reaching a total length of 22 mm alive. There is wide range of colour variation reported for this species and South African animals have many white lines instead of six, suggesting a species complex. It is said to be easily mistaken for Hypselodoris capensis and perhaps species of the Hypselodoris maculosa complex. It feeds on sponges.
