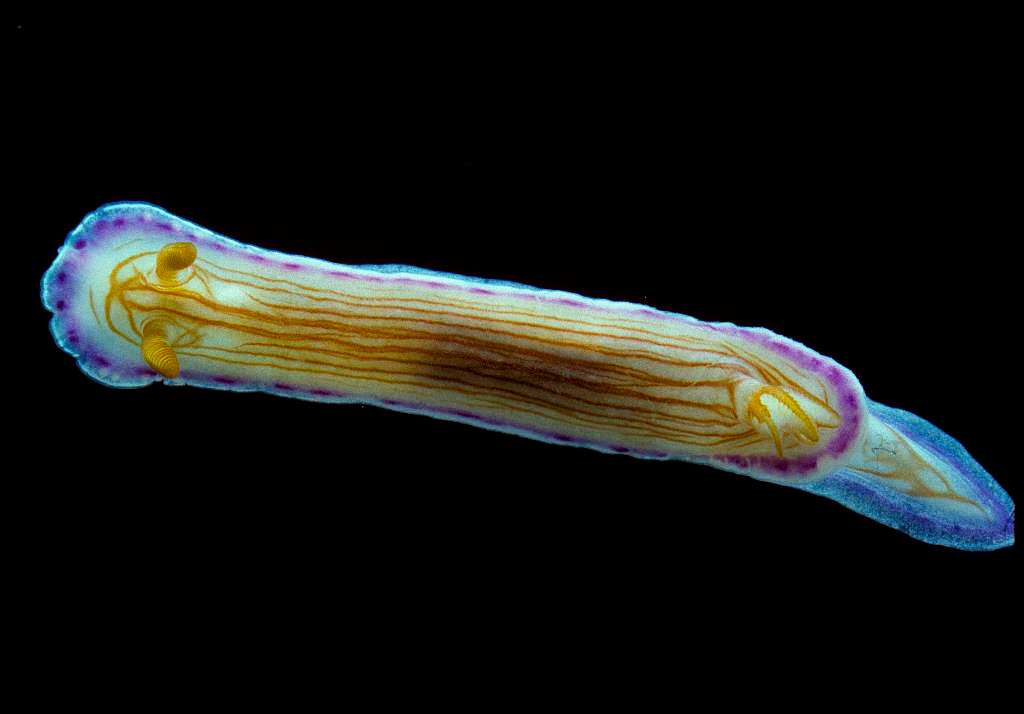
- Taiwan, North Coast.

Scientific classification
- Kingdom: Animalia
- Phylum: Mollusca
- Class: Gastropoda
- Order: Nudibranchia
- Family: Chromodorididae
- Genus: Hypselodoris
- Species: H. katherinae

Binomial name
- Hypselodoris katherinae Gosliner & Johnson, 2018

= Hypselodoris katherinae =

Species of gastropod

Hypselodoris katherinae is a species of sea slug or dorid nudibranch, a marine gastropod mollusc in the family Chromodorididae.

== Distribution ==
This nudibranch was described from Pulau Chebeh, off the NW tip of Tioman Island, eastern Malaysia, 2.932983°N 104.098690°E. It is also reported from the Philippines, Indonesia and Taiwan.

== Description ==
Hypselodoris katherinae has previously been confused with Hypselodoris carnea. The mantle is translucent pale pink with a series of longitudinal red-brown lines running down its length. These lines may be broken into short segments and may branch and anastomose. Small blue-purple diffuse spots are arranged at the mantle margin and may coalesce into a continuous line. The gills are white with orange lines on the rachis and the rhinophores are red to orange in colour. This species can reach a total length of 32 mm.
