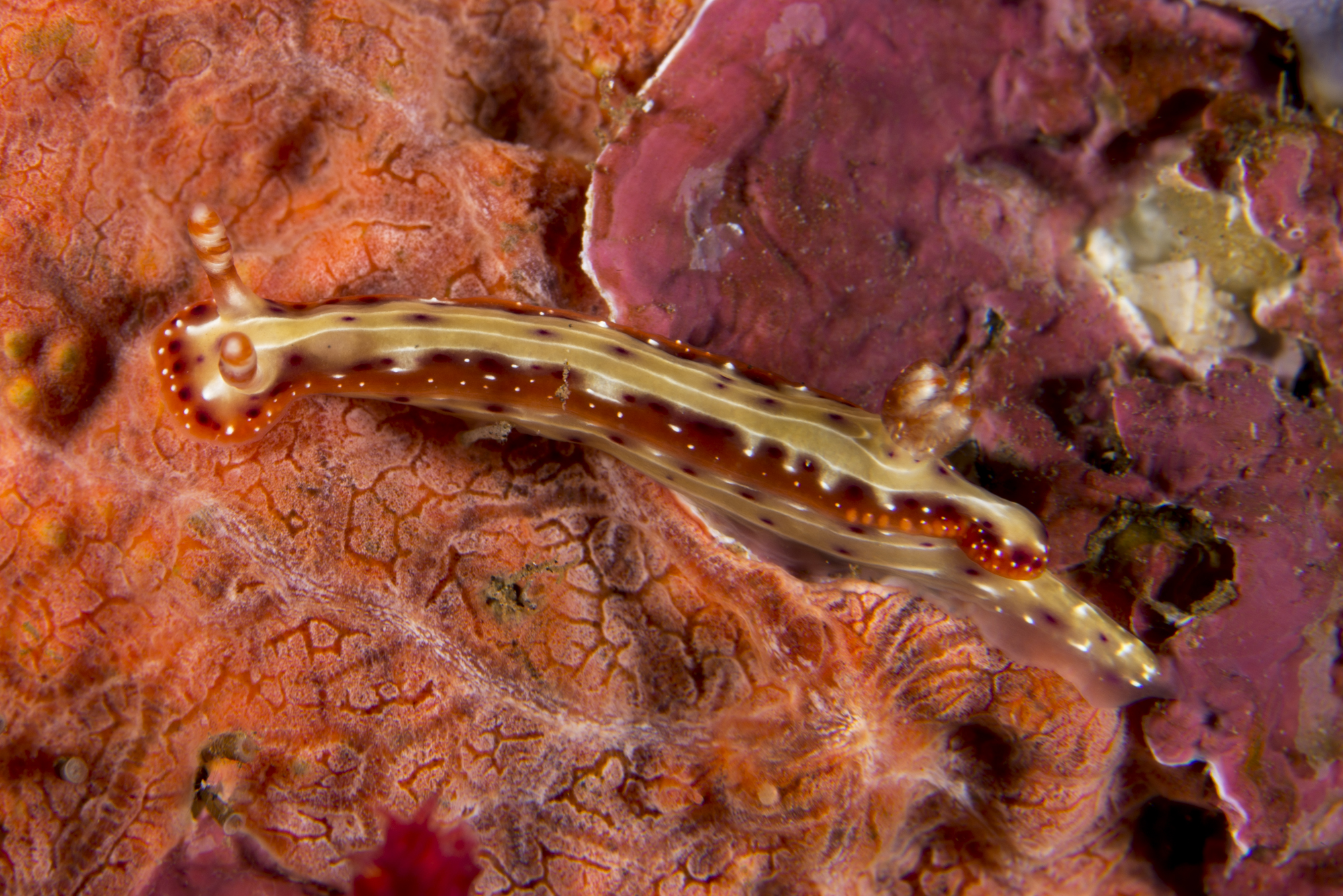
- Tulamben, Bali, Indonesia

Scientific classification
- Kingdom: Animalia
- Phylum: Mollusca
- Class: Gastropoda
- Order: Nudibranchia
- Family: Chromodorididae
- Genus: Hypselodoris
- Species: H. decorata

Binomial name
- Hypselodoris decorata Risbec, 1928

= Hypselodoris decorata =

Species of gastropod

Hypselodoris decorata is a species of sea slug or dorid nudibranch, a marine gastropod mollusk in the family Chromodorididae.

== Distribution ==
This nudibranch was described from New Caledonia. It is reported from the Marshall Islands, Vanuatu, Indonesia, Papua New Guinea, the Philippines and Malaysia.

== Description ==
Hypselodoris decorata has a translucent cream to pink body with a broad brown band at the edge of the mantle and four thin opaque white lines on its dorsum. Between these lines are rows of red to purple spots. The anterior end is usually light-purple in colour with white and dark purple spots and the gills have bright red-orange pigment on the apices and outer surfaces. The rhinophores are white, with two red bands on the club and another at the base of the club. This species can reach a total length of at least 25 mm. Previously considered to be a colour variety of Hypselodoris maculosa the distinctive features of this species were elucidated by an integrated molecular and morphological study.
