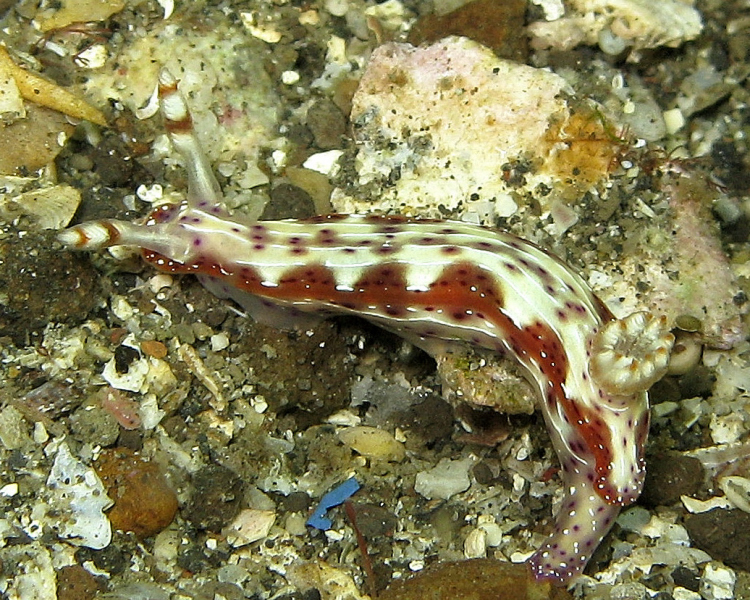

Scientific classification
- Kingdom: Animalia
- Phylum: Mollusca
- Class: Gastropoda
- Order: Nudibranchia
- Family: Chromodorididae
- Genus: Hypselodoris
- Species: H. maculosa

Binomial name
- Hypselodoris maculosa (Pease, 1871)

= Hypselodoris maculosa =

Species of gastropod

Hypselodoris maculosa is a species of sea slug or dorid nudibranch, a marine gastropod mollusk in the family Chromodorididae.

== Distribution ==
This nudibranch was described from Tahiti. It was thought to be widespread in the tropical Indo-Pacific Ocean with considerable variation in colour pattern. A study employing DNA sequencing and more careful comparison of morphological differences revealed that many of these colour variations were in fact separate species.

== Description ==
Hypselodoris maculosa has a cream body with a brown margin to the mantle and four longitudinal white lines on its dorsum. There are slightly elongate dark purple-black spots in single irregular rows between the white lines. The brown margin is partly edged in white but extends in patches into the back with clusters of dark spots in these patches. The anterior end of the mantle and the part behind the gills are light-purple in colour with white and dark purple spots. The rhinophores are white, with a broad brown band just above the start of the lamellae and a narrow orange band above this. The gill leaves are brown basally, then white, with orange tips. It can be distinguished from Hypselodoris decorata by having two instead of three rings on the rhinophores and details of the colouration. Hypselodoris yarae, Hypselodoris paradisa, Hypselodoris juniperae and several other species have previously been confused with Hypselodoris maculosa.

This species can reach a total length of at least 32 mm and has been observed feeding on grey sponges from the genus Euryspongia.
