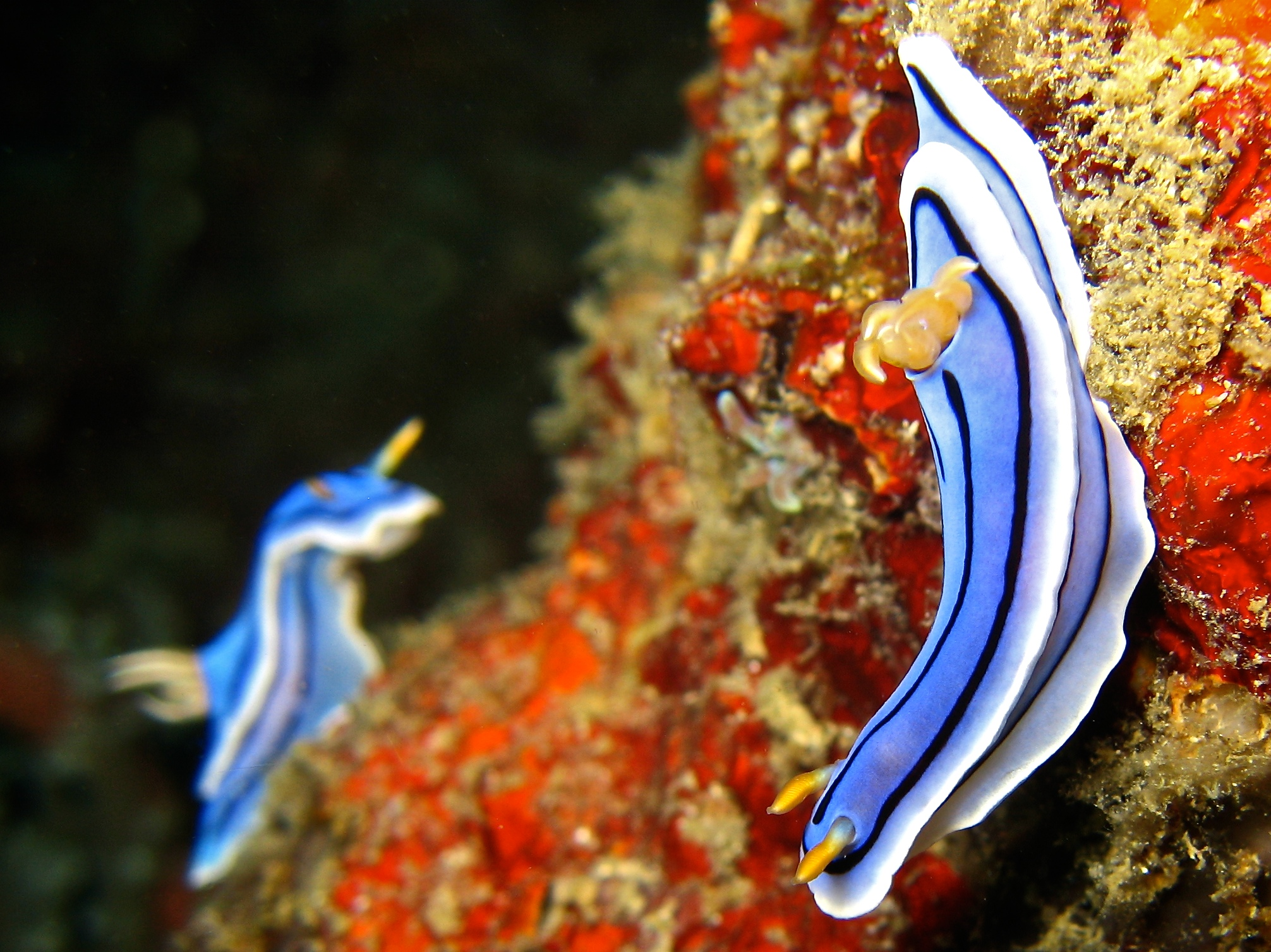
- Chromodoris lochi
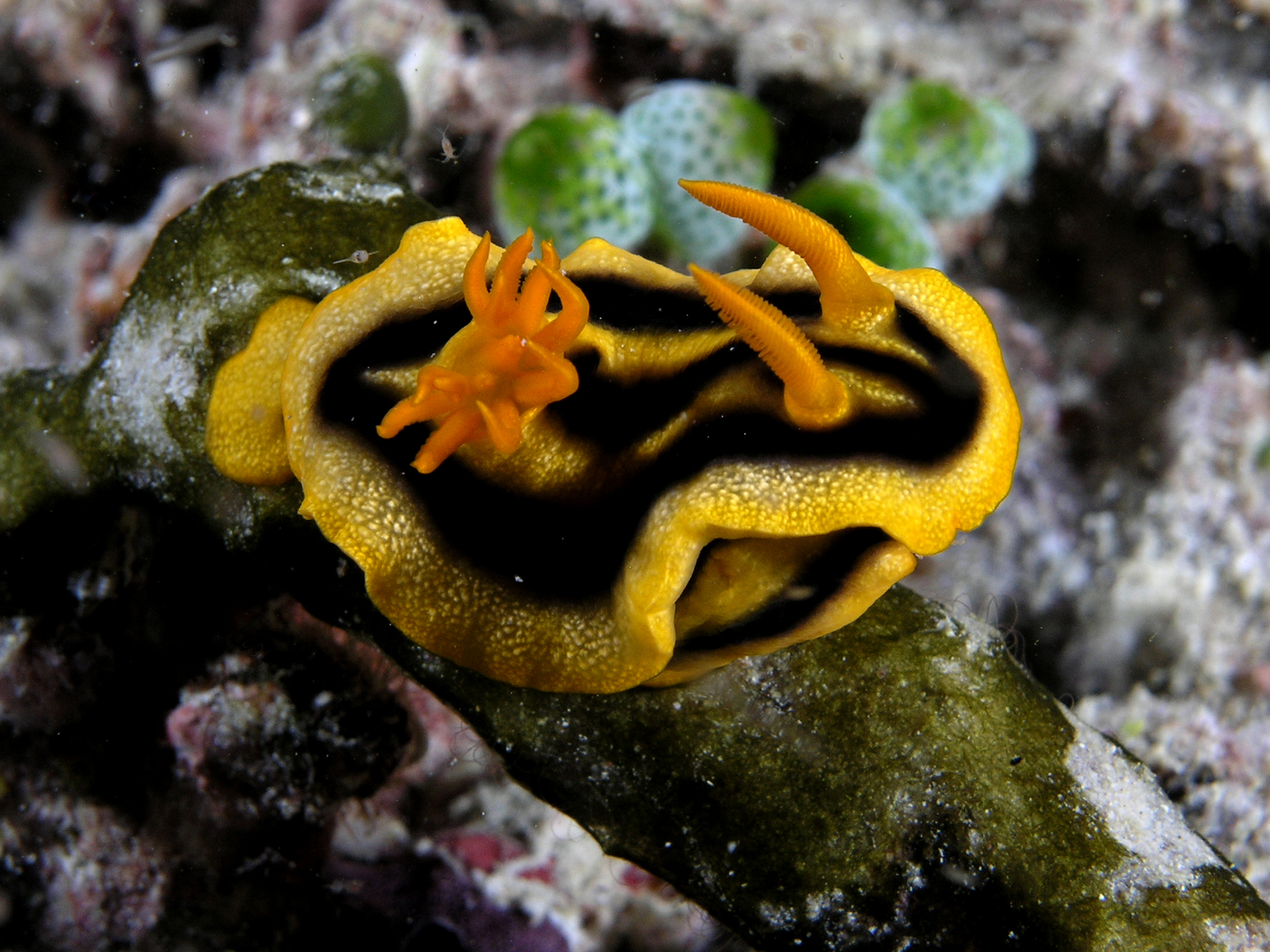
- Chromodoris joshi in the Komodo National Park

Scientific classification
- Kingdom: Animalia
- Phylum: Mollusca
- Class: Gastropoda
- Order: Nudibranchia
- Family: Chromodorididae
- Genus: Chromodoris; Alder & Hancock, 1855

Type species
- Doris magnifica Quoy & Gaimard, 1832

Species
- See text

Synonyms
- Actinodoris Ehrenberg, 1831 (Invalid: Placed on the Official Index by ICZN Opinion 1375); Doris (Actinodoris) Ehrenberg, 1831; Glossodoris (Chromodoris) Alder & Hancock, 1855

= Chromodoris =

Genus of gastropods

Chromodoris is a genus of very colourful sea slugs or dorid nudibranchs, marine gastropod molluscs, and the type genus of the family Chromodorididae. Within the genus Chromodoris, there are currently 101 classified species. Species within Chromodoris are commonly found in tropical and subtropical waters, living as members of reef communities and preying primarily on sponges. A molecular phylogeny of the family Chromodorididae resulted in this genus being restricted to a smaller number of species than formerly, most of which have longitudinal black lines on the mantle. Many former members of Chromodoris were transferred to Goniobranchus

== Anatomy ==
Chromodoris species exhibit one of the two major body types found within Nudibranchia. There are a few major bodily features that separate chromodorids from other sea slugs.

=== Mantle ===
Dorids have a thick mantle that exists over their foot, and in some species, the mantle can have tubercles (nodules along the surface of an organism that are made of keratin) of different concentrations, shapes, and sizes, providing some rigidity and protection for their soft, shell-less bodies. In most dorid species, the mantle holds toxins that defend the organism that are obtained through their diet.

=== Respiratory system ===
Chromodorids breathe oxygen principally through their gills, usually positioned in a featherlike structure located around the anus at their posterior, called the branchial plume.

== Phylogeny and taxonomy ==
The classification of the family Chromodorididae has been the subject of many studies on nudibranches in recent years, most focusing on the phylogeny and its impact on the traditional taxonomies of the genera. Chromodoris was long considered to be the most diverse genus of the Chromodorididae; however, a study published in July 2018 on Indo-pacific species of chromodorid nudibranchs has shown that the genus should be categorized more strictly, and has been narrowed down to 22 species. These species characteristically have black stripes along their bodies and linear spawning.

== Chemical defenses ==
Chromodorid nudibranchs commonly exhibit chemical defenses to protect themselves from predators. Most of the species that exhibit this behavior make use of bioactive compounds like alkaloids, diterpenes, and sesquiterpenes from the sponges they feed on. Nudibranchs can collect these compounds and store them as is, transform them, or be selectively sequestered, although there is no information on how common each mechanism is and which individual species exhibit the individual methods. Chromodorid nudibranchs in particular transport and store their toxic compounds in specialized storage glands located in strategic locations throughout the mantle, called mantle dermal formations (MDFs). These MDFs have been shown to harbor extremely high concentrations of distasteful and potent compounds in comparison to the rest of their body.

== Reproduction ==
All nudibranchs are simultaneous hermaphrodites, with each individual possessing both male and female reproductive structures. During mating, two individuals compete for the position of male by darting their penises at one another until the victor penetrates the body wall of the other and impregnating them, forcing them to act as the female, an act commonly called "penis fencing." From here, the female lays eggs into a substrate, which hatch planktonic vestigial veliger larva, who will further evolve into adults.

== Species ==
Species in the genus Chromodoris include:

- Chromodoris adeima Yonow, 1984
- Chromodoris africana Eliot, 1904
- Chromodoris aila Er. Marcus, 1961
- Chromodoris albolimbata Bergh, 1907
- Chromodoris albonotata Bergh, 1875
- Chromodoris alcalai Gosliner, 2021
- Chromodoris alternata Burn, 1957
- Chromodoris ambigua Rudman, 1987
- Chromodoris annae Bergh, 1877
- Chromodoris aspersa Gould, 1852
- Chromodoris balat Bonomo & Gosliner, 2020
- Chromodoris baqe Bonomo & Gosliner, 2020
- Chromodoris barnardi Collingwood, 1868 - Taxon inquirendum
- Chromodoris briqua Ev. Marcus & J. B. Burch, 1965
- Chromodoris buchananae Gosliner & Behrens, 2000
- Chromodoris burni Rudman, 1982
- Chromodoris camoena Bergh, 1879
- Chromodoris cardinalis Bergh, 1880
- Chromodoris celinae Tibiriçá, Pola, Ortigosa & Cervera, 2020
- Chromodoris citrina Bergh, 1874 - nomen dubium
- Chromodoris colemani Rudman, 1982
- Chromodoris dianae Gosliner & Behrens, 1998
- Chromodoris dictya Er. Marcus & Ev. Marcus, 1970
- Chromodoris elisabethina Bergh, 1877
- Chromodoris euelpis Bergh, 1907
- Chromodoris gonatophora Bergh, 1879
- Chromodoris hamiltoni Rudman, 1977
- Chromodoris helium Tibiriçá, Pola, Ortigosa & Cervera, 2020
- Chromodoris hilaris Bergh, 1890
- Chromodoris inconspicua Eliot, 1904
- Chromodoris inopinata Bergh, 1905
- Chromodoris iris Collingwood, 1881
- Chromodoris joshi Gosliner & Behrens, 1998
- Chromodoris kalawakan Bonomo & Gosliner, 2020
- Chromodoris kuiteri Rudman, 1982
- Chromodoris lapinigensis Bergh, 1879
- Chromodoris lata Risbec, 1928
- Chromodoris lentiginosa Pease, 1871
- Chromodoris lineolata Hasselt, 1824
- Chromodoris lochi Rudman, 1982
- Chromodoris magnifica Quoy & Gaimard, 1832 : Type species.
- Chromodoris mandapamensis Valdes, Mollo, & Ortea, 1999
- Chromodoris mariana Bergh, 1890
- Chromodoris marindica Yonow, 2001
- Chromodoris marpessa Bergh, 1905
- Chromodoris michaeli Gosliner & Behrens, 1998
- Chromodoris mollita Abraham, 1877 - Nomen dubium
- Chromodoris nodulosa Bergh, 1905
- Chromodoris nona Baba, 1953
- Chromodoris ophthalmica Bergh, 1905
- Chromodoris orientalis Rudman, 1983
- Chromodoris pantharella Bergh, 1879
- Chromodoris papulosa Bergh, 1905
- Chromodoris paupera Bergh, 1877
- Chromodoris perola Ev. Marcus, 1976
- Chromodoris porcata Bergh, 1889
- Chromodoris pruna Goslienr, 1994
- Chromodoris pustulans Bergh, 1877
- Chromodoris quadricolor Rueppell & Leuckart, 1828
- Chromodoris quagga Bonomo & Gosliner, 2020
- Chromodoris reticulata Pease, 1860
- Chromodoris rudolphi Bergh, 1880
- Chromodoris splendens Eliot, 1904
- Chromodoris sponsa Ehrenberg, 1831 - Nomen dubium
- Chromodoris striatella Bergh, 1877
- Chromodoris strigata Rudman, 1982
- Chromodoris tenuilinearis Farran, 1905
- Chromodoris tenuis Collingwood, 1881
- Chromodoris trouilloti Risbec, 1928
- Chromodoris venusta Bergh, 1905
- Chromodoris virginea Bergh, 1877
- Chromodoris westraliensis O'Donoghue, 1924
- Chromodoris willani Rudman, 1982
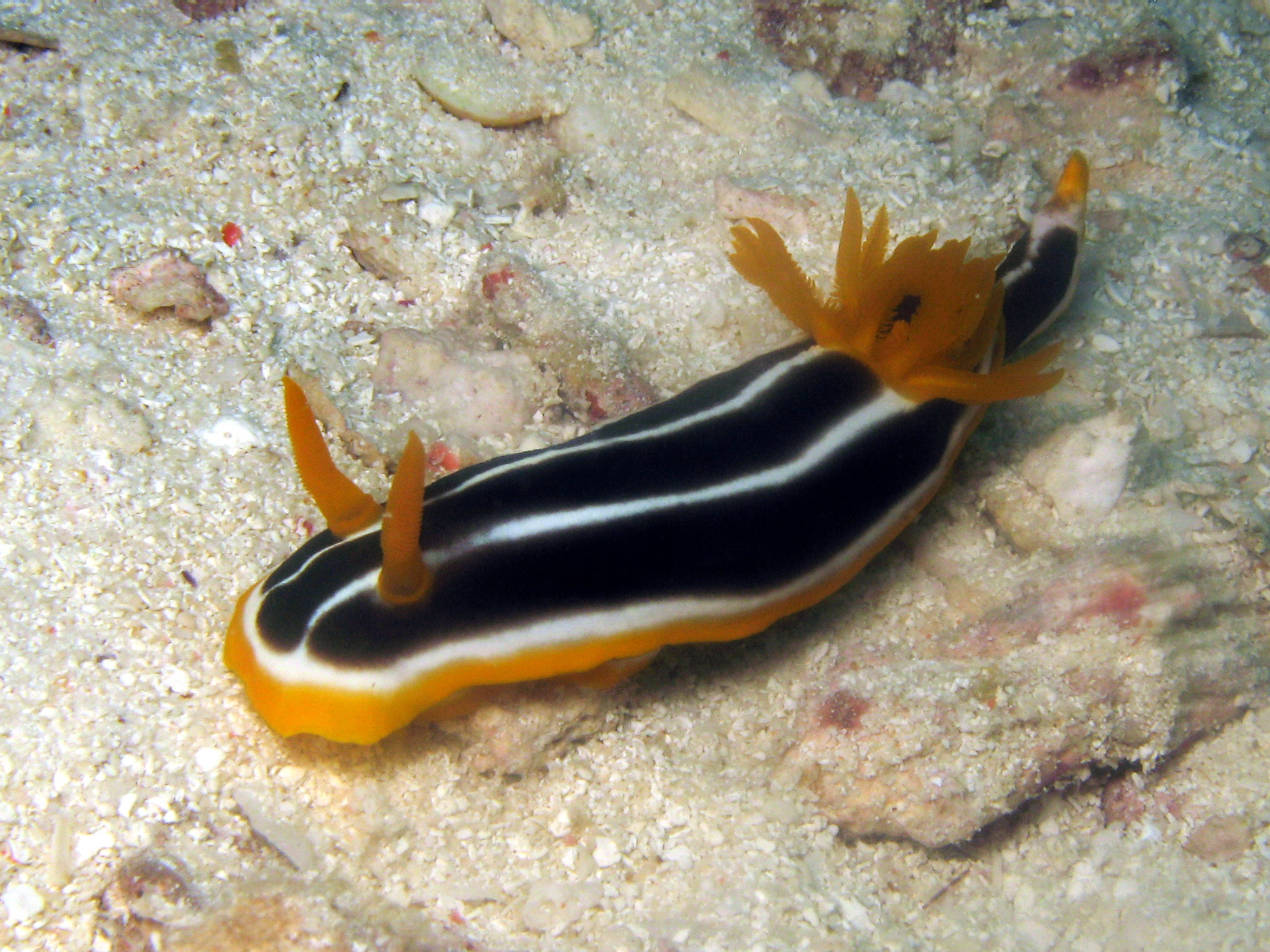
Chromodoris africana

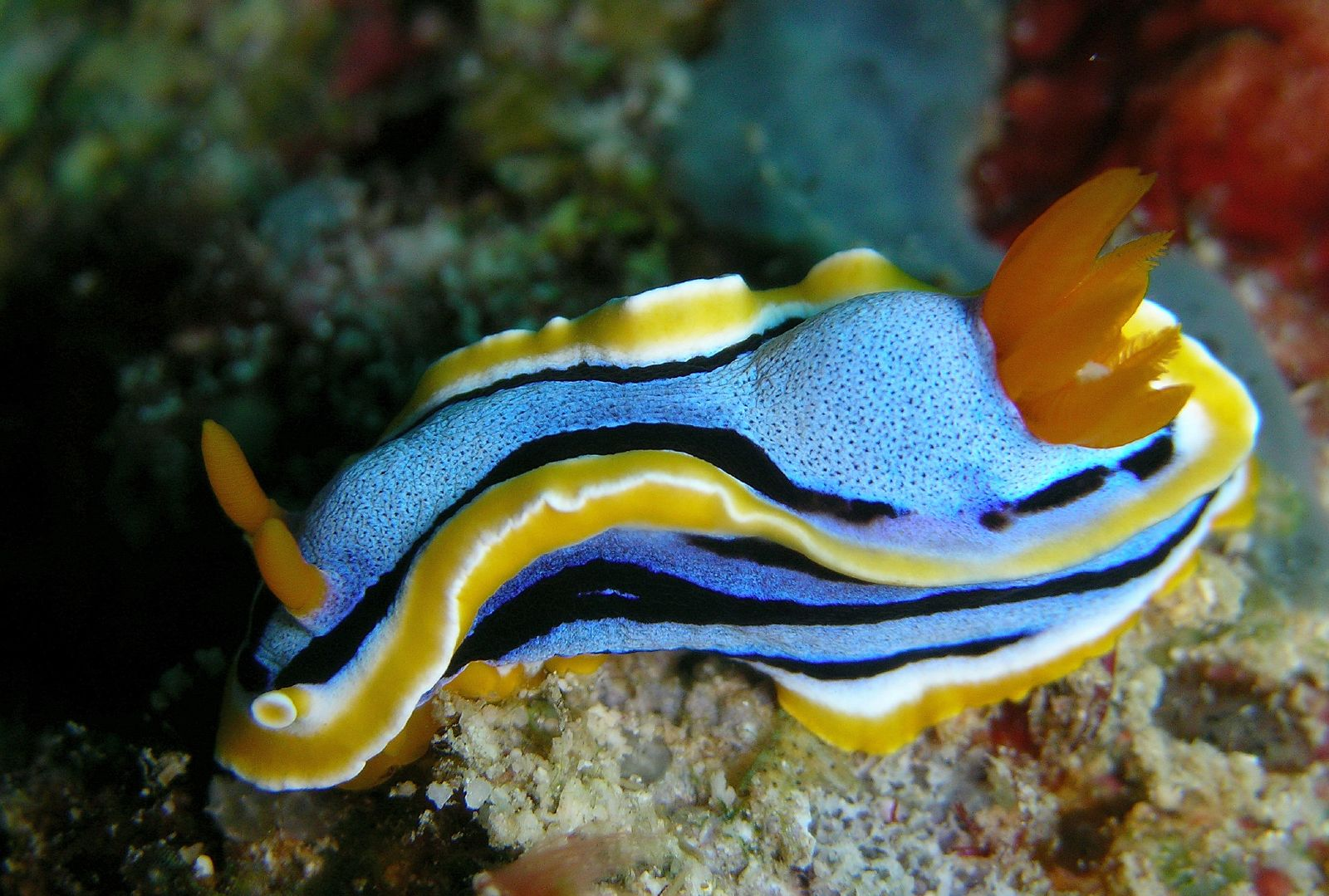
Chromodoris annae

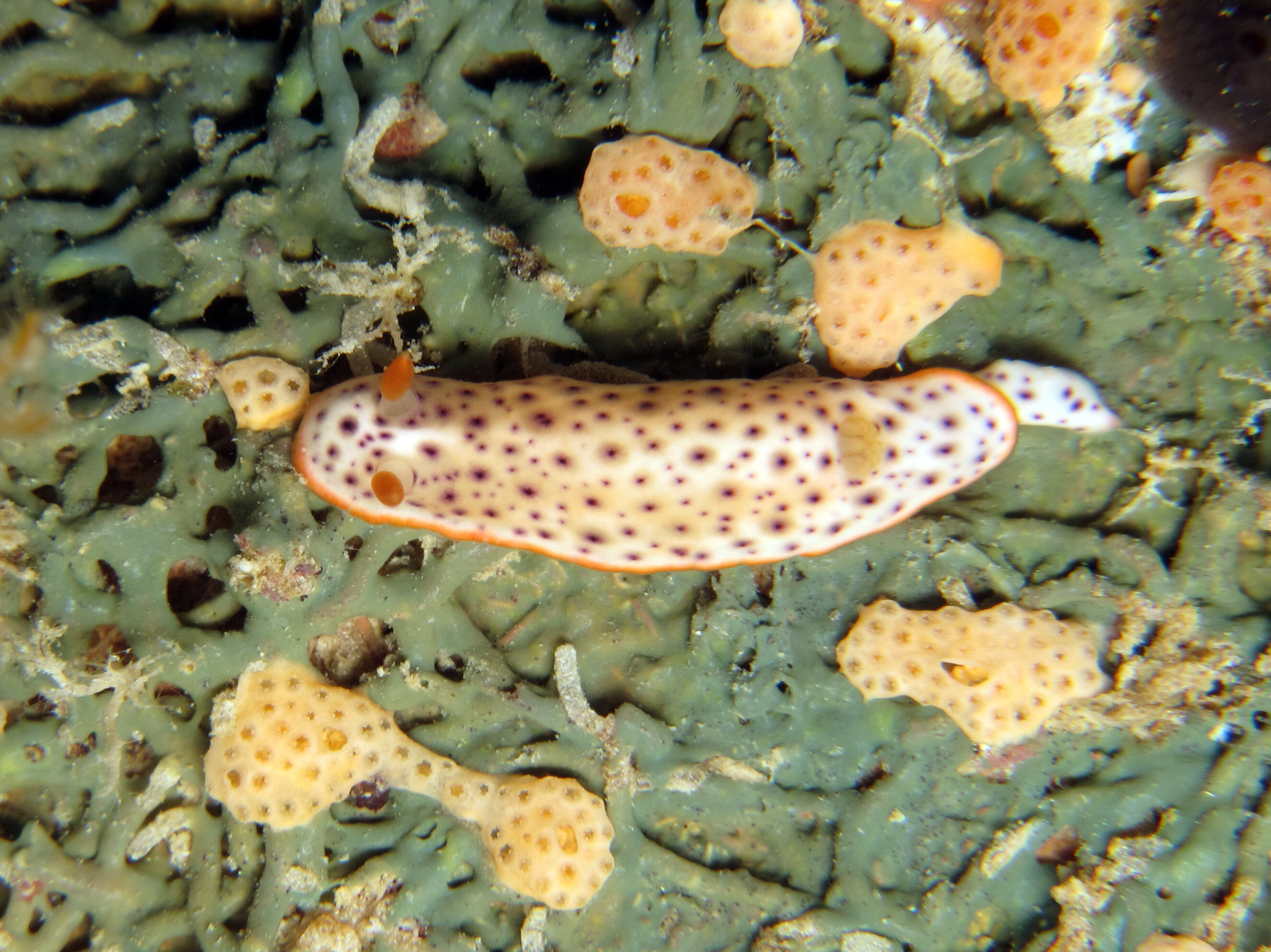
Chromodoris aspersa

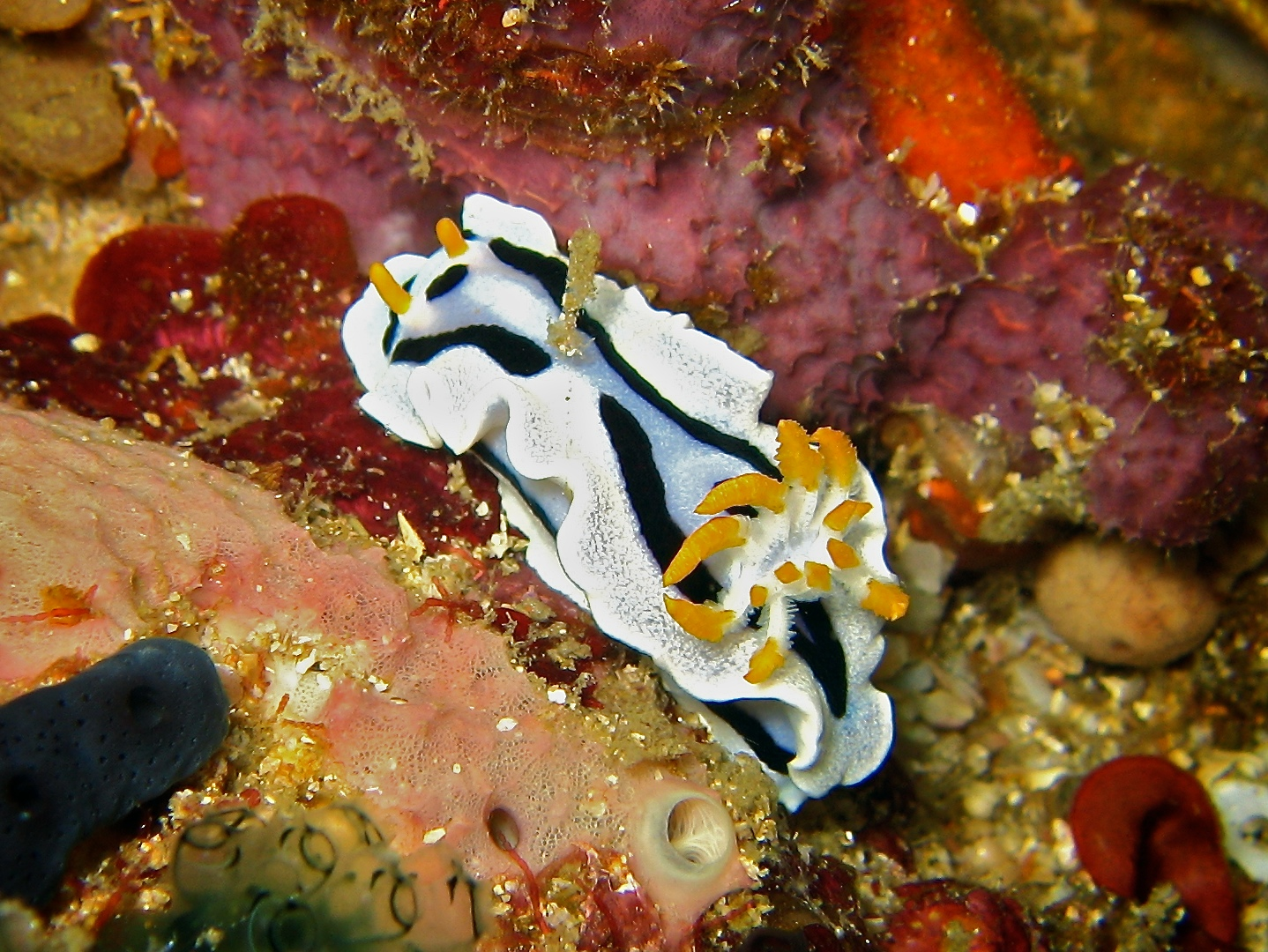
Chromodoris alcalai

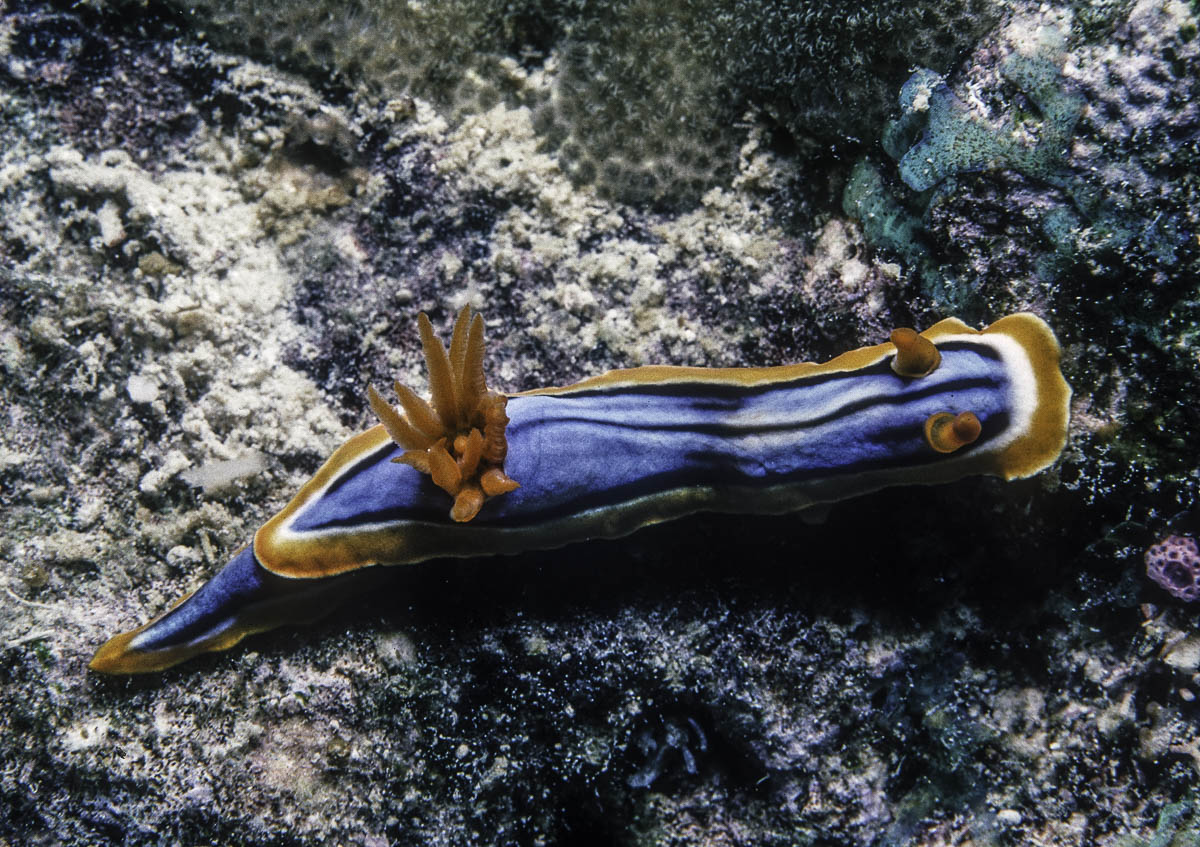
Chromodoris hamiltoni

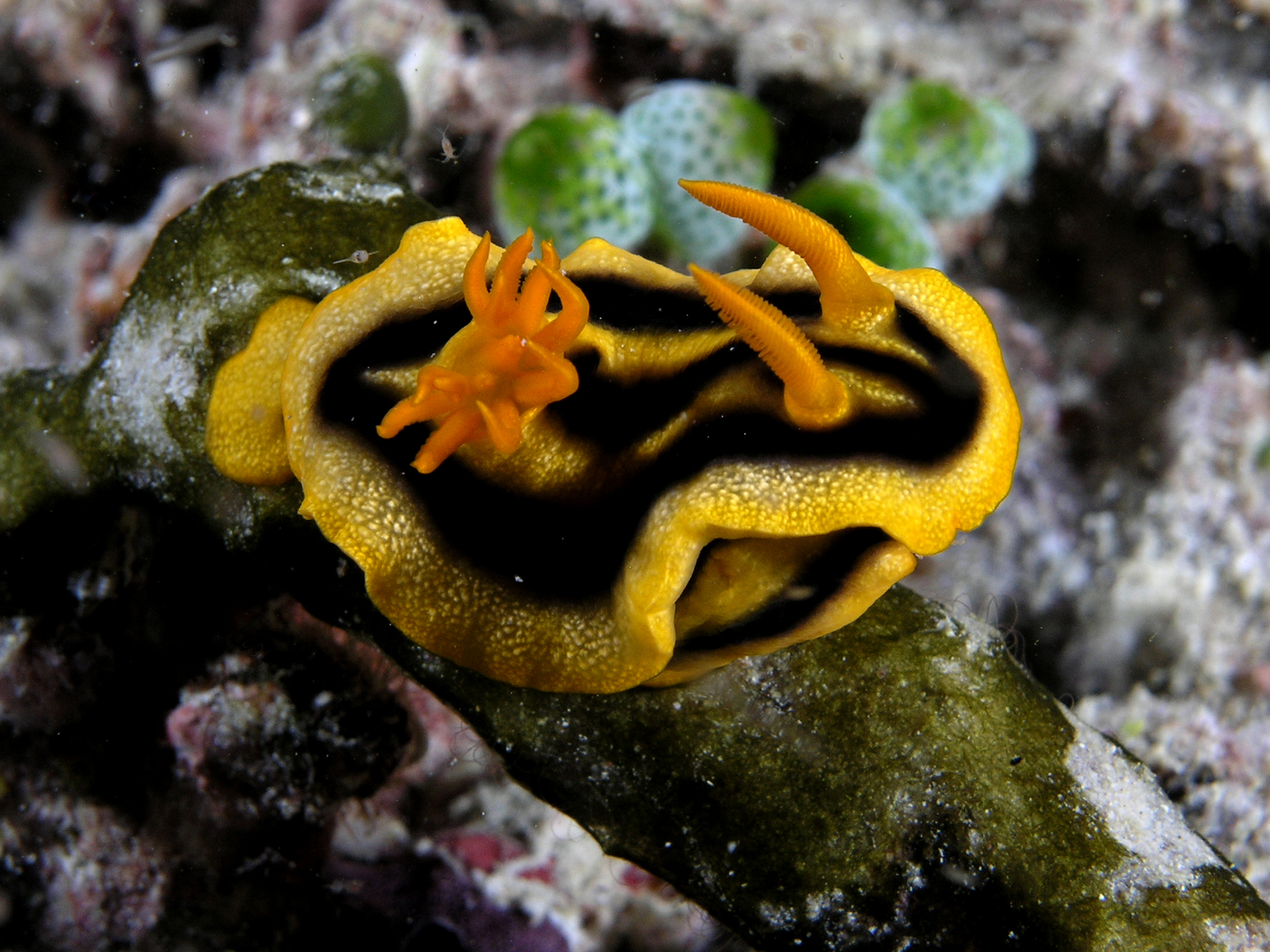
Chromodoris joshi

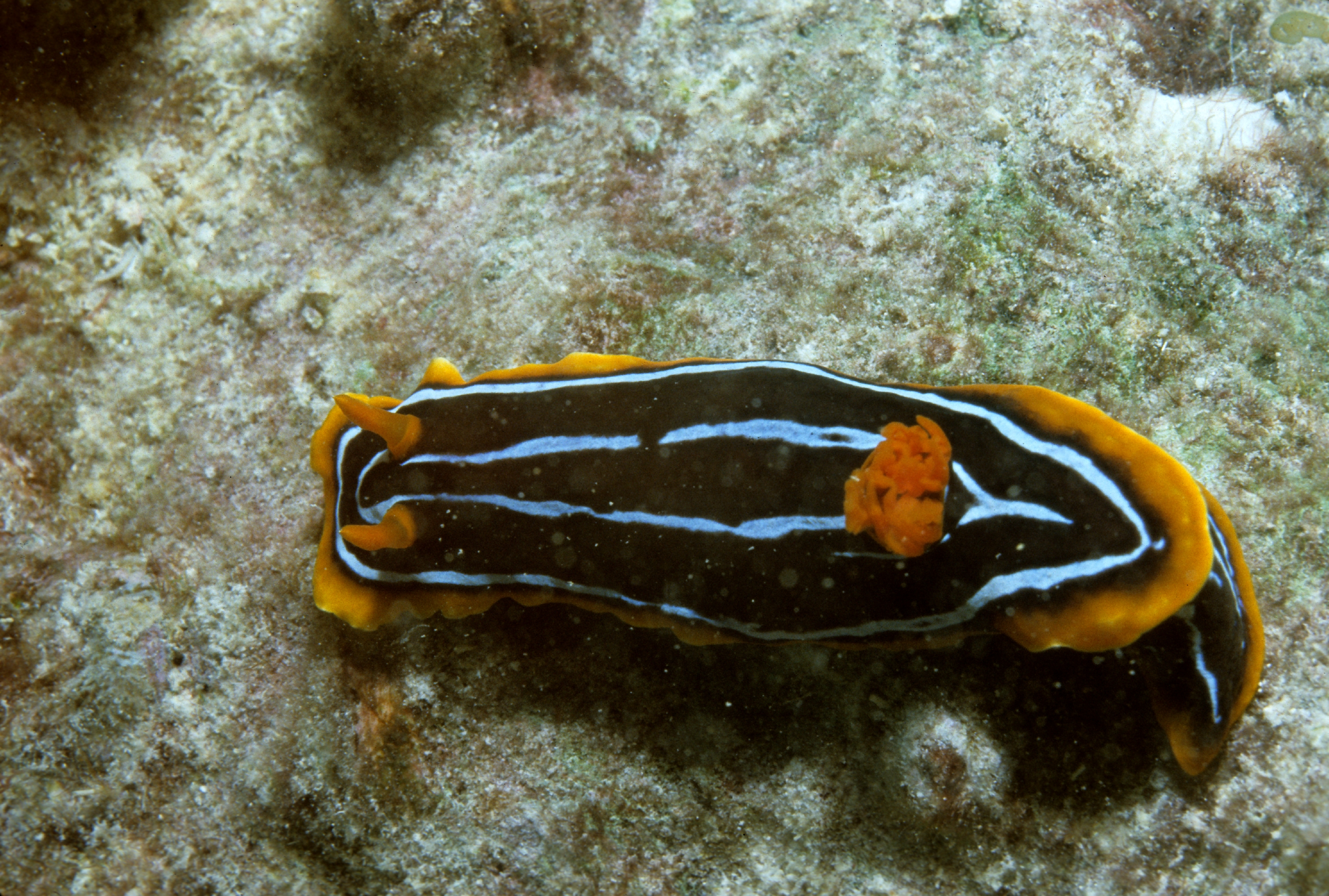
Chromodoris kuiteri

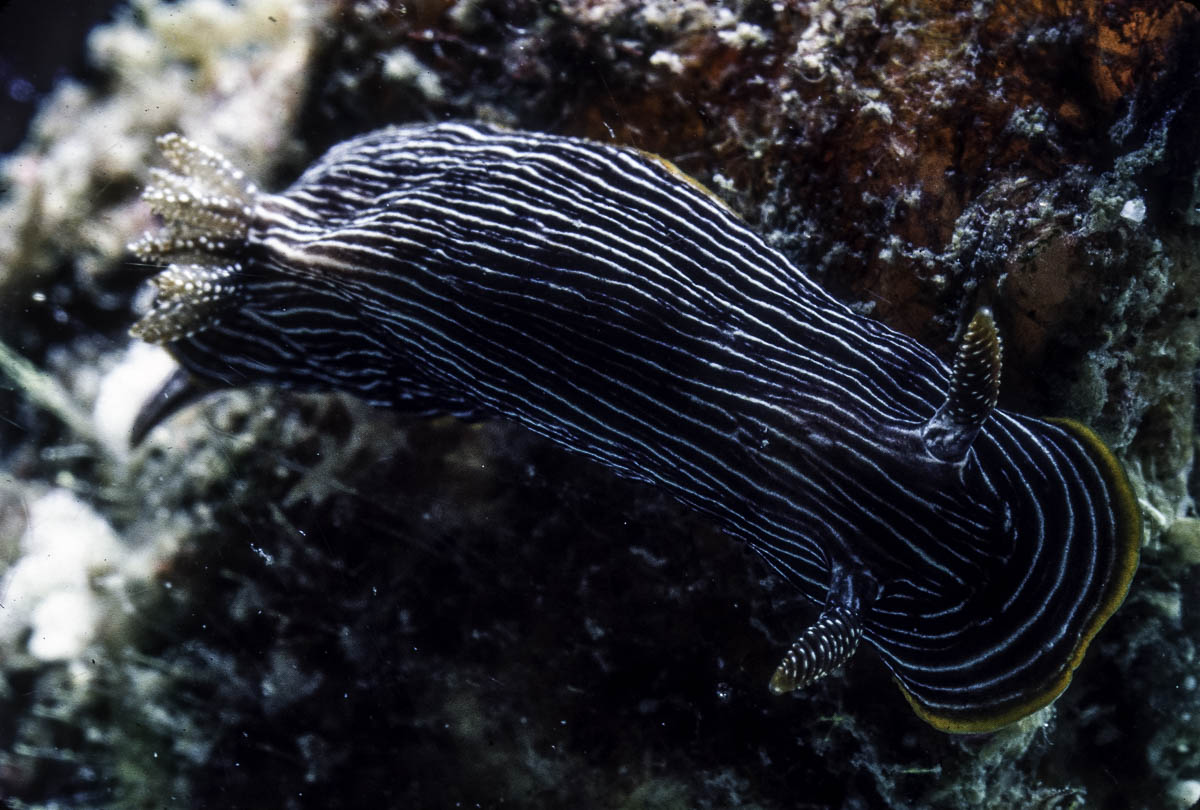
Chromodoris lineolata

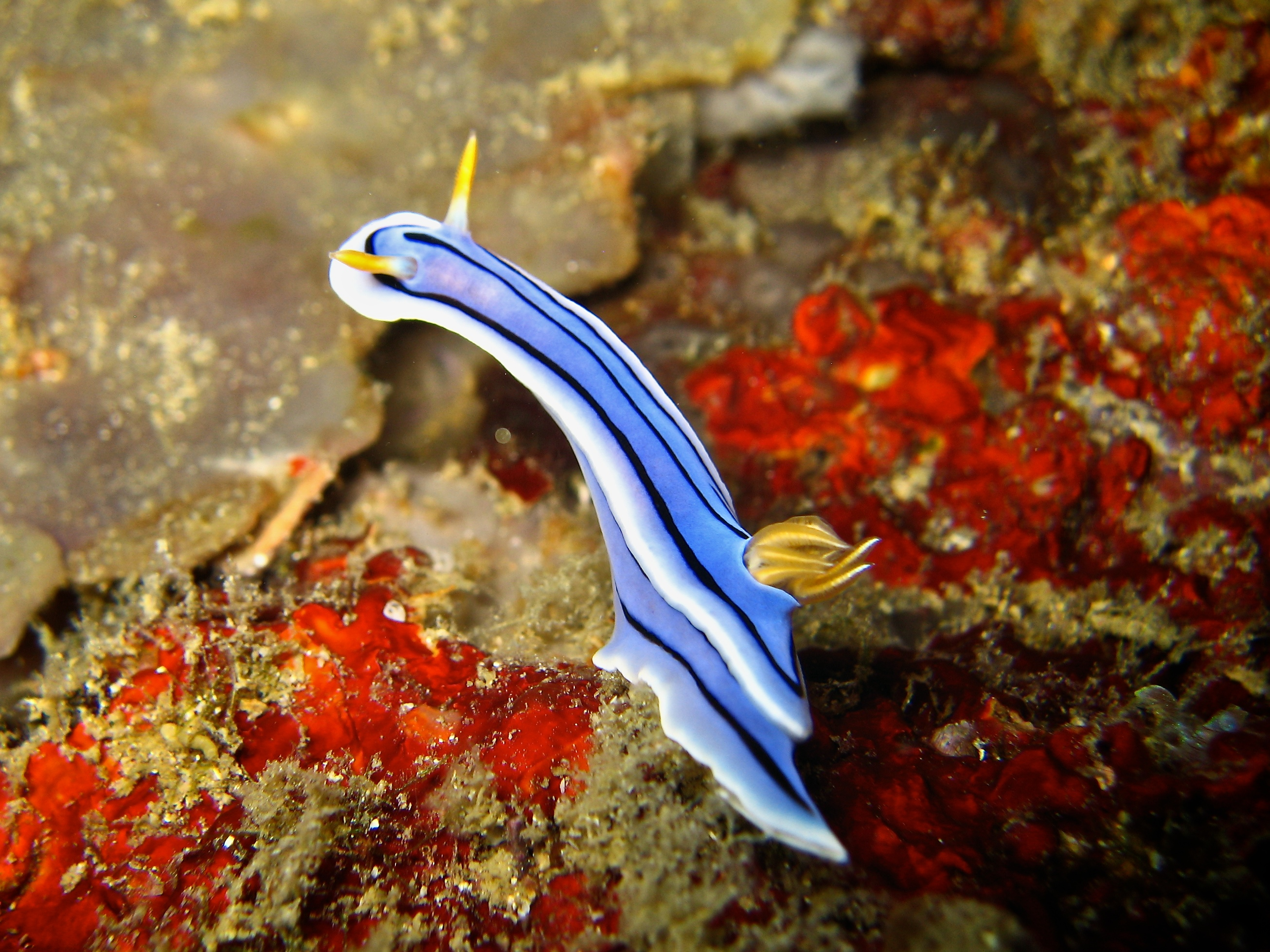
Chromodoris lochi

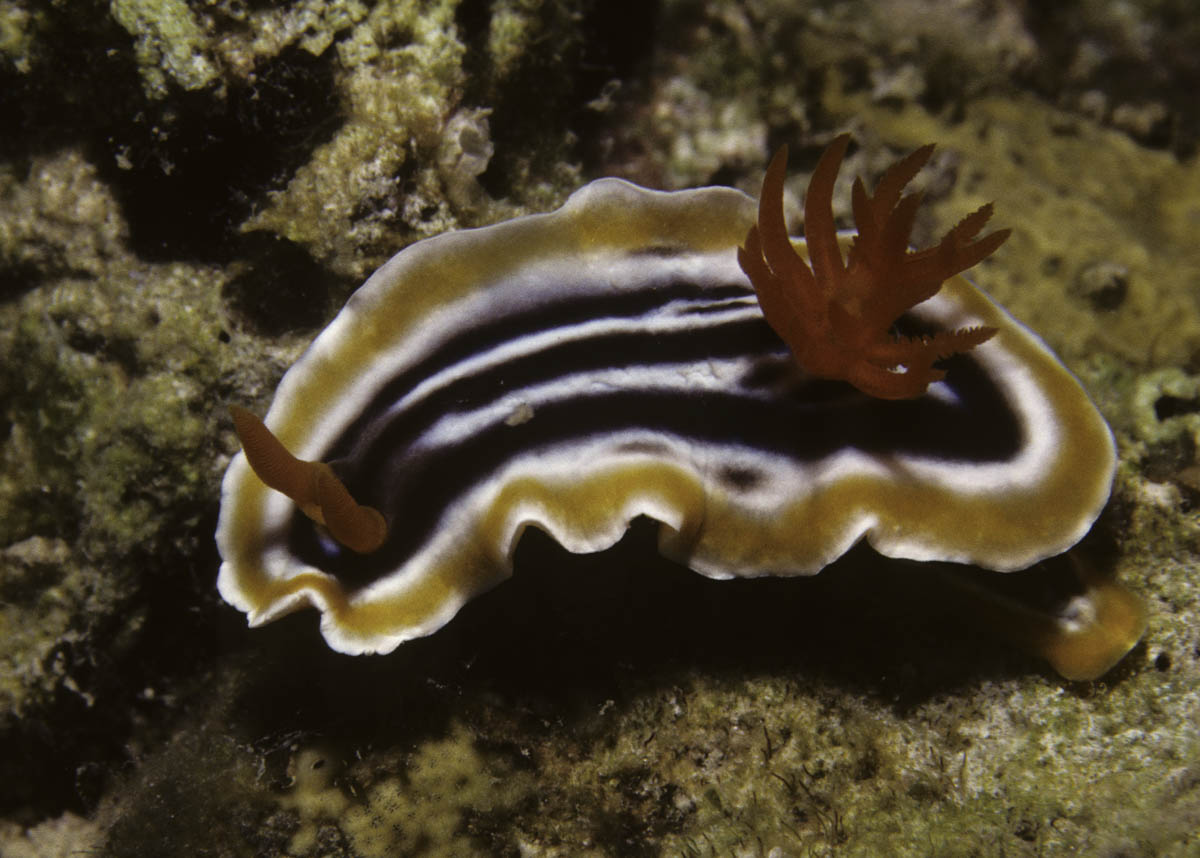
Chromodoris magnifica

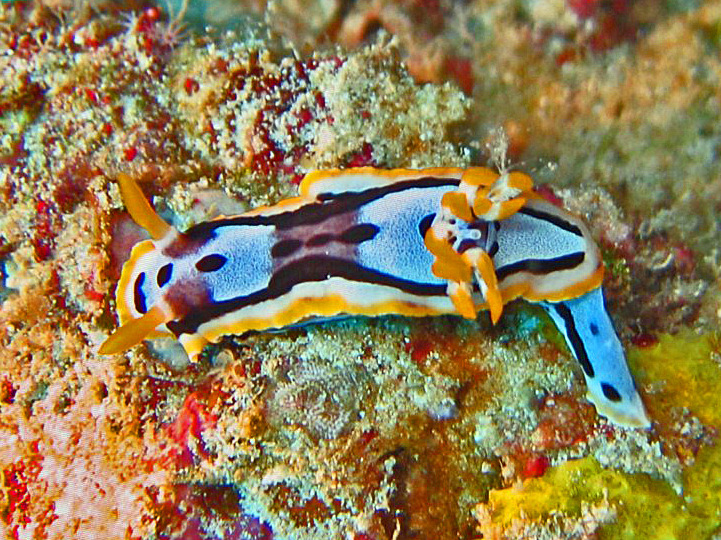
Chromodoris michaeli

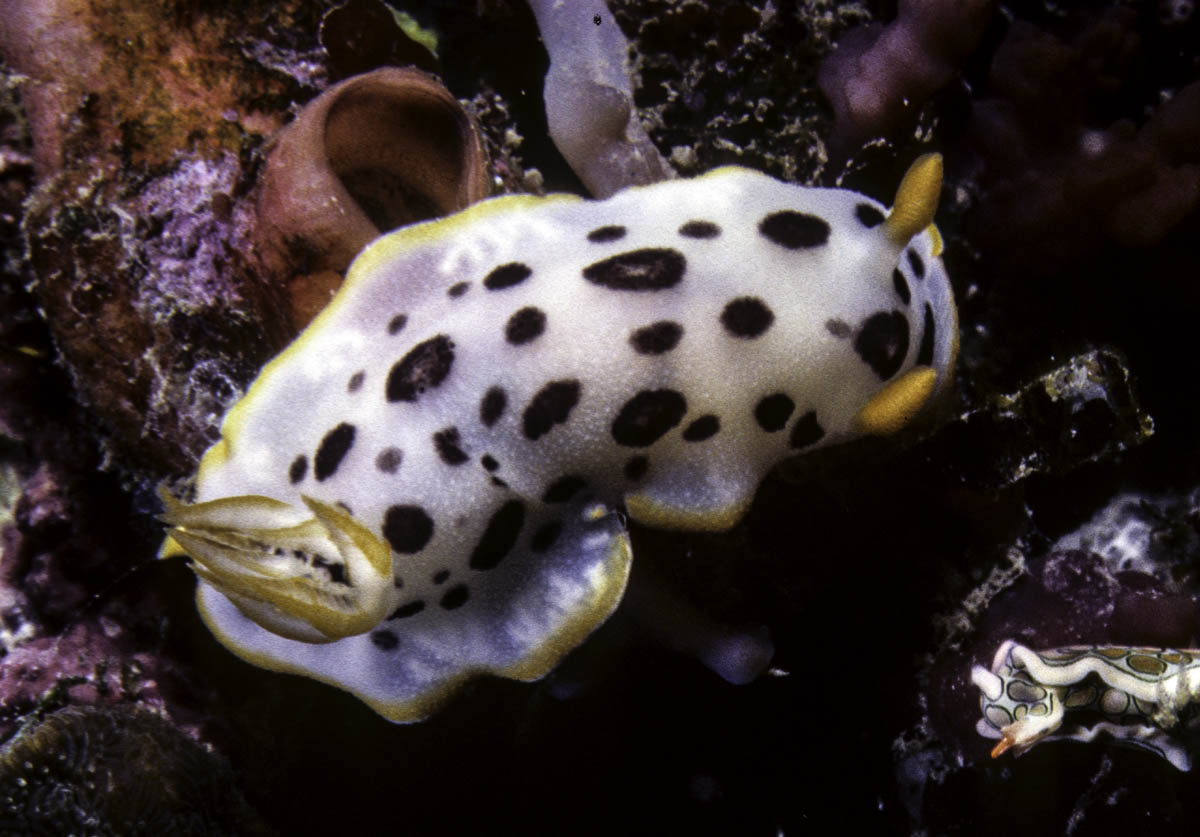
Chromodoris orientalis

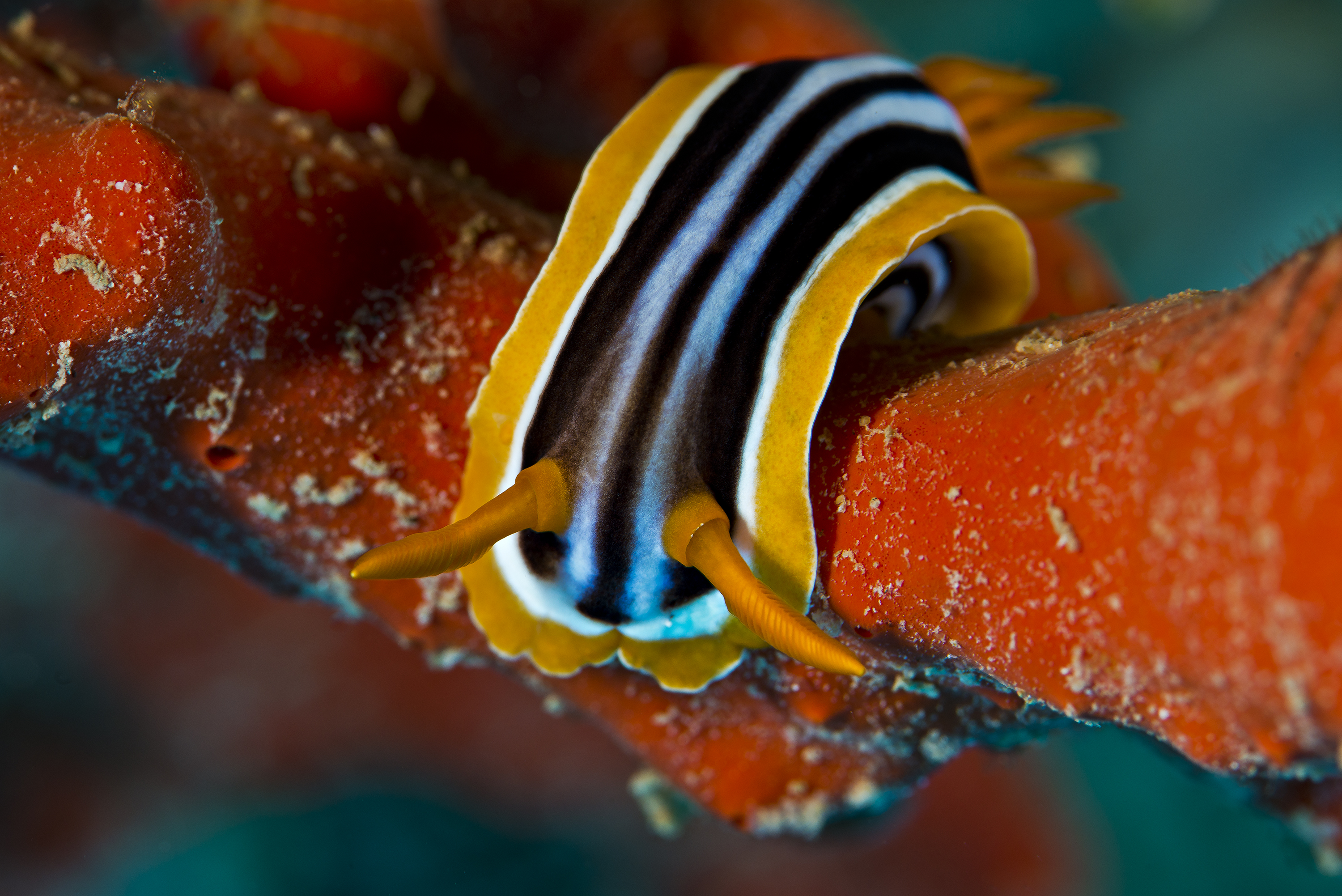
Chromodoris quadricolor

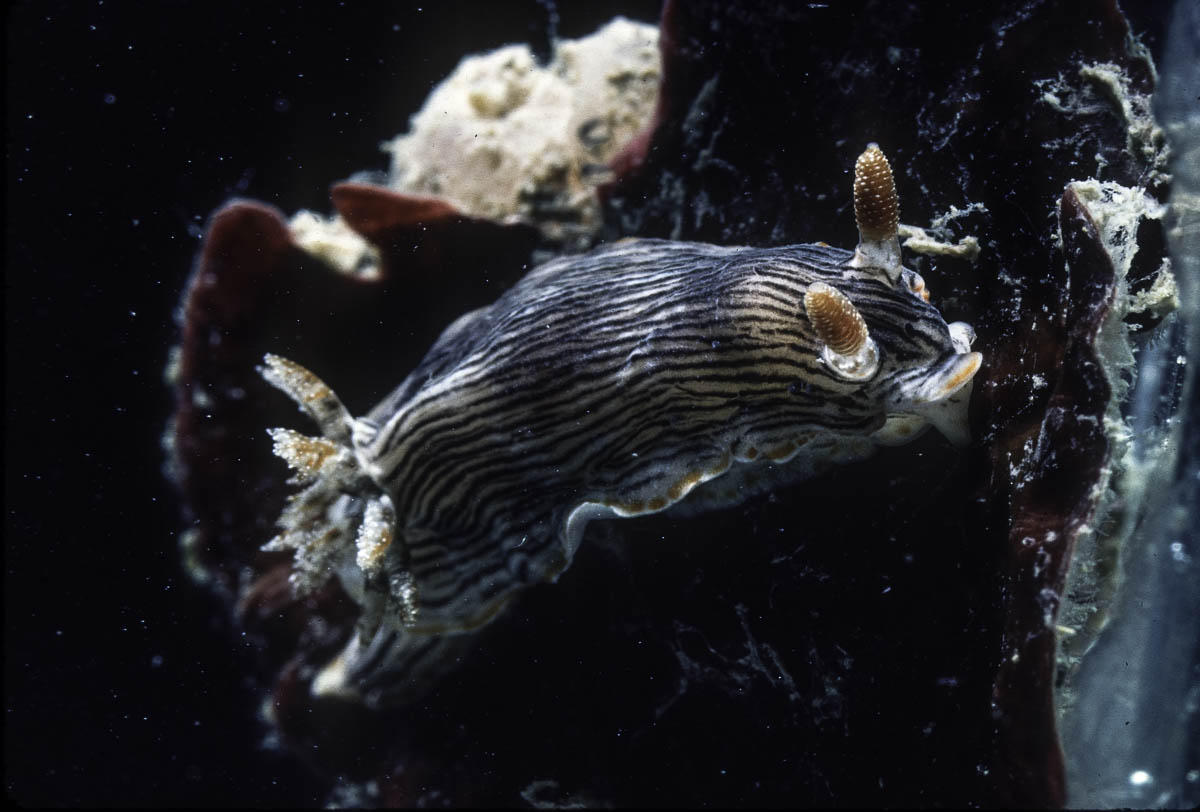
Chromodoris striatella

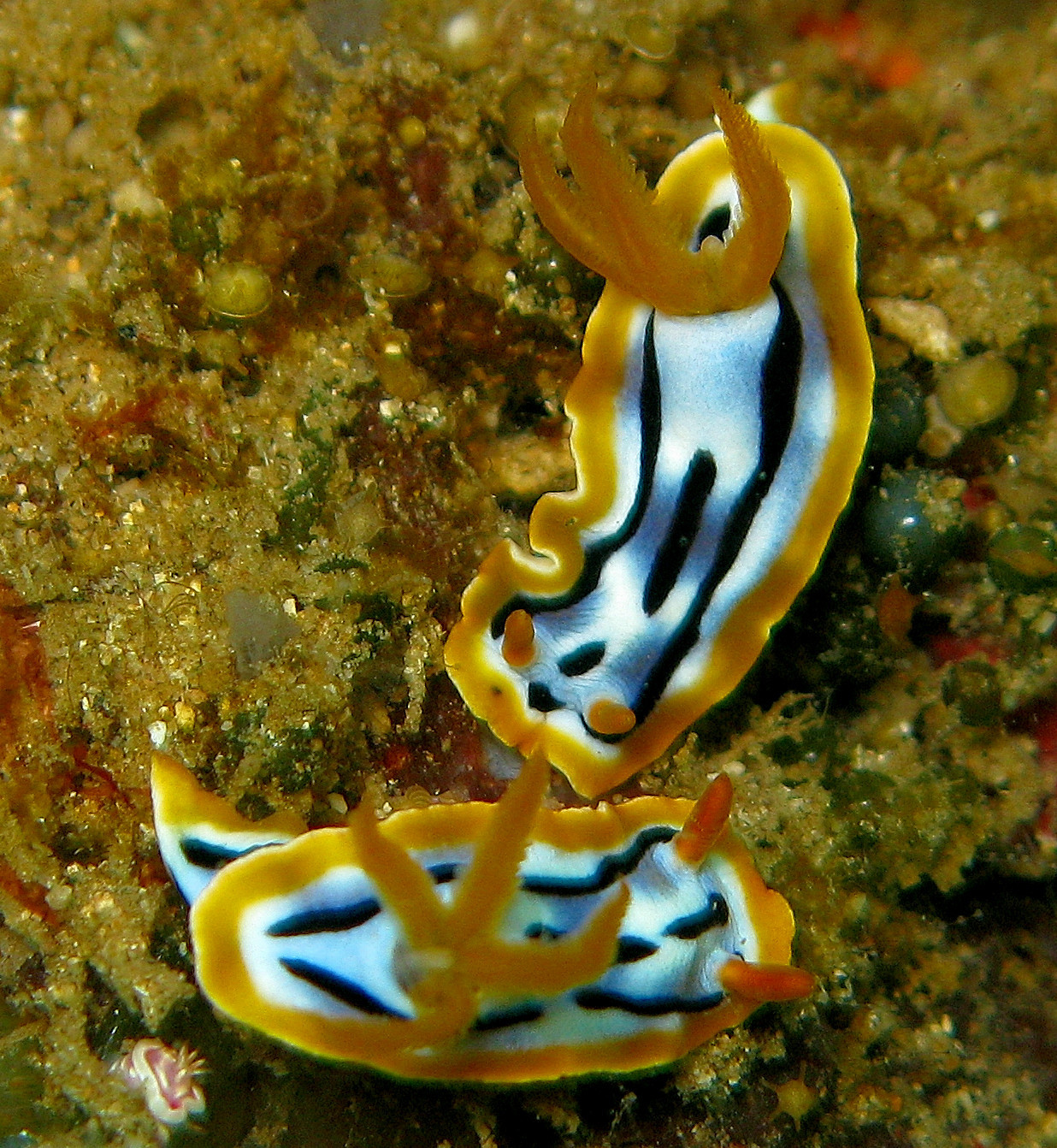
Chromodoris strigata

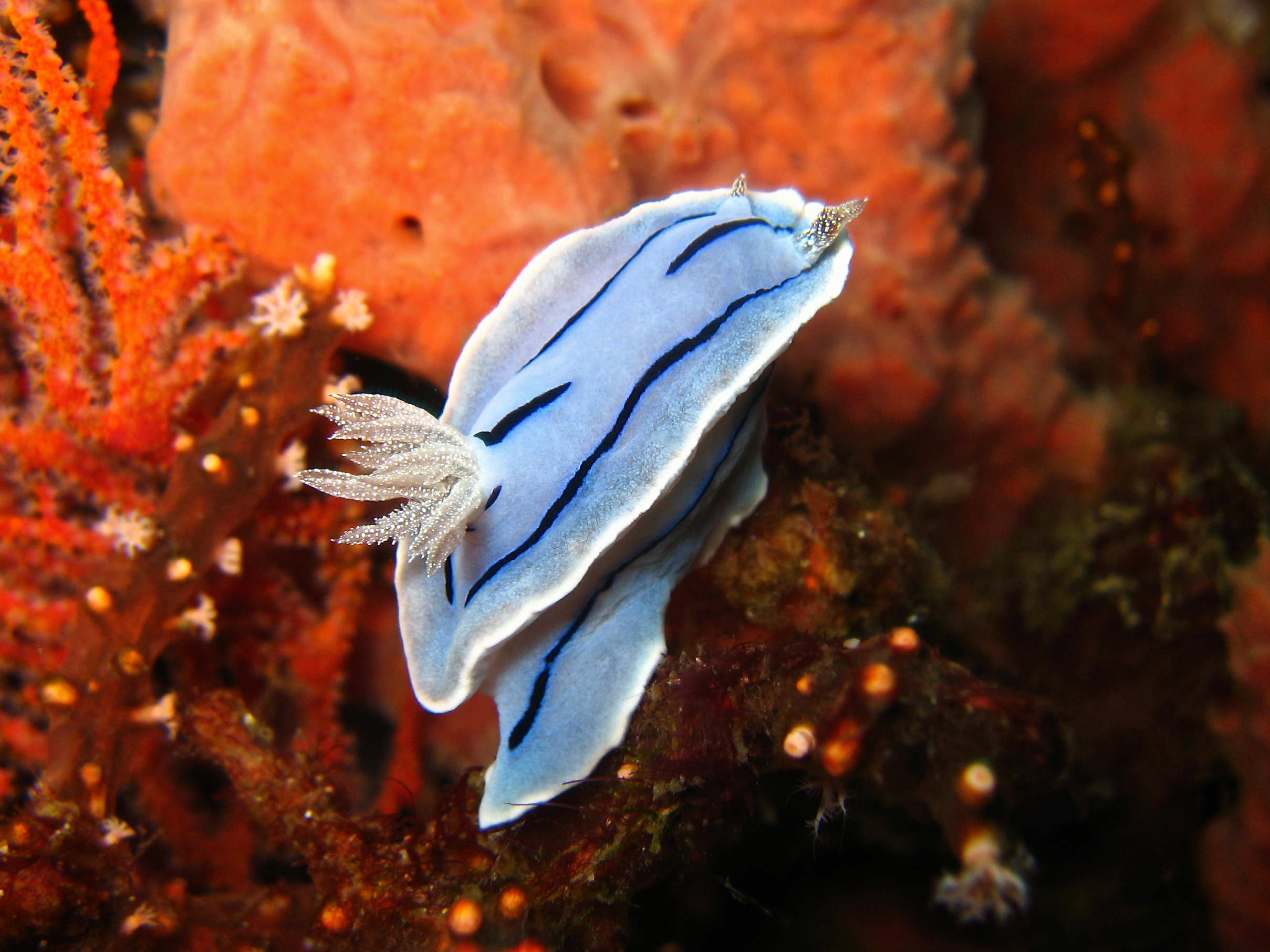
Chromodoris willani

Synonyms

- Chromodoris aegialia Berghm 1904: synonym of Felimare agassizii Bergh, 1894
- Chromodoris agassizii Bergh, 1894: synonym of Felimare agassizii
- Chromodoris alba van Hasselt, 1824 sensu Orr, 1980: synonym of Verconia nivalis Baba, 1937
- Chromodoris albolineata Berghm 1879: synonym of Chromodoris lineolata van Hasselt, 1824
- Chromodoris albonares Rudman, 1990: synonym of Goniobranchus albonares
- Chromodoris albopunctata Garrett, 1879: synonym of Goniobranchus albopunctatus Garrett, 1879
- Chromodoris albopustulosa Pease, 1860: synonym of Goniobranchus albopustulosus Pease, 1860
- Chromodoris alderi Collingwood, 1881: synonym of Goniobranchus alderi
- Chromodoris alius Rudman, 1987: synonym of Goniobranchus alius
- Chromodoris amoena Cheeseman, 1886: synonym of Ceratosoma amoenum Cheeseman, 1886
- Chromodoris annulata Eliot, 1904: synonym of Goniobranchus annulatus Eliot, 1904
- Chromodoris antonii Bertsch, 1976: synonym of Mexichromis antonii
- Chromodoris atopa Bergh, 1905: synonym of Ceratosoma amoenum Cheeseman, 1886
- Chromodoris aureomarginata Cheeseman, 1881: synonym of Goniobranchus aureomarginatus Cheeseman, 1881
- Chromodoris aureopurpurea Collingwood, 1881: synonym of Goniobranchus aureopurpureus Collingwood, 1881
- Chromodoris aurigera Rudman, 1990: synonym of Goniobranchus aurigerus
- Chromodoris australis Risbec, 1928: synonym of Thorunna australis
- Chromodoris banksi Farmer, 1963: synonym of Glossodoris dalli Bergh, 1879
- Chromodoris baumanni Bertsch, 1970: synonym of Glossodoris baumanni
- Chromodoris bennetti Angas, 1864: synonym of Hypselodoris bennetti
- Chromodoris bimaensis Bergh, 1905: synonym Goniobranchus bimaensis
- Chromodoris binza Ev. Marcus & Er. Marcus, 1963: synonym of Felimida binza
- Chromodoris boucheti Rudman, 1982: synonym of Chromodoris lochi Rudman, 1982
- Chromodoris britoi Ortea & Pérez, 1983: synonym of Felimida binza Ev. Marcus & Er. Marcus, 1963
- Chromodoris bullocki Collingwood, 1881: synonym of Hypselodoris bullocki
- Chromodoris californiensis Bergh, 1879: synonym of Felimare californiensis
- Chromodoris cantrainii Bergh, 1879: synonym of Felimare picta R. A. Philippi, 1836
- Chromodoris carnea Bergh, 1889: synonym of Hypselodoris carnea
- Chromodoris cavae Eliot, 1904: synonym of Goniobranchus cavae
- Chromodoris cazae Gosliner & Behrens, 2004: synonym of Goniobranchus cazae
- Chromodoris charlottae Schrödl, 1999: synonym of Goniobranchus charlottae
- Chromodoris clavata Risbec, 1928: synonym of Chromodoris striatella Bergh, 1877
- Chromodoris clenchi Russell, 1935: synonym of Felimida clenchi
- Chromodoris clitonota Bergh, 1905: synonym of Mexichromis lemniscata Quoy & Gaimard, 1832
- Chromodoris coerulea Risso, 1818: synonym of Felimare villafranca Risso, 1818
- Chromodoris coi Risbec, 1956: synonym of Goniobranchus coi
- Chromodoris collingwoodi Rudman, 1987: synonym of Goniobranchus collingwoodi
- Chromodoris conchyliata Yonow, 1984: synonym of Goniobranchus conchyliatus
- Chromodoris corimbae Ortea, Gofas & Á. Valdés, 1998: synonym of Felimida corimbae
- Chromodoris crossei Angas, 1864: synonym of Hypselodoris obscura W. Stimpson, 1855
- Chromodoris dalli Bergh, 1879: synonym of Glossodoris dalli
- Chromodoris daphne Angas, 1864: synonym of Goniobranchus daphne
- Chromodoris decora Pease, 1860: synonym of Goniobranchus decorus
- Chromodoris diardi Kelaart, 1859: synonym of Hypselodoris infucata Rüppell & Leuckart, 1830
- Chromodoris elegans Cantraine, 1835: synonym of Felimare picta R. A. Philippi, 1836
- Chromodoris elegantula Philippi, 1844: synonym of Felimida elegantula
- Chromodoris epicuria Basedow & Hedley, 1905: synonym of Goniobranchus epicurius
- Chromodoris faeyeae Lance, 1968: synonym of Chromolaichma sedna Ev. Marcus & Er. Marcus, 1967
- Chromodoris fentoni Valdés, Gatdula, Sheridan & Herrera, 2011: synonym of Rudmania fentoni
- Chromodoris festiva Angas, 1864: synonym of Mexichromis festiva
- Chromodoris festiva A. Adams, 1861: synonym of Hypselodoris festiva A. Adams, 1861
- Chromodoris fidelis Kelaart, 1858: synonym of Goniobranchus fidelis
- Chromodoris figurata Cheeseman, 1886: synonym of Ceratosoma amoenum Cheeseman, 1886
- Chromodoris flammulata Bergh, 1905: synonym of Goniobranchus fidelis Kelaart, 1858
- Chromodoris flava Eliot, 1904: synonym of Diversidoris flava
- Chromodoris francoisae Bouchet, 1981: synonym of Neptunazurea francoisae
- Chromodoris funerea Collingwood, 1881: synonym of Chromodoris lineolata van Hasselt, 1824
- Chromodoris galactos Rudman & Johnson in Rudman, 1985: synonym of Goniobranchus galactos
- Chromodoris galexorum Bertsch, 1978: synonym of Felimida galexorum
- Chromodoris geminus Rudman, 1987: synonym of Goniobranchus geminus
- Chromodoris geometrica Risbec, 1928: synonym of Goniobranchus geometricus
- Chromodoris ghardagana [sic]: synonym of Hypselodoris ghardaqana Gohar & Aboul-Ela, 1957
- Chromodoris glauca Bergh, 1879: synonym of Felimare californiensis Bergh, 1879
- Chromodoris gleniei Kelaart, 1858: synonym of Goniobranchus gleniei
- Chromodoris gloriosa Bergh, 1874: synonym of Verconia varians Pease, 1871
- Chromodoris godeffroyana Bergh, 1877: synonym of Hypselodoris godeffroyana
- Chromodoris goslineri Ortea & Valdés in Ortea, Valdés & Garcia Gómez, 1996: synonym of Felimida goslineri
- Chromodoris grahami Thompson, 1980: synonym of Rudmania grahami
- Chromodoris heatherae & Behrens, 1994: synonym of Goniobranchus heatherae
- Chromodoris hintuanensis Gosliner & Behrens, 1998: synonym of Goniobranchus hintuanensis
- Chromodoris histrio Bergh, 1877: synonym of Goniobranchus rufomaculatus Pease, 1871
- Chromodoris hunterae Rudman, 1983: synonym of Goniobranchus hunterae
- Chromodoris hunteri [sic] Rudman, 1983: synonym of Goniobranchus hunterae
- Chromodoris iheringi Bergh, 1879: synonym of Felimida luteorosea Rapp, 1827
- Chromodoris imperialis Pease, 1860: synonym of Hypselodoris imperialis
- Chromodoris inornata Pease, 1871: synonym of Chromodoris aspersa A. A. Gould, 1852
- Chromodoris juvenca Bergh, 1898: synonym of Tyrinna delicata Abraham, 1877
- Chromodoris kempfi Ev. Marcus, 1971: synonym of Neptunazurea kempfi
- Chromodoris kitae Gosliner, 1994: synonym of Goniobranchus kitae
- Chromodoris kpone Edmunds, 1981: synonym of Felimida kpone
- Chromodoris krishna Rudman, 1973: synonym of Goniobranchus fidelis Kelaart, 1858
- Chromodoris krohni Vérany, 1846: synonym of Rudmania krohni
- Chromodoris kuniei Pruvot-Fol, 1930: synonym of Goniobranchus kuniei
- Chromodoris lactea Bergh, 1905: synonym of Goniobranchus fidelis Kelaart, 1858
- Chromodoris lamberti Crosse, 1875: synonym of Glossodoris lamberti
- Chromodoris lekker Gosliner, 1994: synonym of Goniobranchus lekker
- Chromodoris leopardusRudman, 1987: synonym of Goniobranchus leopardus
- Chromodoris lilacina Gould, 1852: synonym of Tayuva lilacina
- Chromodoris lineata Souleyet, 1852 : synonym of Hypselodoris maridadilus Rudman, 1977
- Chromodoris lineolata Bergh, 1874: synonym of Chromodoris striatella Bergh, 1877
- Chromodoris loringi Angas, 1864: synonym of Goniobranchus loringi
- Chromodoris luteopunctata Gantes, 1962: synonym of Felimida luteopunctata
- Chromodoris luteorosea Rapp, 1827: synonym of Felimida luteorosea
- Chromodoris luxuriosa Bergh, 1875: synonym of Mexichromis lemniscata Quoy & Gaimard, 1832
- Chromodoris macfarlandi Cockerell, 1901: synonym of Felimida macfarlandi
- Chromodoris maculosa Pease, 1871: synonym of Hypselodoris maculosa
- Chromodoris marenzelleri Bergh, 1888: synonym of Hypselodoris festiva A. Adams, 1861
- Chromodoris marginata Pease, 1860: synonym of Goniobranchus verrieri Crosse, 1875
- Chromodoris mariei Crosse, 1872: synonym of Mexichromis mariei
- Chromodoris marislae Bertsch, 1973: synonym of Felimida marislae
- Chromodoris maritima Baba, 1949: synonym of Hypselodoris maritima
- Chromodoris messinensis Ihering, 1880: synonym of Felimare villafranca Risso, 1818
- Chromodoris moerchii Bergh, 1879: synonym of Glossodoris moerchi
- Chromodoris mouaci Risbec, 1930: synonym of Hypselodoris whitei A. Adams & Reeve, 1850
- Chromodoris multimaculosa Rudman, 1987: synonym of Goniobranchus multimaculosus
- Chromodoris naiki Valdes, Mollo, & Ortea, 1999: synonym of Goniobranchus bombayanus Winckworth, 1946
- Chromodoris ndukuei Risbec, 1928: synonym of Goniobranchus decorus Pease, 1860
- Chromodoris neona Er. Marcus, 1955: synonym of Felimida clenchi H. D. Russell, 1935
- Chromodoris nigrostriata Eliot, 1904: synonym of Hypselodoris nigrostriata
- Chromodoris norrisi Farmer, 1963: synonym of Felimida norrisi
- Chromodoris nyalya Ev. Marcus & Er. Marcus, 1967: synonym of Felimare nyalya
- Chromodoris obsoleta Rüppell & Leuckart, 1831: synonym of Goniobranchus obsoletus
- Chromodoris odhneri Risbec, 1953: synonym of Hypselodoris tryoni Garrett, 1873
- Chromodoris orsiniiVérany, 1846: synonym of Felimare orsinii
- Chromodoris pallescens Bergh, 1875: synonym of Chromodoris aspersa A. A. Gould, 1852
- Chromodoris pallida Rüppell & Leuckart, 1830: synonym of Goniobranchus pallida
- Chromodoris pantherina Bergh, 1905: synonym of Glossodoris pantherina
- Chromodoris paulomarcioi Dominguez, Garcia & Troncoso, 2006: synonym of Rudmania grahami T. E. Thompson, 1980
- Chromodoris peasei Bergh, 1880: synonym of Hypselodoris peasei
- Chromodoris perplexa Burn, 1957: synonym of Thorunna perplexa
- Chromodoris petechialis Gould, 1852: synonym of Goniobranchus petechialis
- Chromodoris placida Baba, 1949: synonym of Hypselodoris placida
- Chromodoris ponga Er. Marcus & Ev. Marcus, 1970: synonym of Felimida ponga
- Chromodoris porterae T. D. A. Cockerell, 1901: synonym of Neptunazurea porterae
- Chromodoris preciosa Kelaart, 1858: synonym of Goniobranchus preciosus
- Chromodoris pulchella Rüppell & Leuckart, 1830: synonym of Hypselodoris pulchella
- Chromodoris punctilucens Bergh, 1890: synonym of Felimida punctilucens
- Chromodoris purpurea Risso, 1831: synonym of Rudmania purpurea
- Chromodoris pusilla Bergh, 1874: synonym of Mexichromis pusilla
- Chromodoris regalis Ortea, Caballer & Moro, 2001: synonym of Felimida regalis
- Chromodoris reticulata Quoy & Gaimard, 1832: synonym of Goniobranchus reticulatus
- Chromodoris roboi Gosliner & Behrens, 1998: synonym of Goniobranchus roboi
- Chromodoris rodomaculata Ortea & Valdés, 1991: synonym of Felimida luteopunctata Gantès, 1962
- Chromodoris rolani Ortea, 1988: synonym of Felimida rolani
- Chromodoris rosans Bergh, 1889: synonym of Hypselodoris rosans
- Chromodoris roseopicta A. E. Verrill, 1900: synonym of Felimare zebra Heilprin, 1889
- Chromodoris rubrocornuta Rudman, 1985: synonym of Goniobranchus rubrocornutus
- Chromodoris rufomaculata Pease, 1871: synonym of Goniobranchus rufomaculatus
- Chromodoris rufomarginata Bergh, 1890: synonym of Glossodoris rufomarginata
- Chromodoris runcinata Bergh, 1877: synonym of Hypselodoris infucata Rüppell & Leuckart, 1831
- Chromodoris ruzafai Ortea, Bacallado, & Valdes, 1992: synonym of Felimida ruzafai
- Chromodoris sannio Bergh, 1890: synonym of Mexichromis mariei Crosse, 1872
- Chromodoris scabriuscula Bergh, 1890: synonym of Cadlina scabriuscula
- Chromodoris scurra Bergh, 1874: synonym of Mexichromis lemniscata Quoy & Gaimard, 1832
- Chromodoris sedna Ev. Marcus & Er. Marcus, 1967: synonym of Chromolaichma sedna
- Chromodoris semperi Bergh, 1877: synonym of Hypselodoris nigrostriata Rüppell & Leuckart, 1830
- Chromodoris setoensis Baba, 1938: synonym of Goniobranchus setoensis
- Chromodoris shirarae Baba, 1953: synonym of Goniobranchus tumuliferus Collingwood, 1881
- Chromodoris sibogae Bergh, 1905: synonym of Doriprismatica sibogae
- Chromodoris simplex Pease, 1871: synonym of Verconia simplex
- Chromodoris sinensis Rudman, 1985: synonym of Goniobranchus sinensis
- Chromodoris socorroensis Behrens, Gosliner & Hermosillo, 2009: synonym of Felimida socorroensis
- Chromodoris sonora Ev. Marcus & Er. Marcus, 1967: synonym of Chromolaichma dalli Bergh, 1879
- Chromodoris sphoni Ev. Marcus, 1971: synonym of Felimida sphoni
- Chromodoris splendida Angas, 1864: synonym of Goniobranchus splendidus
- Chromodoris sycilla Bergh, 1890: synonym of Felimare sycilla
- Chromodoris sykesi Eliot, 1904: synonym of Goniobranchus albopunctatus Garrett, 1879
- Chromodoris tasmaniensis Bergh, 1905: synonym of Goniobranchus tasmaniensis
- Chromodoris tennentana Kelaart, 1859: synonym of Goniobranchus tennentanus
- Chromodoris thalassopora Bergh, 1879: synonym of Glossodoris thalassopora
- Chromodoris thompsoni Rudman, 1983: synonym of Goniobranchus thompsoni
- Chromodoris tinctoria Rüppell & Leuckart, 1830: synonym of Goniobranchus tinctorius
- Chromodoris tricolor Cantraine: synonym of Felimare tricolor
- Chromodoris trilineata Ihering, 1880: synonym of Rudmania krohni Vérany, 1846
- Chromodoris trimarginata Winckworth, 1946: synonym of Goniobranchus trimarginatus
- Chromodoris tritos Yonow, 1994: synonym of Goniobranchus tritos
- Chromodoris tryoni Garrett, 1873: synonym of Hypselodoris tryoni
- Chromodoris tumulifera Collingwood, 1881: synonym of Goniobranchus tumuliferus
- Chromodoris tura Ev. Marcus & Er. Marcus, 1967: synonym of Mexichromis tura
- Chromodoris universitatis T. D. A. Cockerell, 1901: synonym of Felimare californiensis Bergh, 1879
- Chromodoris valenciennesi Cantraine, 1841: synonym of Felimare picta R. A. Philippi, 1836
- Chromodoris varians Pease, 1871: synonym of Verconia varians
- Chromodoris verrieri Crosse, 1875: synonym of Goniobranchus verrieri
- Chromodoris versicolor Risbec, 1928: synonym of Hypselodoris versicolor
- Chromodoris vibrata Pease, 1860: synonym of Goniobranchus vibratus
- Chromodoris vicina Eliot, 1904: synonym of Goniobranchus tennentanus Kelaart, 1859
- Chromodoris victoriae Burn, 1957: synonym of Goniobranchus epicurius Basedow & Hedley, 1905
- Chromodoris villafranca: synonym of Felimare villafranca
- Chromodoris virgata Bergh, 1905: synonym of Mexichromis trilineata A. Adams & Reeve, 1850
- Chromodoris westralensis [sic]: synonym of Chromodoris westraliensis O'Donoghue, 1924
- Chromodoris woodwardae Rudman, 1983: synonym of Goniobranchus woodwardae
- Chromodoris youngbleuthi Kay & D. K. Young, 1969: synonym of Glossodoris rufomarginata Bergh, 1890
- Chromodoris zebra Heilprin, 1889: synonym of Felimare zebra
- Chromodoris zebrina Alder & Hancock, 1864: synonym of Hypselodoris zebrina

== Sources ==
- SEM images of the radula can be found at Thompson, T.E.; Bebbington, A. (1973). "Scanning electron microscope studies of gastropod radulae". Malacologia. 14: 147–165.
- Rudman W.B. (1977) Chromodorid opisthobranch Mollusca from East Africa and the tropical West Pacific. Zoological Journal of the Linnean Society 61: 351-397
- Rudman W.B. (1984) The Chromodorididae (Opisthobranchia: Mollusca) of the Indo-West Pacific: a review of the genera. Zoological Journal of the Linnean Society 81 (2/3): 115-273 page(s): 130
- Vaught, K.C. (1989). A classification of the living Mollusca. American Malacologists: Melbourne, FL (USA). ISBN 0-915826-22-4. XII, 195 pp.
- Rudman W.B. & Darvell B.W. (1990) Opisthobranch molluscs of Hong Kong: Part 1. Goniodorididae, Onchidorididae, Triophidae, Gymnodorididae, Chromodorididae (Nudibranchia). Asian Marine Biology 7: 31-79 page(s): 55
- Gofas, S.; Le Renard, J.; Bouchet, P. (2001). Mollusca, in: Costello, M.J. et al. (Ed.) (2001). European register of marine species: a check-list of the marine species in Europe and a bibliography of guides to their identification. Collection Patrimoines Naturels, 50: pp. 180–213
- Johnson R.F. & Gosliner T.M. (2012) Traditional taxonomic groupings mask evolutionary history: A molecular phylogeny and new classification of the chromodorid nudibranchs. PLoS ONE 7(4): e33479
