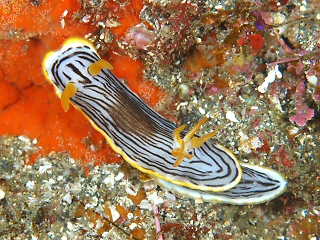

Scientific classification
- Kingdom: Animalia
- Phylum: Mollusca
- Class: Gastropoda
- Order: Nudibranchia
- Family: Chromodorididae
- Genus: Chromodoris
- Species: C. burni

Binomial name
- Chromodoris burni Rudman, 1982

= Chromodoris burni =

Species of gastropod

Chromodoris burni is a species of colourful sea slug, a dorid nudibranch, a marine gastropod mollusc in the family Chromodorididae.

== Distribution ==
This species was described from Centipede Reef, Townsville, Queensland, Australia. It has been found on a few occasions, and only from Queensland.

== Description ==
This species is similar in colouration to Chromodoris striatella but differs in having orange lines on the gills and orange rhinophore clubs whilst in C. striatella the gills and rhinophores are pale brown with fine white spots.
