= Chromodoris briqua =

Scientific classification
- Kingdom: Animalia
- Phylum: Mollusca
- Class: Gastropoda
- Order: Nudibranchia
- Family: Chromodorididae
- Genus: Chromodoris
- Species: C. briqua

Binomial name
- Chromodoris briqua Marcus, Er. & Burch, 1965

Species of gastropod

Chromodoris briqua is a species of colourful sea slug, a dorid nudibranch, a marine gastropod mollusc in the family Chromodorididae.

== Distribution ==
This species was described from Eniwetok Atoll, Marshall Islands.

== Description ==
Chromodoris briqua can reach a length of 30–50 mm. It may be a synonym of Hypselodoris whitei.
