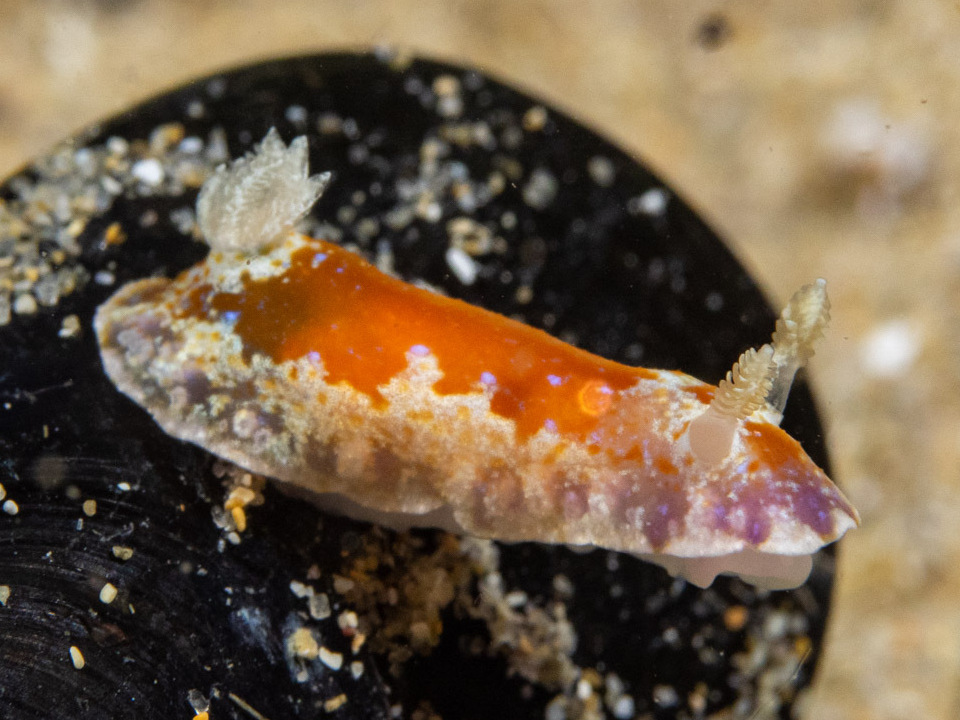

Scientific classification
- Kingdom: Animalia
- Phylum: Mollusca
- Class: Gastropoda
- Order: Nudibranchia
- Family: Chromodorididae
- Genus: Chromodoris
- Species: C. alternata

Binomial name
- Chromodoris alternata Burn, 1957

= Chromodoris alternata =

Species of gastropod

Chromodoris alternata is a species of colourful sea slug, a dorid nudibranch, a marine gastropod mollusc in the family Chromodorididae.

== Distribution ==
This chromodorid nudibranch is known only from Southern Australia.
