= Chromodoris perola =

Scientific classification
- Kingdom: Animalia
- Phylum: Mollusca
- Class: Gastropoda
- Order: Nudibranchia
- Family: Chromodorididae
- Genus: Chromodoris
- Species: C. perola

Binomial name
- Chromodoris perola Ev. Marcus, 1976

Species of gastropod

Chromodoris perola is a species of colourful sea slug, a dorid nudibranch, a marine gastropod mollusk in the family Chromodorididae.

== Distribution ==
This species was described from Colombia.

== Description ==
Chromodoris perola will probably be transferred to Felimida if it can be rediscovered. The maximum recorded body length is 11 mm.

== Habitat ==
Minimum recorded depth is 0.2 m. Maximum recorded depth is 3 m.
