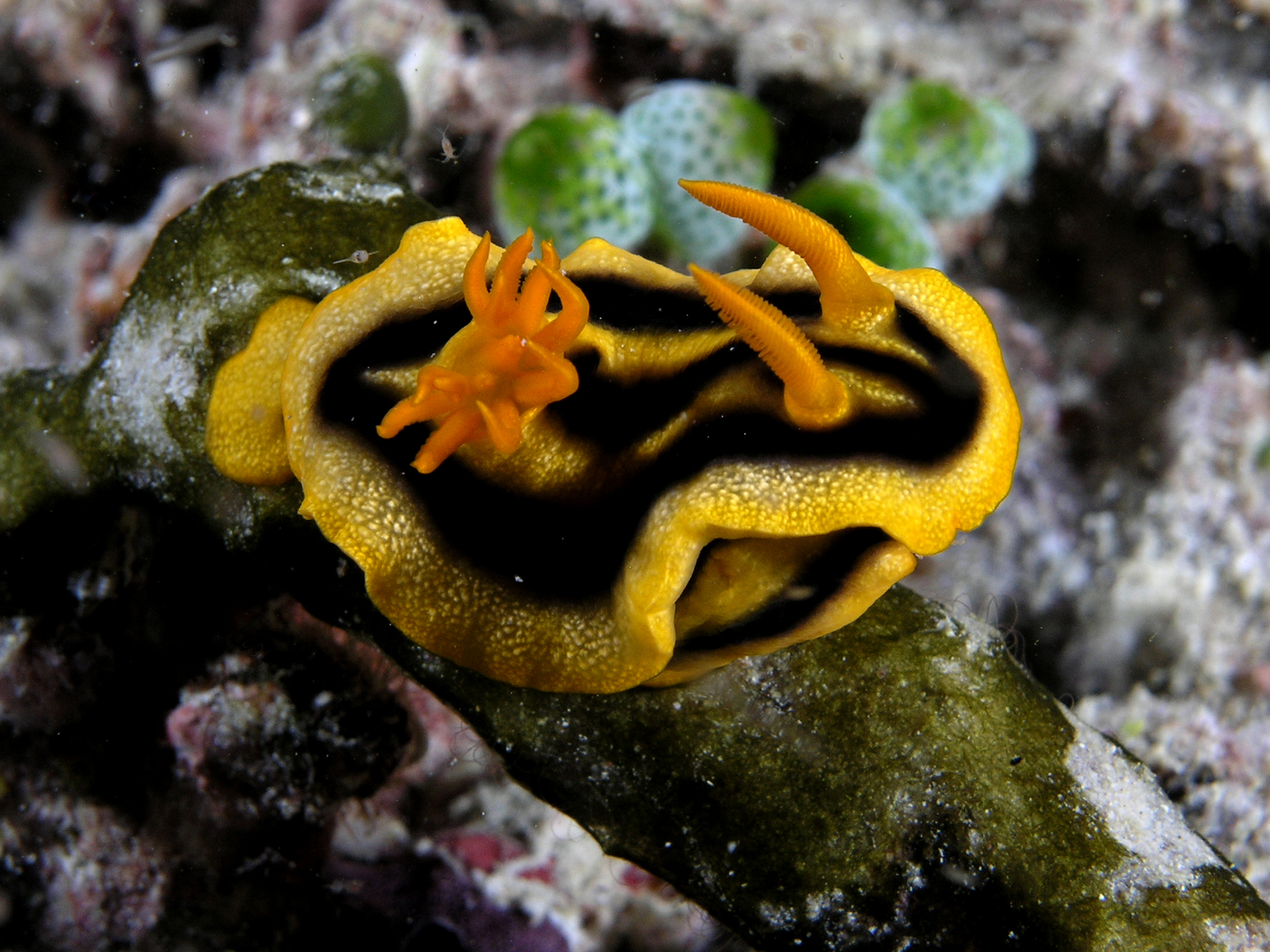
- Chromodoris joshi in the Komodo National Park

Scientific classification
- Kingdom: Animalia
- Phylum: Mollusca
- Class: Gastropoda
- Order: Nudibranchia
- Family: Chromodorididae
- Genus: Chromodoris
- Species: C. joshi

Binomial name
- Chromodoris joshi Gosliner & Behrens, 1998

= Chromodoris joshi =

Species of gastropod

Chromodoris joshi is a species of sea slug. It is a dorid nudibranch, a shell-less marine gastropod mollusc in the family Chromodorididae.

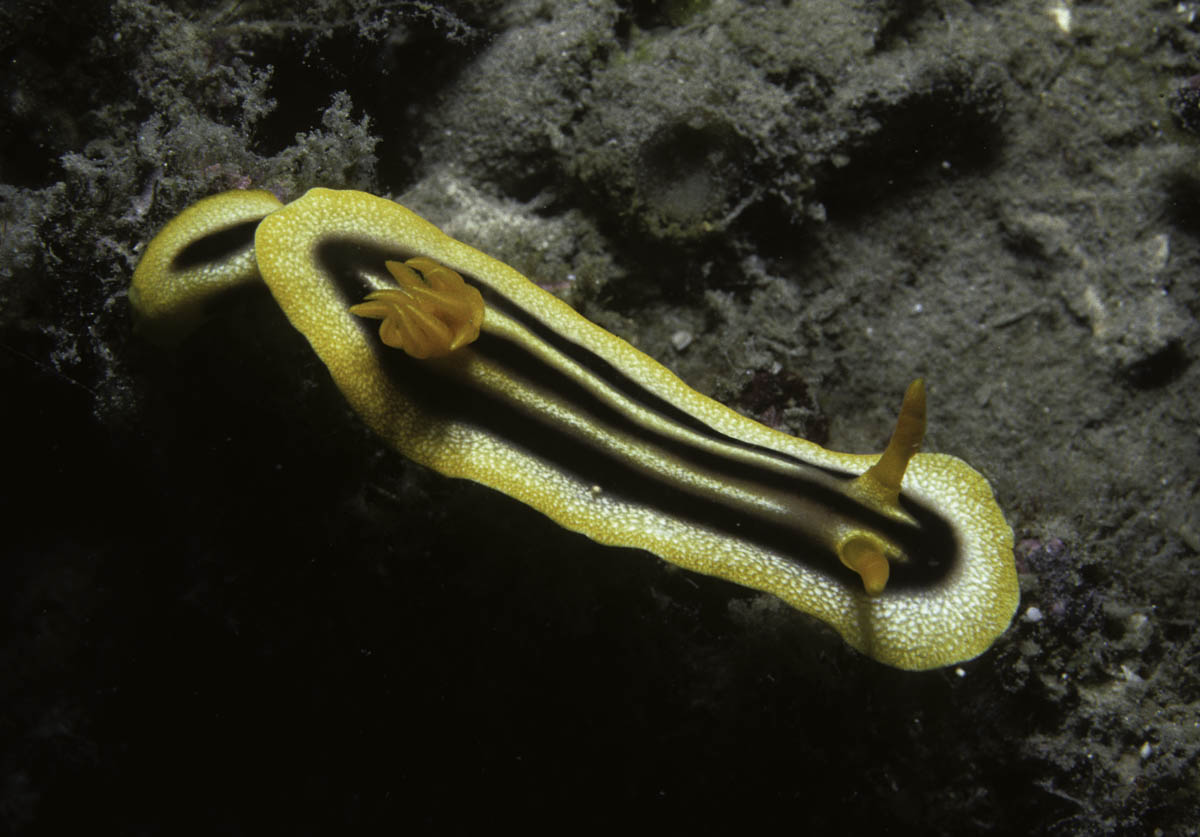
The nudibranch Chromodoris joshi, Pemuteran, Bali.

== Distribution ==
Chromodoris joshi can be found in the Philippines, Sumatra, the Andaman Sea, and Indonesia.

== Description ==
Reaching 60 mm in length, Chromodoris joshi is yellow with three black stripes on its mantle. The marginal band fades from dark golden yellow at the edge, to a buttery yellow. It is covered with white flecks. The rhinophores and gills are a pumpkin orange.
