= Chromodoris barnardi =

Scientific classification
- Kingdom: Animalia
- Phylum: Mollusca
- Class: Gastropoda
- Order: Nudibranchia
- Family: Chromodorididae
- Genus: Chromodoris
- Species: C. barnardi

Binomial name
- Chromodoris barnardi (Collingwood, 1868)

Synonyms
- Doris barnardi Collingwood, 1868 (basionym)

Species of gastropod

Chromodoris barnardi is a species of colourful sea slug, a dorid nudibranch, a marine gastropod mollusc in the family Chromodorididae.

== Distribution ==
This species was described from Makung harbour, west of Taiwan.
