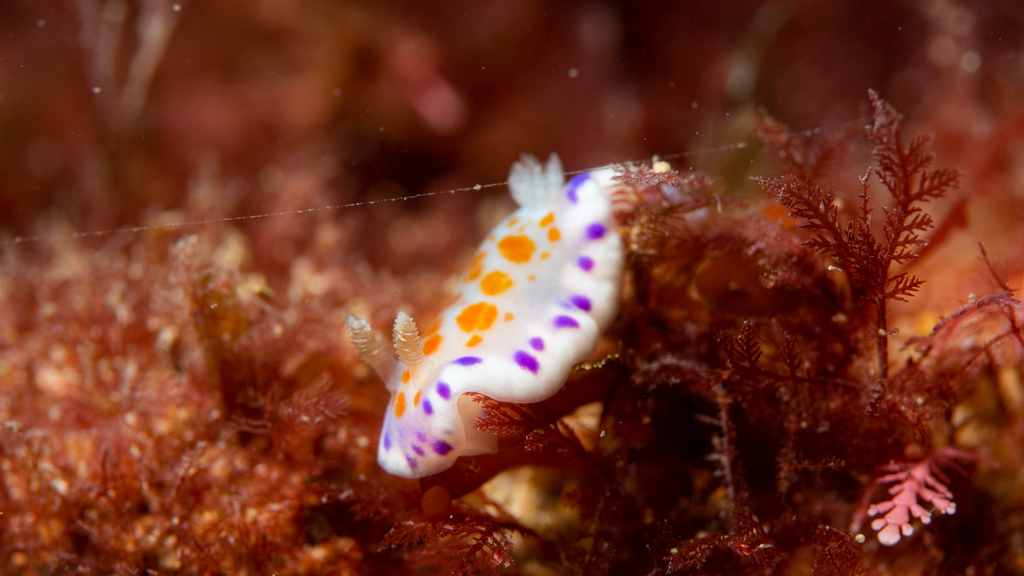

Scientific classification
- Kingdom: Animalia
- Phylum: Mollusca
- Class: Gastropoda
- Order: Nudibranchia
- Family: Chromodorididae
- Genus: Chromodoris
- Species: C. ambigua

Binomial name
- Chromodoris ambigua Rudman, 1987

= Chromodoris ambigua =

Species of sea slug

Chromodoris ambigua is a species of colourful sea slug, a dorid nudibranch, a marine gastropod mollusc in the family Chromodorididae.

== Distribution ==
This chromodorid nudibranch was described from Griffiths Point, E. Head of Port Sorell, Tasmania, Australia. It is known only from southern Australia.

== Description ==
The mantle of Chromodoris ambigua is translucent white with irregular spots of orange. The edge of the mantle has an irregular diffuse band of white with purple spots. The gills are translucent with white markings and the rhinophores are beige with white edging to the lamellae.
