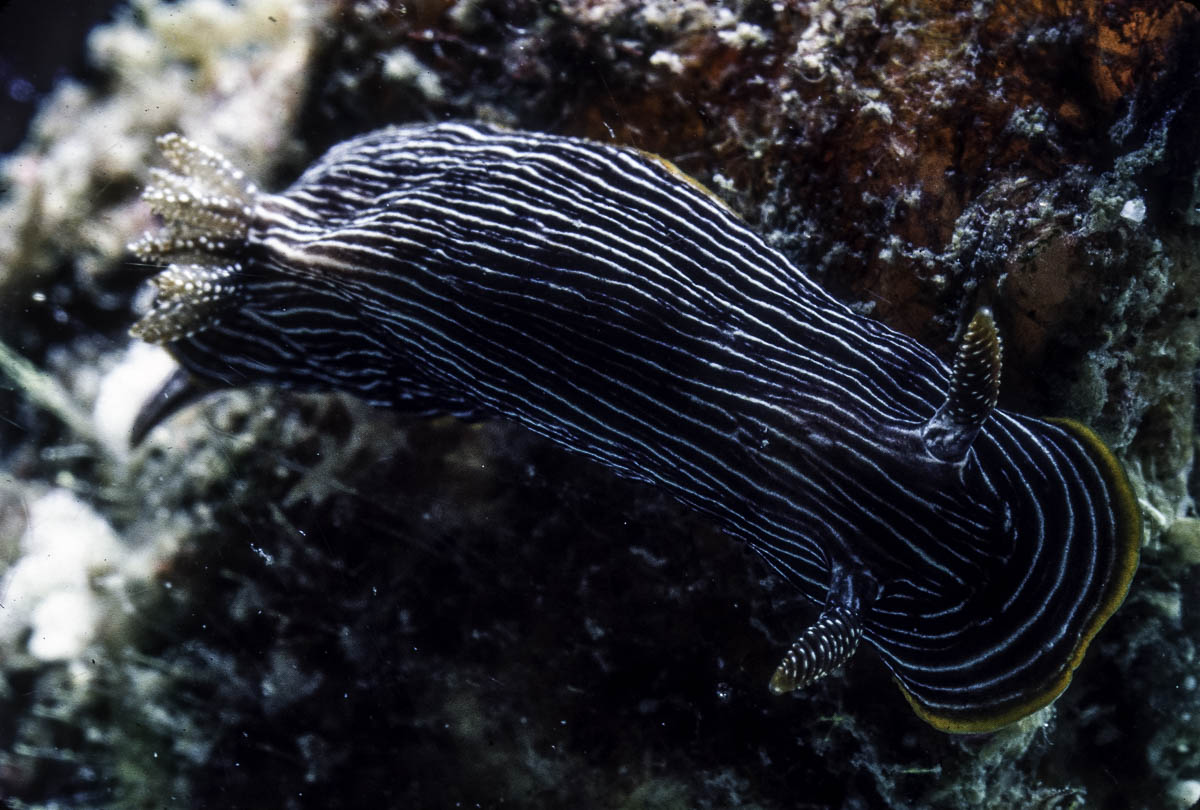
- The nudibranch Chromodoris lineolata, Mirs Bay, Hong Kong.

Scientific classification
- Kingdom: Animalia
- Phylum: Mollusca
- Class: Gastropoda
- Order: Nudibranchia
- Family: Chromodorididae
- Genus: Chromodoris
- Species: C. lineolata

Binomial name
- Chromodoris lineolata Hasselt, 1824

Synonyms
- Chromodoris albolineata Martens in Bergh, 1879; Chromodoris funerea Collingwood, 1881; Doris lineolata van Hasselt, 1824 (basionym)

= Chromodoris lineolata =

Species of gastropod

Chromodoris lineolata is a species of colourful sea slug, a dorid nudibranch, a marine gastropod mollusc in the family Chromodorididae.

== Distribution ==
This species was described from Java. It is widely distributed in the Indo-West Pacific region.

== Description ==
Chromodoris lineolata is a chromodorid nudibranch with a pattern of multiple longitudinal stripes of black or dark brown and white on the mantle. The mantle edge is orange or yellow. The gills are bushy and brown with fine white spots. The rhinophores are orange-brown and are also covered with fine white spots. This species is distinguished from the similar Chromodoris striatella by the presence of a black line next to the orange border, whilst in C. striatella the first line in from the border is white.
