= Chromodoris buchananae =

Scientific classification
- Kingdom: Animalia
- Phylum: Mollusca
- Class: Gastropoda
- Order: Nudibranchia
- Family: Chromodorididae
- Genus: Chromodoris
- Species: C. buchananae

Binomial name
- Chromodoris buchananae Gosliner & Behrens, 2000

Species of gastropod

Chromodoris buchananae is a species of colourful sea slug, a dorid nudibranch, a marine gastropod mollusc in the family Chromodorididae.

== Distribution ==
This species was described from South Solitary Island, Coffs Harbour, New South Wales, Australia. It has only been reported from northern New South Wales.
