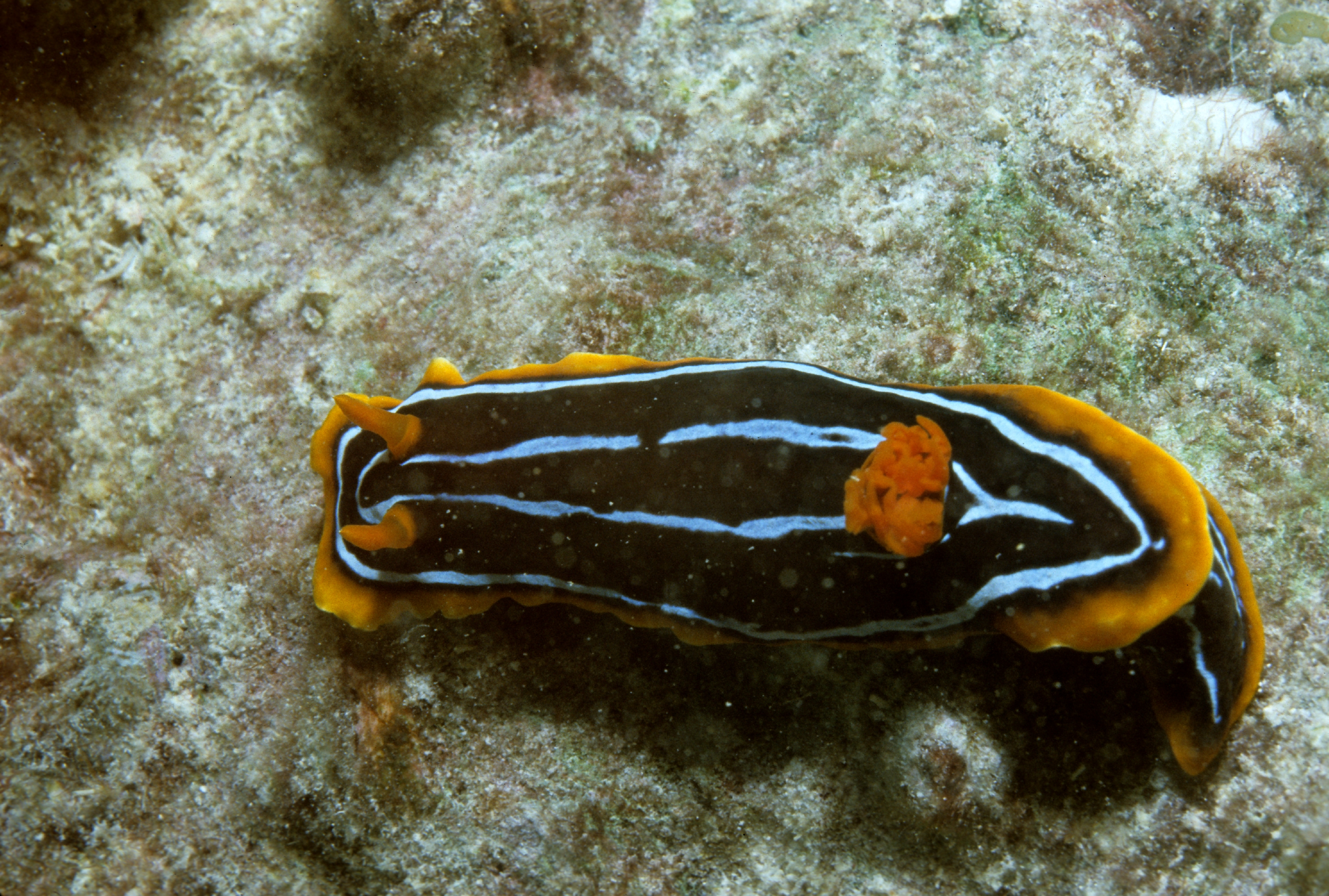
- 6m depth. S. Wistari Reef, Heron I., Australia.

Scientific classification
- Kingdom: Animalia
- Phylum: Mollusca
- Class: Gastropoda
- Order: Nudibranchia
- Family: Chromodorididae
- Genus: Chromodoris
- Species: C. kuiteri

Binomial name
- Chromodoris kuiteri Rudman, 1982

= Chromodoris kuiteri =

Species of gastropod

Chromodoris kuiteri is a species of colourful sea slug, a dorid nudibranch, a marine gastropod mollusc in the family Chromodorididae.

== Distribution ==
This species is known only from northern New South Wales, Queensland and possibly northwestern Western Australia.

== Description ==
Chromodoris kuiteri has the same basic pattern as many other Chromodoris species, a white background on the mantle with three longitudinal black stripes. However in this species the black stripes are so wide that they reduce the white to thin lines. Even the narrow space between the outer white line and the broad orange margin is filled with black. The rhinophores and gills are bright orange.
