= Chromodoris lentiginosa =

Scientific classification
- Kingdom: Animalia
- Phylum: Mollusca
- Class: Gastropoda
- Order: Nudibranchia
- Family: Chromodorididae
- Genus: Chromodoris
- Species: C. lentiginosa

Binomial name
- Chromodoris lentiginosa (Pease,1871)

Species of gastropod

Chromodoris lentiginosa is a species of sea slug, a dorid nudibranch, a shell-less marine gastropod mollusc in the family Chromodorididae.

== Distribution ==
This species was described from Huaheine, Society Islands.

== Description ==
Pease describes this species as follows:

The mantle has a widely diffused pale orange red margin, marked with a regular series of purple dots; a cream coloured line traverses each side of the back, passing around the front of each tentacle, and meeting round the branchial cavity; the space between these lines and the marginal band is marked with purple dots. The back is marked with a median interrupted cream coloured stripe, in which are also disposed purple dots. Along each side of the median stripe are several cream colored spots, with central purple dots. Branchiae colorless. Tentacles brown. The under surface of the mantle is same color as above, but paler, the color being transmitted through the pellucid mantle.

The identity of this species is currently uncertain; it has been suggested that it may be synonymous with Goniobranchus decorus. There is a glass Blaschka model of this species in the Cornell University Library.
