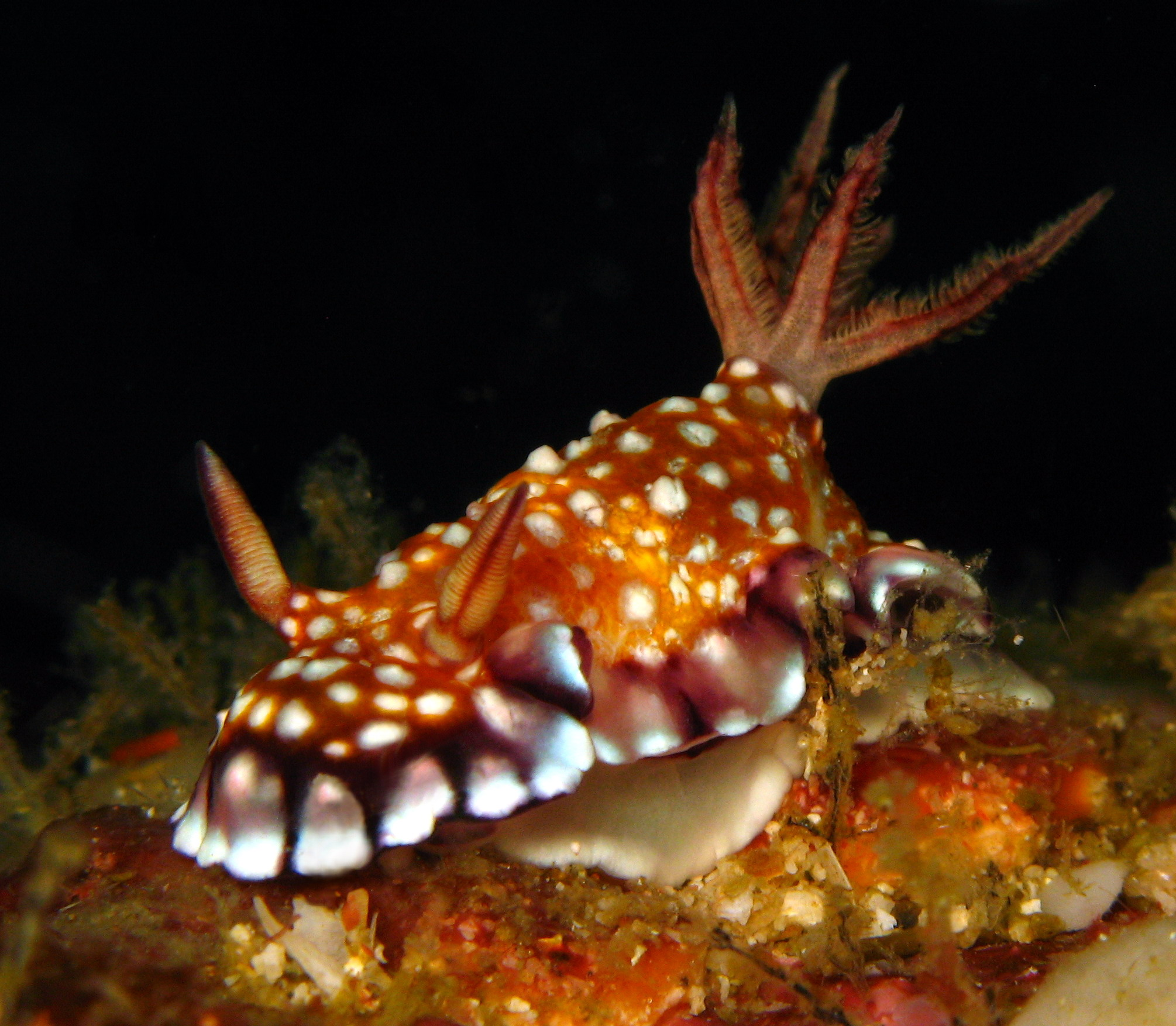
- Goniobranchus cf. roboi

Scientific classification
- Kingdom: Animalia
- Phylum: Mollusca
- Class: Gastropoda
- Order: Nudibranchia
- Family: Chromodorididae
- Genus: Goniobranchus
- Species: G. roboi

Binomial name
- Goniobranchus roboi (Gosliner & Behrens, 1998)

Synonyms
- Chromodoris roboi Gosliner & Behrens, 1998 (basionym)

= Goniobranchus roboi =

Species of gastropod

Goniobranchus roboi, common name the tooth-edged chromodoris, is a species of colourful sea slug, a dorid nudibranch, a marine gastropod mollusc in the family Chromodorididae. This species was transferred from Chromodoris to Goniobranchus in 2012.

== Distribution ==
This marine species occurs in the tropical Indo-West Pacific. It was described from Okinawa, Japan. It has been reported from Queensland, New South Wales, Sulawesi, Réunion and South Africa. Similar animals from Western Australia have a different pattern on the mantle and are intermediate between G. roboi and Goniobranchus aurigerus. There are several similar species which are not yet studied or named.

== Description ==
Goniobranchus roboi is a chromodorid nudibranch with a yellow mantle densely areolated with small white and larger lilac spots. The edge of the mantle is blue grading to white with dark purple stripes at right angles to the margin. The rhinophores and gills are white at the base grading into dark purple. The body length varies between 40 mm and 60 mm.
