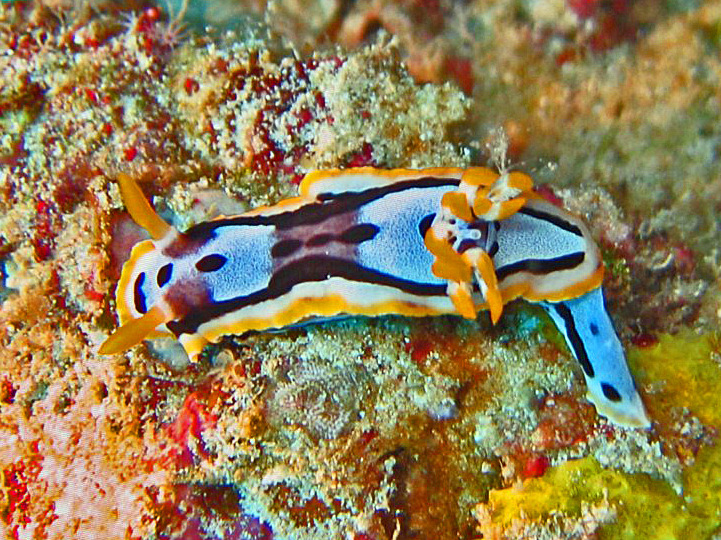
- Chromodoris michaeli in Cebu, Philippines

Scientific classification
- Kingdom: Animalia
- Phylum: Mollusca
- Class: Gastropoda
- Order: Nudibranchia
- Family: Chromodorididae
- Genus: Chromodoris
- Species: C. michaeli

Binomial name
- Chromodoris michaeli Gosliner & Behrens, 1998

= Chromodoris michaeli =

Species of gastropod

Chromodoris michaeli is a species of colourful sea slug, a dorid nudibranch, a marine gastropod mollusk in the family Chromodorididae.

== Distribution ==
Chromodoris michaeli is widespread in the Philippines.

== Description ==
Chromodoris michaeli reaches a length of about 24–46 mm (0.94–1.81 in). The upper surface of the body appears powdery blue, with white, black and orange bands encircling the mantle along the edges. Said black band is usually wider towards the middle. Within the boundaries of the black band there are a few black spots. The edge of the triangular bluish foot is orange and extended posteriorly beyond the notum. The sensory tentacles (the antennae-like rhinophores) and the main respiratory organs (gills) are orange.

== Habitat ==
This species can be found on reefs at a depth of about 22 m (72 ft).

== Ecology ==
Chromodoris michaeli, like many other nudibranchs, feeds on sponges. It has been reported to eat Negombata sp. (family Podospongiidae).
