= Chromodoris dictya =

Scientific classification
- Kingdom: Animalia
- Phylum: Mollusca
- Class: Gastropoda
- Order: Nudibranchia
- Family: Chromodorididae
- Genus: Chromodoris
- Species: C. dictya

Binomial name
- Chromodoris dictya Er. Marcus & Ev. Marcus, 1970

Species of gastropod

Chromodoris dictya is a species of colourful sea slug, a dorid nudibranch, a marine gastropod mollusc in the family Chromodorididae.

== Distribution ==
This species was described from Vega Bay, Puerto Rico.

== Description ==
Chromodoris dictya was described from a single preserved specimens and no details of its living colouration are known. As no species belonging to the restricted view of the genus Chromodoris have been discovered in the Atlantic Ocean and this species is described as similar to Glossodoris moerchi it should probably be placed in Glossodoris.
