= Chromodoris albonotata =

Scientific classification
- Kingdom: Animalia
- Phylum: Mollusca
- Class: Gastropoda
- Order: Nudibranchia
- Family: Chromodorididae
- Genus: Chromodoris
- Species: C. albonotata

Binomial name
- Chromodoris albonotata Bergh, 1875

Species of gastropod

Chromodoris albonotata is a species of colourful sea slug, a dorid nudibranch, a marine gastropod mollusc in the family Chromodorididae.

== Distribution ==
This species was described from Tahiti. It was reported from Hawaii by Bertsch & Johnson (1981) but this was an erroneous identification.
