= Goniobranchus galactos =

Scientific classification
- Kingdom: Animalia
- Phylum: Mollusca
- Class: Gastropoda
- Order: Nudibranchia
- Family: Chromodorididae
- Genus: Goniobranchus
- Species: G. galactos

Binomial name
- Goniobranchus galactos (Rudman & Johnson in Rudman, 1985)

Synonyms
- Chromodoris galactos Rudman & S. Johnson, 1985 (basionym)

Species of gastropod

Goniobranchus galactos is a species of colourful sea slug, a dorid nudibranch, a marine gastropod mollusc in the family Chromodorididae.

== Distribution ==
This species is only known from Enewetak Atoll, Marshall Islands.

== Description ==
Goniobranchus galactos is a chromodorid nudibranch with a white mantle, white gills and rhinophores. It has an orange band at the edge of the mantle and a distinctive submarginal band of purple with small opaque white spots scattered densely on this.
