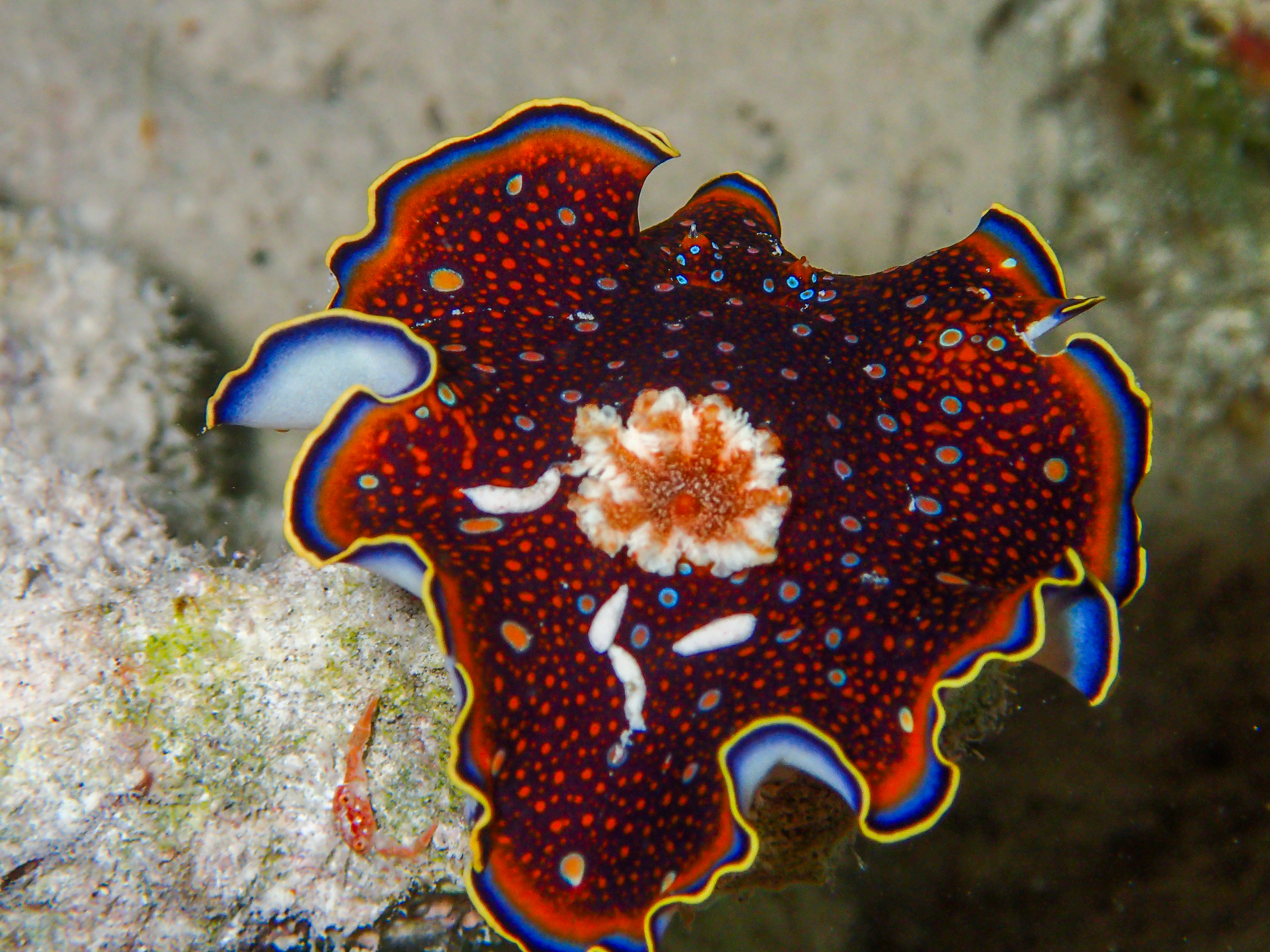
- Goniobranchus charlottae at Marsa Shoona, Egypt

Scientific classification
- Kingdom: Animalia
- Phylum: Mollusca
- Class: Gastropoda
- Order: Nudibranchia
- Family: Chromodorididae
- Genus: Goniobranchus
- Species: G. charlottae

Binomial name
- Goniobranchus charlottae (Schrödl, 1999)

Synonyms
- Chromodoris charlottae (Schrödl, 1999); Glossodoris charlottae Schrödl, 1999 (basionym)

= Goniobranchus charlottae =

Species of gastropod

Goniobranchus charlottae is a species of colourful sea slug, a dorid nudibranch, a marine gastropod mollusc in the family Chromodorididae.

== Distribution ==
This species was described from the Red Sea. It appears to be a Red Sea endemic.
