= Goniobranchus multimaculosus =

Scientific classification
- Kingdom: Animalia
- Phylum: Mollusca
- Class: Gastropoda
- Order: Nudibranchia
- Family: Chromodorididae
- Genus: Goniobranchus
- Species: G. multimaculosus

Binomial name
- Goniobranchus multimaculosus (Rudman, 1987)

Synonyms
- Chromodoris multimaculosa Rudman, 1987 (basionym)

Species of gastropod

Goniobranchus multimaculosus is a species of colourful sea slug, a dorid nudibranch, a marine gastropod mollusc in the family Chromodorididae. This species was transferred from Chromodoris to Goniobranchus in 2012.

== Distribution ==
This marine species was described from northern Tasmania.

== Description ==
Goniobranchus multimaculosus is a chromodorid nudibranch with a pink, spotted mantle. The middle of the mantle is pink with fine white specks and an irregular scattering of bright red spots and the margin is white with large orange spots.
