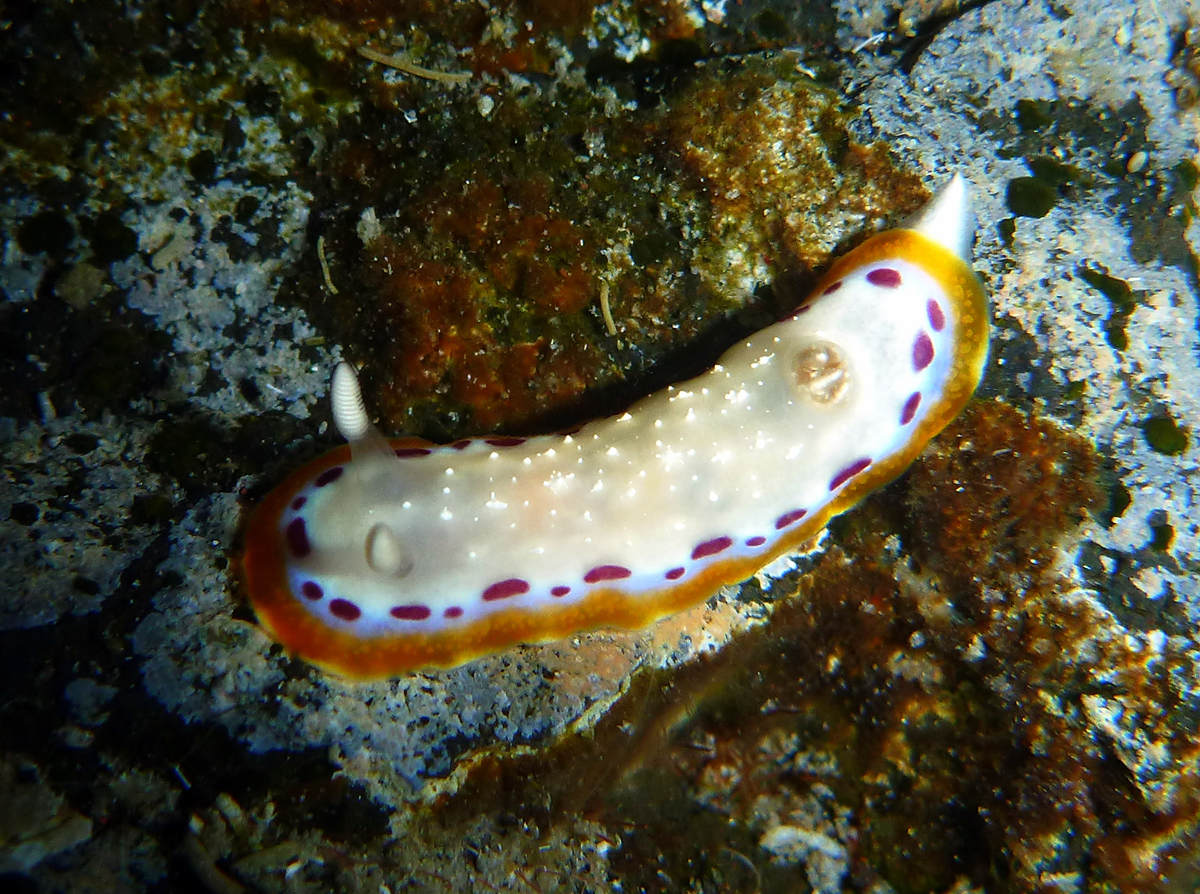
- The nudibranch Goniobranchus lekker, La Réunion.

Scientific classification
- Kingdom: Animalia
- Phylum: Mollusca
- Class: Gastropoda
- Order: Nudibranchia
- Family: Chromodorididae
- Genus: Goniobranchus
- Species: G. lekker

Binomial name
- Goniobranchus lekker (Gosliner, 1994)

Synonyms
- Chromodoris lekker Gosliner, 1994 (basionym)

= Goniobranchus lekker =

Species of gastropod

Goniobranchus lekker is a species of colourful sea slug, a dorid nudibranch, a marine gastropod mollusc in the family Chromodorididae.

== Distribution ==
This species occurs in Natal, South Africa, Madagascar, Réunion and the Seychelles.

== Description ==
Goniobranchus lekker has a complex colour pattern consisting of a translucent white mantle which at the edge grades into opaque white, then light purple with elongated dark purple spots and finally an orange margin. The middle of the back has raised white tubercles which are somewhat clustered into groups. The gill and rhinophores are marked with opaque white. The length of the body varies between 25 mm and 35 mm. There are a number of species with similar colour patterns.
