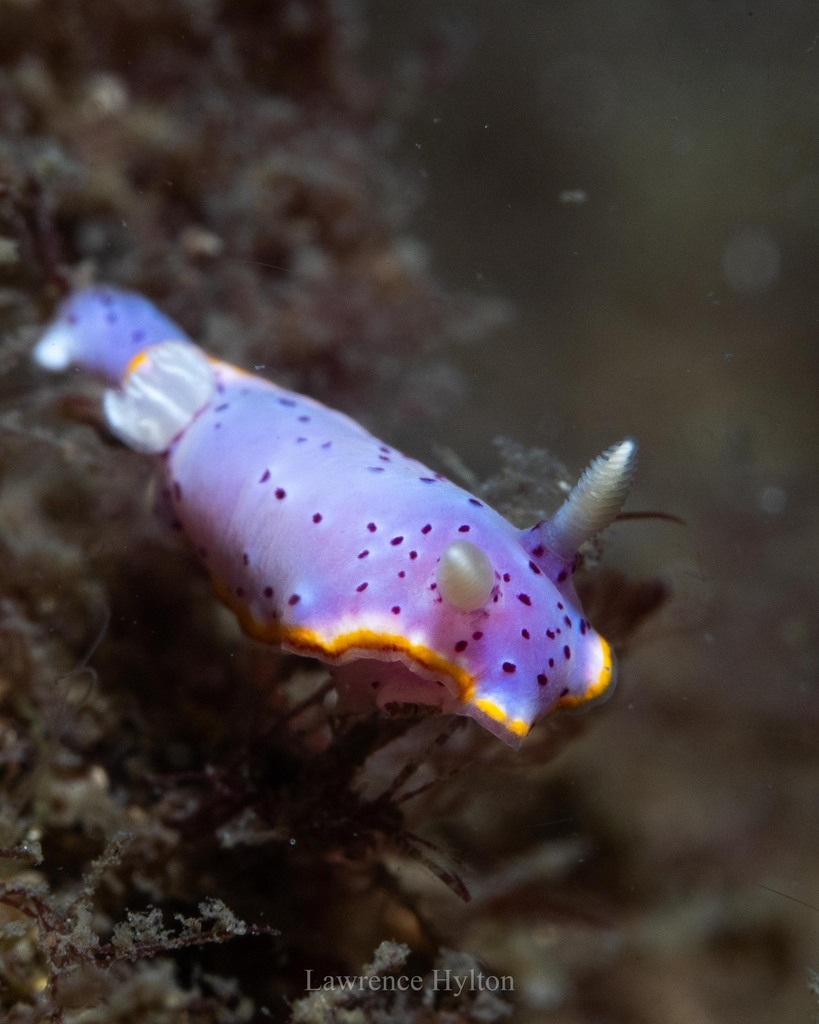

Scientific classification
- Kingdom: Animalia
- Phylum: Mollusca
- Class: Gastropoda
- Order: Nudibranchia
- Family: Chromodorididae
- Genus: Goniobranchus
- Species: G. woodwardae

Binomial name
- Goniobranchus woodwardae (Rudman, 1983)

Synonyms
- Chromodoris woodwardae Rudman, 1983 (basionym)

= Goniobranchus woodwardae =

Species of gastropod

Goniobranchus woodwardae is a species of colourful sea slug, a dorid nudibranch, a marine gastropod mollusk in the family Chromodorididae.

== Distribution ==
This marine species occurs off New South Wales, Australia.

== Description ==
Goniobranchus woodwardae has a pale lilac mantle which grades to darker pink in some individuals. There are small to medium-sized red spots scattered over the mantle and a white band at the edge followed by a narrow yellow marginal band. Chromodoris thompsoni is very similar and this is one of a group of species in SE Australia which mimic each other in colour.
