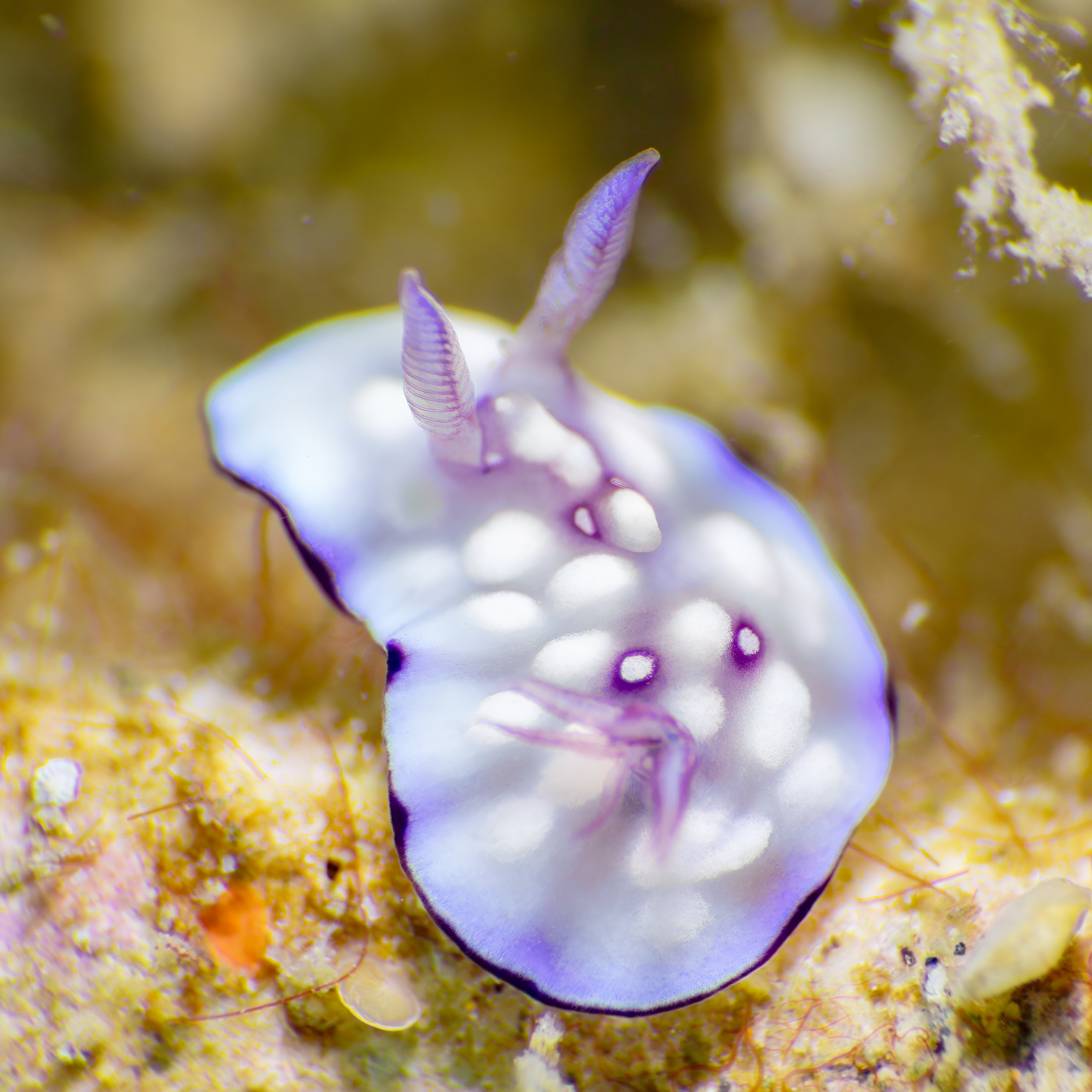

Scientific classification
- Kingdom: Animalia
- Phylum: Mollusca
- Class: Gastropoda
- Order: Nudibranchia
- Family: Chromodorididae
- Genus: Goniobranchus
- Species: G. hintuanensis

Binomial name
- Goniobranchus hintuanensis (Gosliner & Behrens, 1998)

Synonyms
- Chromodoris hintuanensis Gosliner & Behrens, 1998 (basionym)

= Goniobranchus hintuanensis =

Species of gastropod

Goniobranchus hintuanensis is a species of colorful sea slug, a dorid nudibranch, a marine gastropod mollusk in the family Chromodorididae.

== Distribution ==
This species was described from Balayan Bay, Luzon, Philippines. It has been reported from the Marshall Islands, Solomon Islands, Papua New Guinea, Indonesia, Thailand, Burma and Sri Lanka. Specimens from the Indian Ocean differ in having yellow spots in the paler patches of the dorsal pattern.
