= Goniobranchus petechialis =

Scientific classification
- Kingdom: Animalia
- Phylum: Mollusca
- Class: Gastropoda
- Order: Nudibranchia
- Family: Chromodorididae
- Genus: Goniobranchus
- Species: G. petechialis

Binomial name
- Goniobranchus petechialis (Gould, 1852)

Synonyms
- Chromodoris petechialis (Gould, 1852); Doris petechialis Gould, 1852 (basionym)

Species of gastropod

Goniobranchus petechialis is a species of colorful sea slug, a dorid nudibranch, a marine gastropod mollusk in the family Chromodorididae.

== Distribution ==
This species was described from Hawaii.

== Description ==
This species is very distinctively coloured. It has apparently only been found twice, first in 1838–42 and then in 1959, when it was photographed. The mantle has a creamy straw-coloured background with an orange border and there are irregularly shaped red spots all over the back. The gill leaves are white with red edging and the rhinophore clubs are bright orange. The body length reaches 40 mm.
