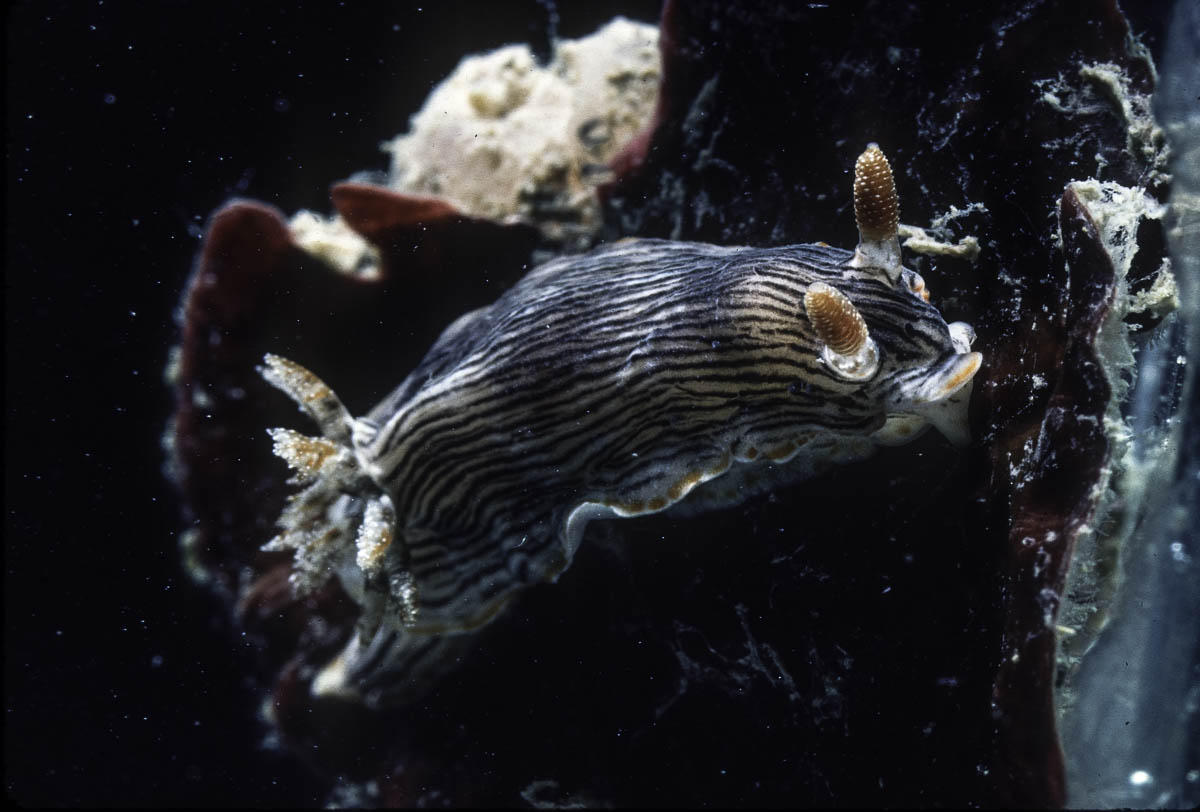
- The nudibranch Chromodoris striatella, Mirs Bay, Hong Kong.

Scientific classification
- Kingdom: Animalia
- Phylum: Mollusca
- Class: Gastropoda
- Order: Nudibranchia
- Family: Chromodorididae
- Genus: Chromodoris
- Species: C. striatella

Binomial name
- Chromodoris striatella Bergh, 1877

= Chromodoris striatella =

Species of gastropod

Chromodoris striatella is a species of colourful sea slug, a dorid nudibranch, a marine gastropod mollusc in the family Chromodorididae.

== Distribution ==
This species was described from Indonesia as Chromodoris lineolata Bergh, 1874. In 1877 Bergh realised his mistake and named it Chromodoris striatella. It has been reported from Indonesia, the Philippines, New Caledonia, Hong Kong, Japan and Eastern Australia.

== Description ==
Chromodoris striatella is a chromodorid nudibranch with a pattern of multiple longitudinal stripes of dark brown on a white background on the mantle. The mantle edge is orange or yellow. The gills are brown with fine white spots. The rhinophores are orange-brown and are also covered with fine white spots. This species is distinguished from the similar Chromodoris lineolata by the presence of the white background colour next to the orange border in C. striatella, whilst in C. lineolata the first line in from the border is black.
