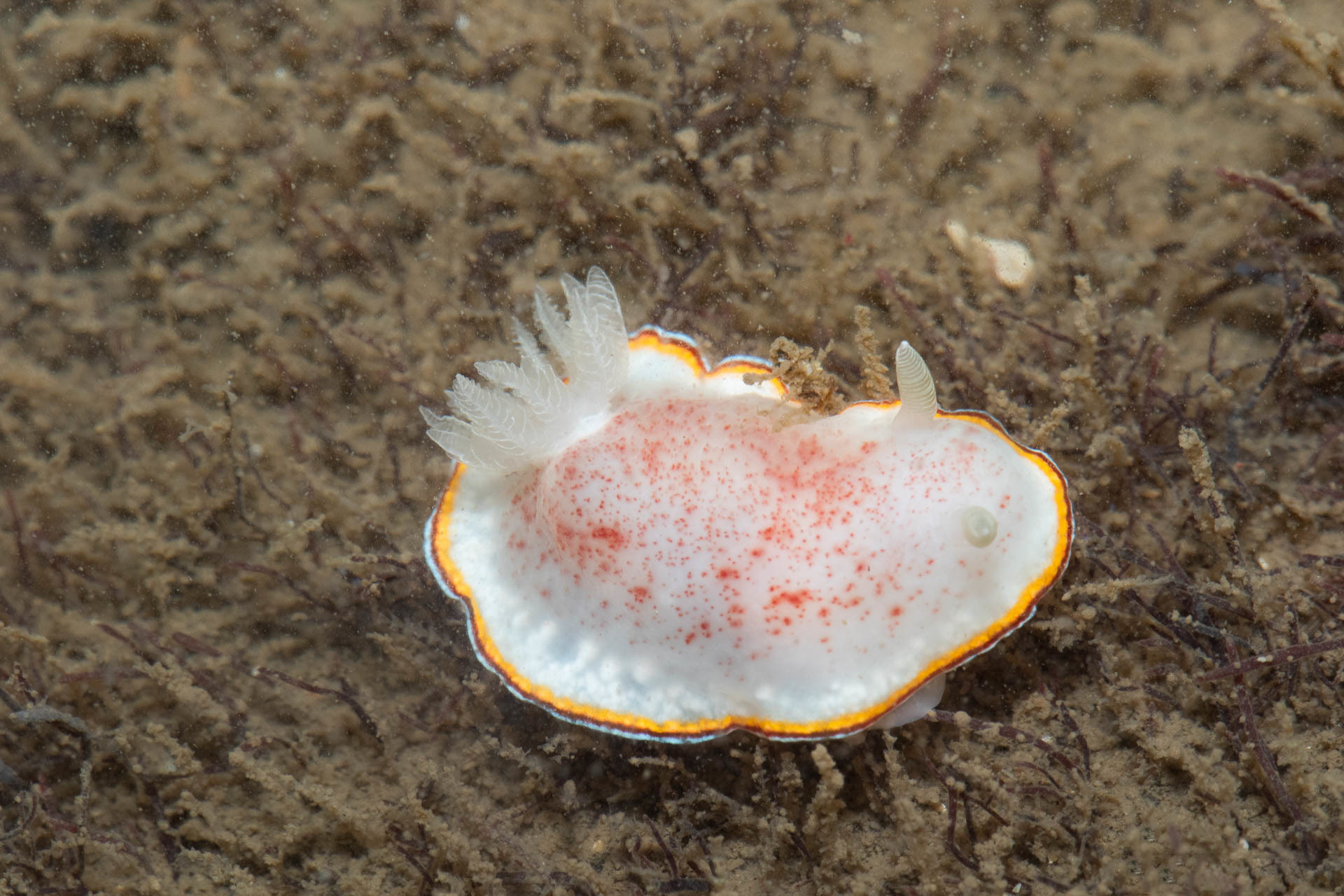
- Photographed in Mumbai in June 2019

Scientific classification
- Kingdom: Animalia
- Phylum: Mollusca
- Class: Gastropoda
- Order: Nudibranchia
- Family: Chromodorididae
- Genus: Goniobranchus
- Species: G. trimarginatus

Binomial name
- Goniobranchus trimarginatus (Winckworth, 1946)

Synonyms
- Chromodoris trimarginata (Winckworth, 1946); Glossodoris trimarginata Winckworth, 1946 (basionym)

= Goniobranchus trimarginatus =

Species of gastropod

Goniobranchus trimarginatus is a species of colourful sea slug, a dorid nudibranch, a marine gastropod mollusk in the family Chromodorididae.

== Distribution ==
This species was described from Bombay, India. It is reported from the Northern Indian Ocean to Malaysia.

== Description ==
Goniobranchus trimarginatus has a translucent white mantle covered with small irregular red spots and patches. At the edge of the mantle, a dense band of white glands show through the skin and the mantle is edged with three thin bands, yellow, wine red, and then at the extreme edge another thin white band. Its gills and rhinophore clubs are translucent white with opaque white edging. Its body reaches a length of 30 mm.
