= Goniobranchus aurigerus =

Scientific classification
- Kingdom: Animalia
- Phylum: Mollusca
- Class: Gastropoda
- Order: Nudibranchia
- Family: Chromodorididae
- Genus: Goniobranchus
- Species: G. aurigerus

Binomial name
- Goniobranchus aurigerus (Rudman, 1990)

Synonyms
- Chromodoris aurigera Rudman, 1990 (basionym)

Species of gastropod

Goniobranchus aurigerus is a species of colourful sea slug, a dorid nudibranch, a marine gastropod mollusc in the family Chromodorididae.

== Distribution ==
This species was described from Quinns Rocks, near Perth, Western Australia. It has been reported from Indonesia.
