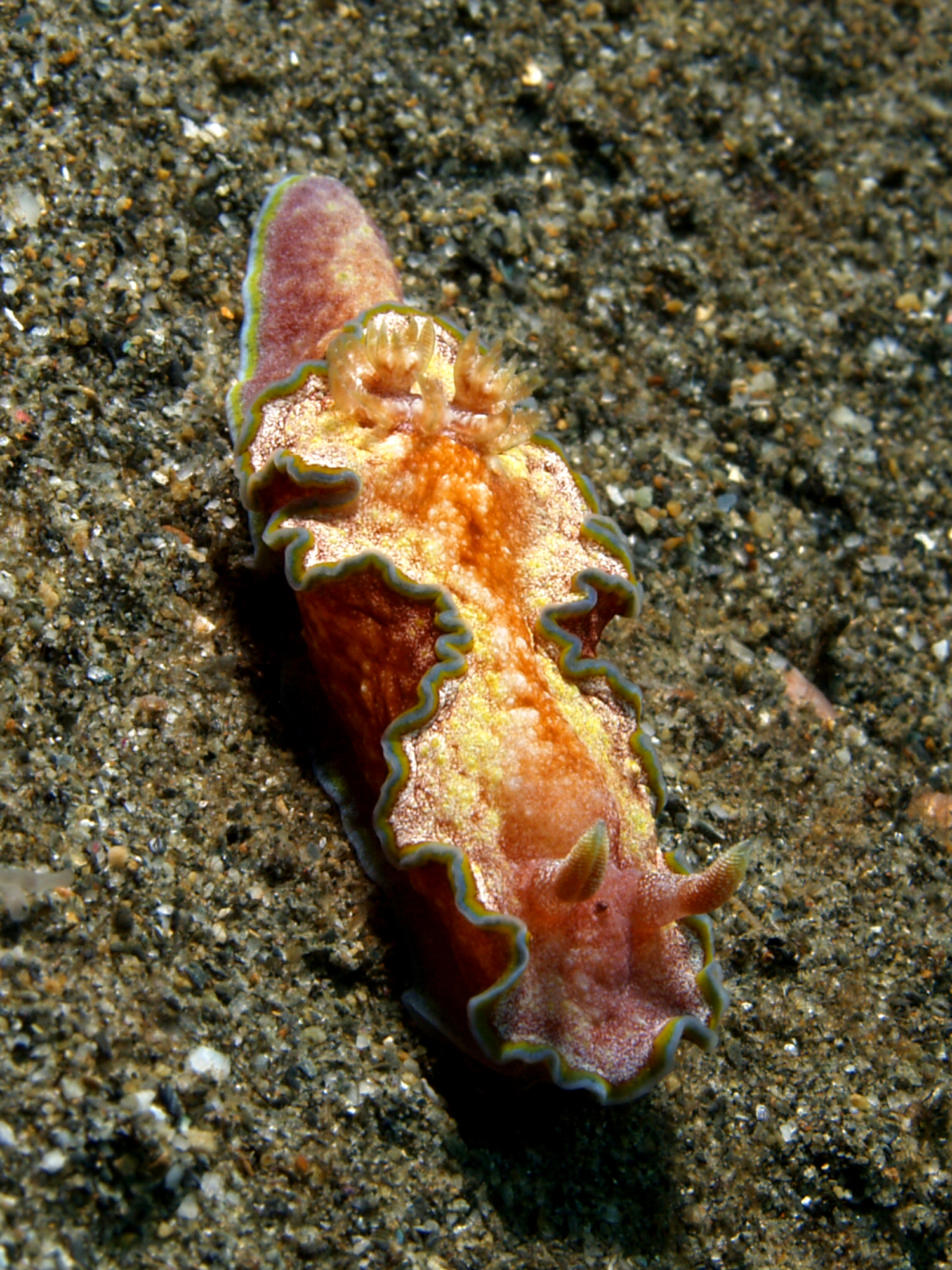
- Glossodoris acosti from East Timor

Scientific classification
- Kingdom: Animalia
- Phylum: Mollusca
- Class: Gastropoda
- Order: Nudibranchia
- Family: Chromodorididae
- Genus: Glossodoris; Ehrenberg, 1831

Type species
- Doris xantholeuca Ehrenberg, 1831

Synonyms
- Casella H. Adams & A. Adams, 1854; Chromolaichma Bertsch, 1977; Rosodoris Pruvot-Fol, 1954

= Glossodoris =

Genus of gastropods

Glossodoris is a genus of sea slugs, dorid nudibranchs, shell-less marine gastropod mollusks in the family Chromodorididae.

== Taxonomic history ==
The use of the genus name Glossodoris has been a subject of debate amongst taxonomists for over 150 years. Because it is the oldest name in the Chromodorididae it has been used differently by different taxonomists, sometimes including many species of Hypselodoris and Chromodoris and the other smaller genera recognised today. Its modern status is based on the analysis of DNA sequences.

== Species ==
Species in the genus Glossodoris include:

- Glossodoris acosti Matsuda & Gosliner, 2018
- Glossodoris aeruginosa Rudman, 1995
- Glossodoris andersonae Matsuda & Gosliner, 2018
- Glossodoris angasi Rudman, 1986
- Glossodoris aureola Rudman, 1995
- Glossodoris bonwanga Matsuda & Gosliner, 2018
- Glossodoris buko Matsuda & Gosliner, 2018
- Glossodoris cincta (Bergh, 1888)
- Glossodoris erythraea Ehrenberg, 1831
- Glossodoris gregorius Rudman, 1986
- Glossodoris hikuerensis Pruvot-Fol, 1954
- Glossodoris kahlbrocki Yonow, 2018
- Glossodoris katoi Baba, 1938
- Glossodoris kophos Yonow, 2001
- Glossodoris limbata Vicente, 1967
- Glossodoris lamberti (Crosse, 1875)
- Glossodoris misakinosibogae Baba, 1988
- Glossodoris moerchi (Bergh, 1879)
- Glossodoris pallida Ruppell & Leuckart, 1828
- Glossodoris pantherina (Bergh, 1905)
- Glossodoris prismatica (Pease, 1860)
- Glossodoris rufomarginata (Bergh, 1890)
- Glossodoris semeion Winckworth, 1946
- Glossodoris souverbiei (Crosse, 1875)
- Glossodoris thalassopora (Bergh, 1879)
- Glossodoris vespa Rudman, 1990
- Glossodoris xishaensis Lin, 1975
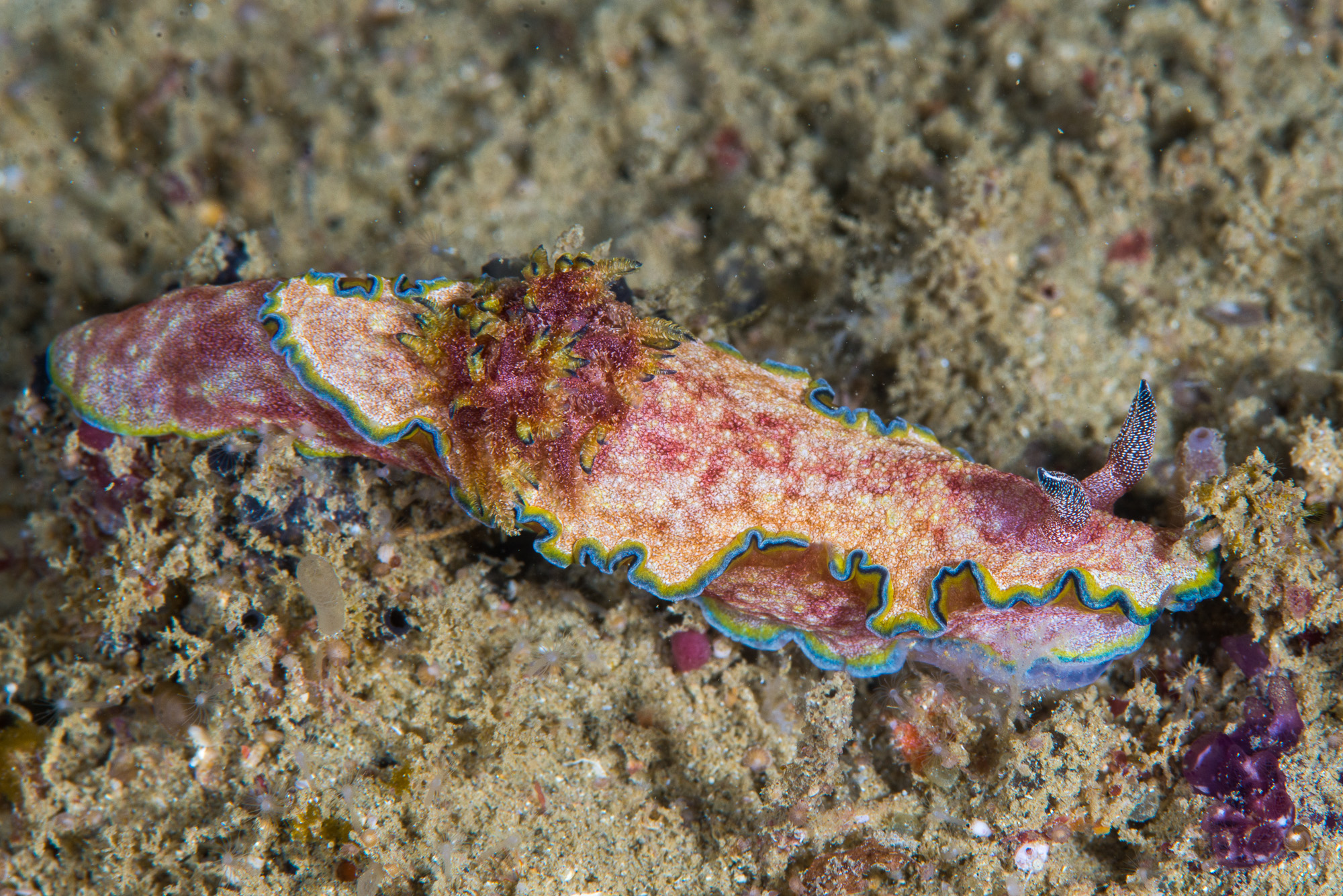
Glossodoris acosti

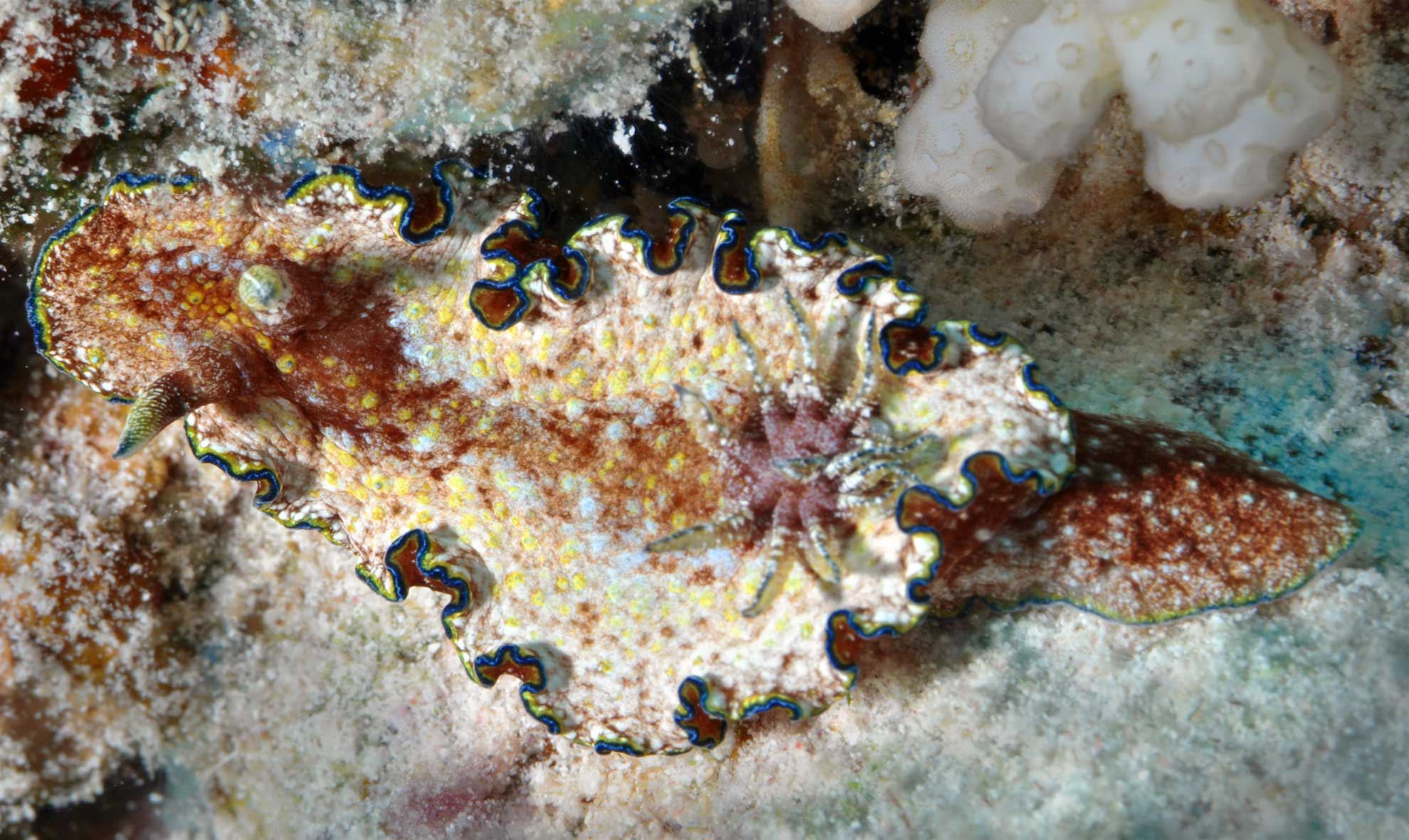
Glossodoris andersonae

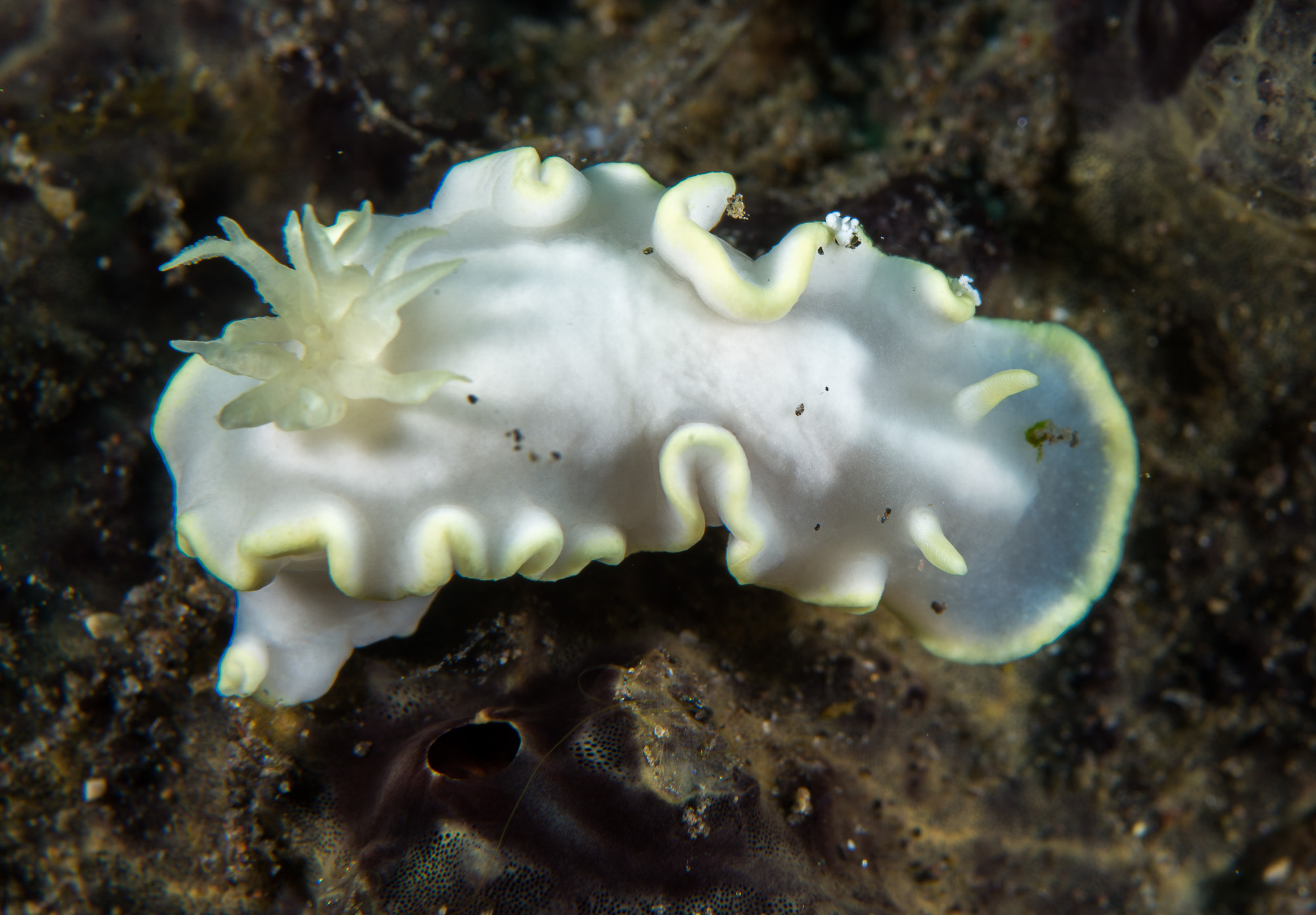
Glossodoris buko

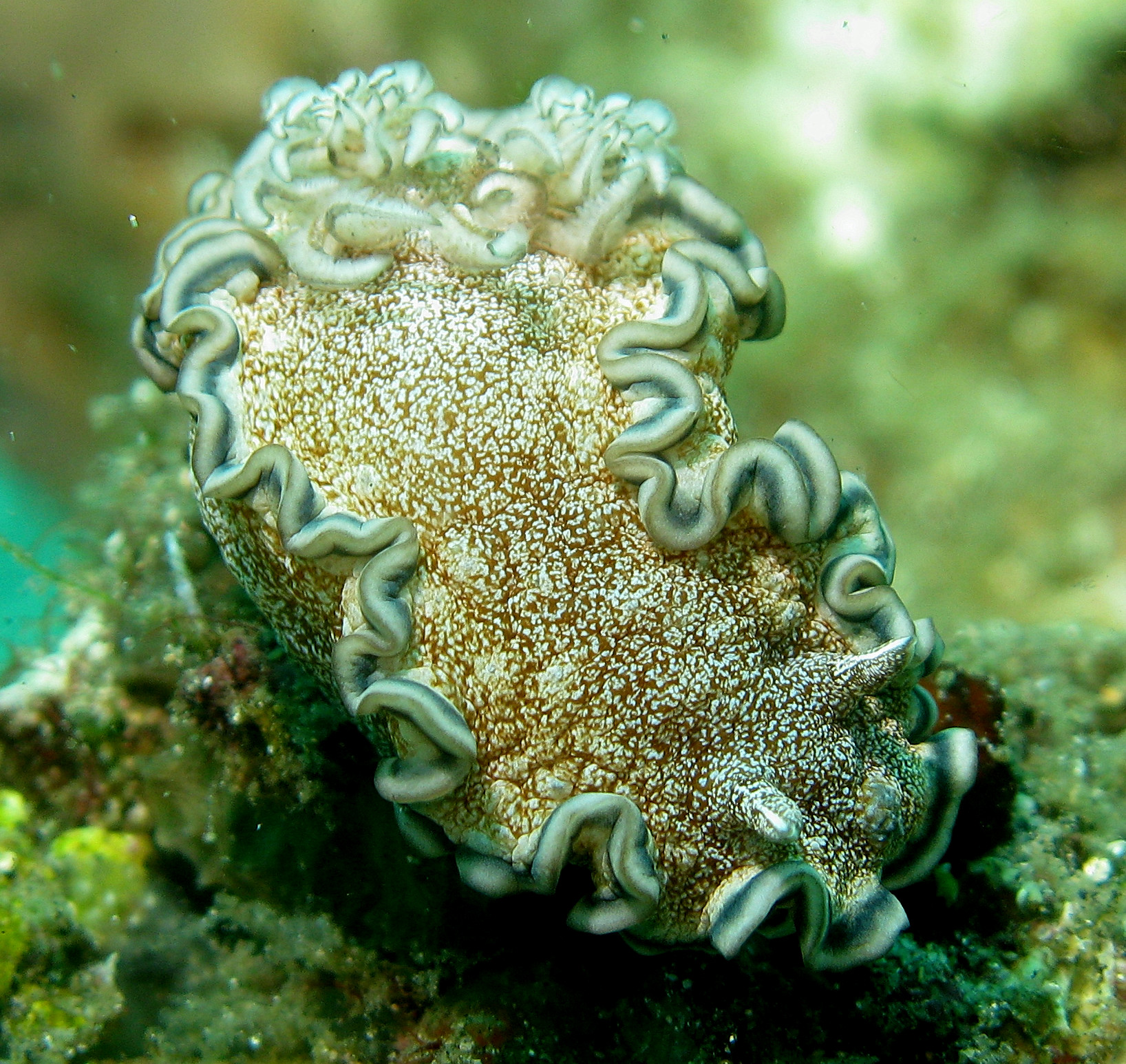
Glossodoris hikuerensis

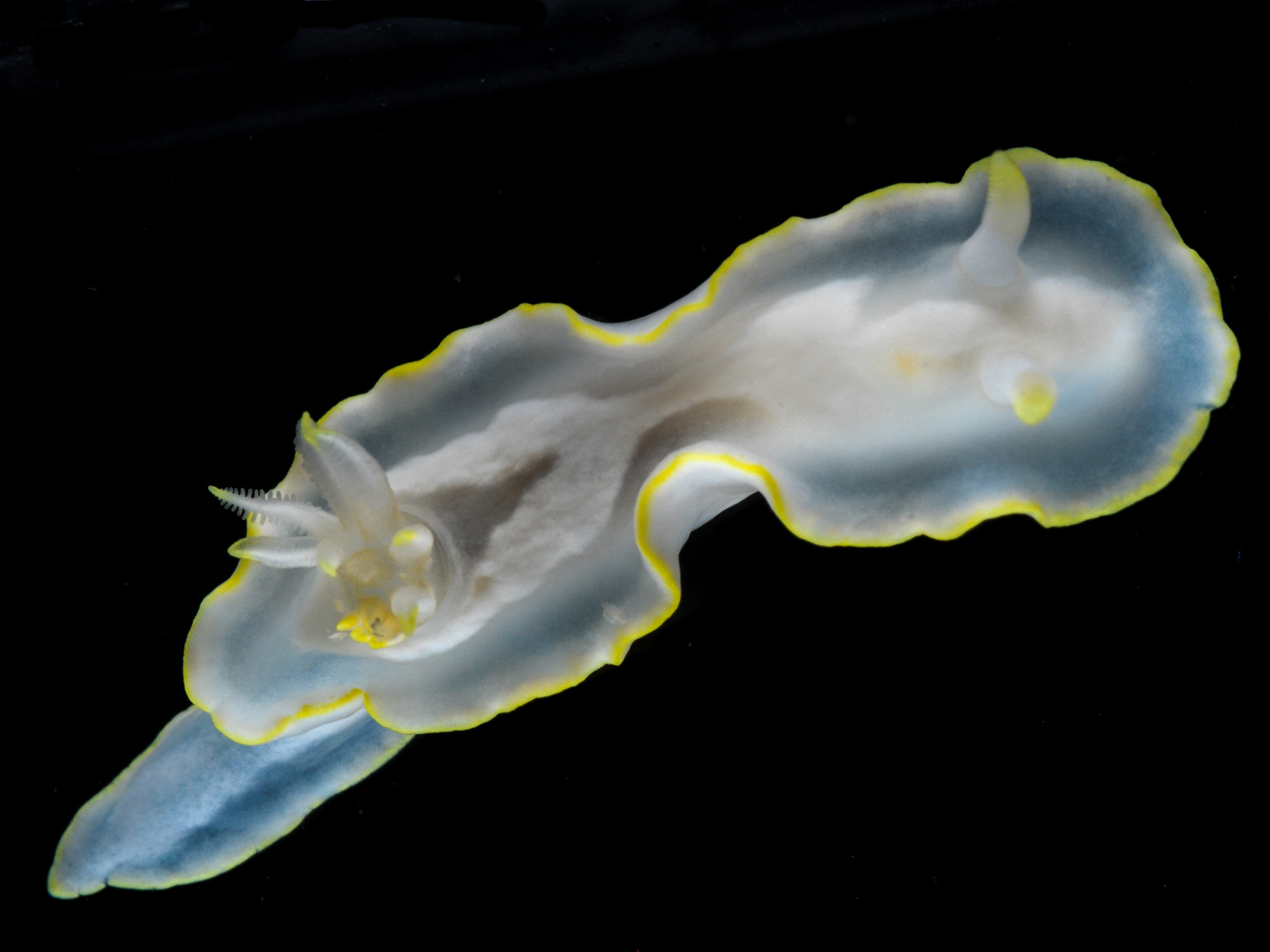
Glossodoris pallida

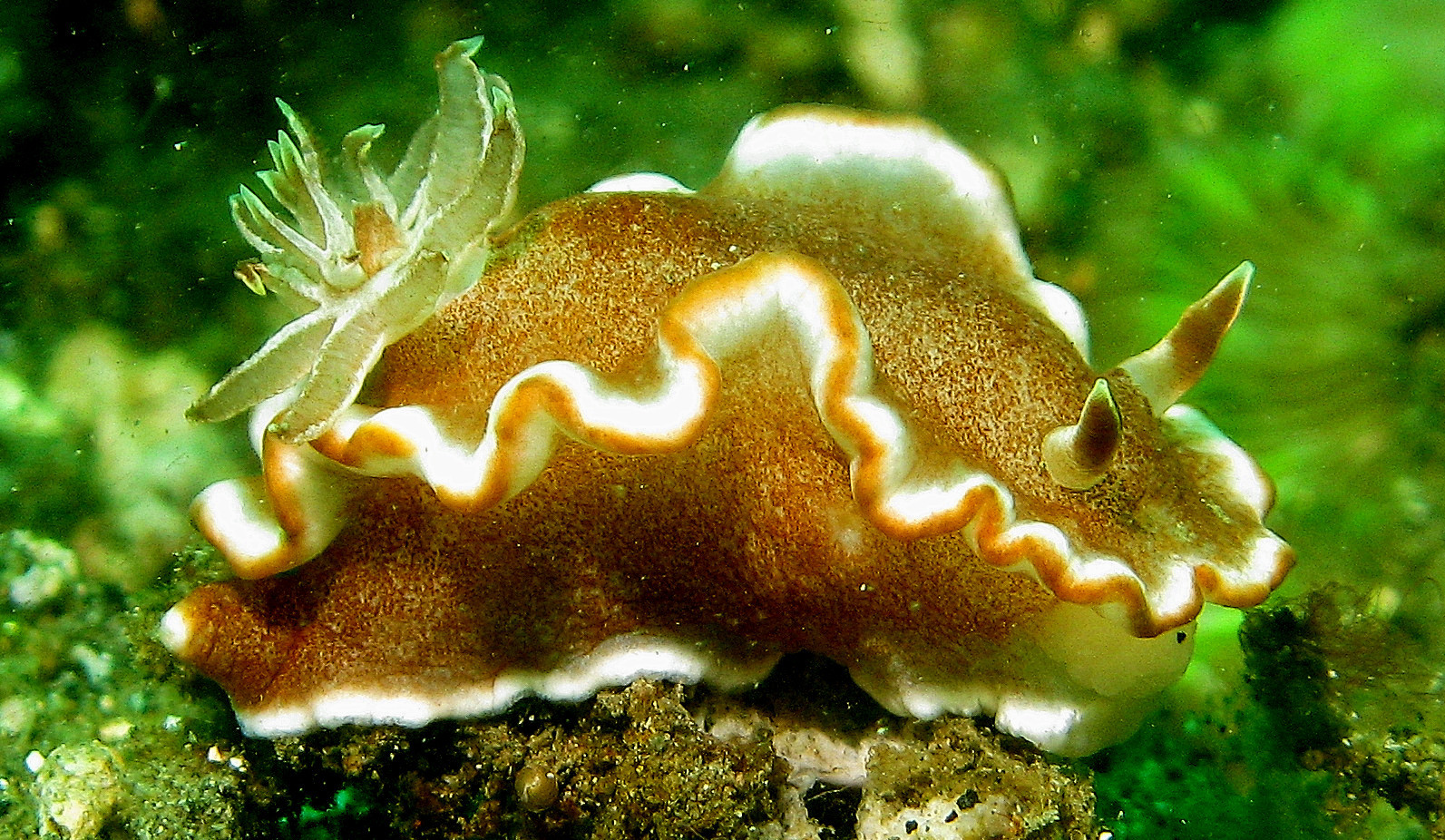
Glossodoris rufomarginata

Species brought into synonymy

- Glossodoris acriba: synonym of Felimare acriba
- Glossodoris aegialia (Bergh, 1904): synonym of Hypselodoris aegialia (Bergh, 1904): synonym of Felimare agassizii (Bergh, 1894)
- Glossodoris agassizi: synonym of Felimare agassizii (Bergh, 1894)
- Glossodoris albomaculata (Pease, 1866): synonym of Goniobranchus albomaculatus Pease, 1866
- Glossodoris alternata Burn, 1957: synonym of Chromodoris alternata (Burn, 1957)
- Glossodoris amoena (Cheeseman, 1886): synonym of Ceratosoma amoenum (Cheeseman, 1886)
- Glossodoris annulata (Eliot, 1904): synonym of Goniobranchus annulatus (Eliot, 1904)
- Glossodoris arbuta Burn, 1961: synonym of Thorunna arbuta (Burn, 1961)
- Glossodoris atopa (Bergh, 1905): synonym of Ceratosoma amoenum (Cheeseman, 1886)
- Glossodoris atromarginata Cuvier, 1804: synonym of Doriprismatica atromarginata (Cuvier, 1804)
- Glossodoris aureomarginata (Cheeseman, 1881): synonym of Goniobranchus aureomarginatus (Cheeseman, 1881)
- Glossodoris aureopurpurea (Collingwood, 1881): synonym of Goniobranchus aureopurpureus (Collingwood, 1881)
- Glossodoris australis (Risbec, 1928): synonym of Thorunna australis (Risbec, 1928)
- Glossodoris averni Rudman, 1985: synonym of Ardeadoris averni (Rudman, 1985)
- Glossodoris baumanni (Bertsch, 1970): synonym of Felimida baumanni (Bertsch, 1970)
- Glossodoris bennetti (Angas, 1864): synonym of Hypselodoris bennetti (Angas, 1864)
- Glossodoris bilineata Pruvot-Fol, 1953: synonym of Felimare bilineata (Pruvot-Fol, 1953)
- Glossodoris bombayana Winckworth, 1946: synonym of Goniobranchus bombayanus (Winckworth, 1946)
- Glossodoris californiensis: synonym of Felimare californiensis
- Glossodoris capensis Barnard, 1927: synonym of Hypselodoris capensis (Barnard, 1927)
- Glossodoris carlsoni Rudman, 1986: synonym of Ardeadoris carlsoni (Rudman, 1986)
- Glossodoris cavae (Eliot, 1904): synonym of Goniobranchus cavae (Eliot, 1904)
- Glossodoris charlottae: synonym of Goniobranchus charlottae (Schrödl, 1999)
- Glossodoris clenchi: synonym of Felimida clenchi (Russell, 1935)
- Glossodoris clitonota (Bergh, 1905): synonym of Mexichromis lemniscata (Quoy & Gaimard, 1832)
- Glossodoris coelestis (Deshayes in Fredol, 1865): synonym of Felimare orsinii (Vérany, 1846)
- Glossodoris coi Risbec, 1956: synonym of Goniobranchus coi (Risbec, 1956)
- Glossodoris cruenta Rudman, 1986: synonym of Ardeadoris cruenta (Rudman, 1986)
- Glossodoris dalli (Bergh, 1879): synonym of Felimida dalli (Bergh, 1879)
- Glossodoris daphne (Angas, 1864): synonym of Goniobranchus daphne (Angas, 1864)
- Glossodoris decora (Pease, 1860): synonym of Goniobranchus decorus (Pease, 1860)
- Glossodoris decorata (Risbec, 1928): synonym of Hypselodoris maculosa (Pease, 1871)
- Glossodoris dendrobranchia Rudman, 1990: synonym of Doriprismatica dendrobranchia (Rudman, 1990)
- Glossodoris dollfusi Pruvot-Fol, 1933: synonym of Hypselodoris dollfusi (Pruvot-Fol, 1933)
- Glossodoris dorbignii Gray, 1850: synonym of Doris sticta (Iredale & O'Donoghue, 1923)
- Glossodoris edenticulata: synonym of Hypselodoris picta (Schultz in Philippi, 1836)
- Glossodoris edmundsi Cervera, Garcia-Gomez & Ortea, 1989: synonym of Felimida edmundsi (Cervera, Garcia-Gomez & Ortea, 1989)
- Glossodoris electra Rudman, 1990: synonym of Ardeadoris electra (Rudman, 1990)
- Glossodoris festiva (A. Adams, 1861): synonym of Hypselodoris festiva (A. Adams, 1861)
- Glossodoris fidelis (Kelaart, 1858): synonym of Goniobranchus fidelis (Kelaart, 1858)
- Glossodoris flava (Eliot, 1904): synonym of Diversidoris flava (Eliot, 1904)
- Glossodoris florens Baba, 1949: synonym of Thorunna florens (Baba, 1949)
- Glossodoris fontandraui Pruvot-Fol, 1951: synonym of Felimare fontandraui (Pruvot-Fol, 1951)
- Glossodoris ghanensis Edmunds, 1968: synonym of Felimida ghanensis (Edmunds, 1968)
- Glossodoris haliclona Burn, 1957: synonym of Noumea haliclona (Burn, 1957)
- Glossodoris inornata Pease, 1871: synonym of Chromodoris aspersa (Gould, 1852)
- Glossodoris kulonba (Burn, 1966): synonym of Doriprismatica kulonba (Burn, 1966)
- Glossodoris kuniei (Provot-Fol, 1930): synonym of Goniobranchus kuniei (Pruvot-Fol, 1930)
- Glossodoris lata (Risbec, 1827): synonym of Chromodoris lata Risbec, 1928
- Glossodoris lemniscata (Quoy & Gaimard, 1832): synonym of Mexichromis lemniscata (Quoy & Gaimard, 1832)
- Glossodoris luteopunctata Gantès, 1962: synonym of Felimida luteopunctata (Gantès, 1962)
- Glossodoris maccarthyi (Kelaart, 1858): synonym of Doriprismatica atromarginata (Cuvier, 1804)
- Glossodoris macfarlandi: synonym of Felimida macfarlandi
- Glossodoris marginata (Pease, 1860): synonym of Goniobranchus verrieri (Crosse, 1875)
- Glossodoris mariei (Crosse, 1872): synonym of Mexichromis mariei (Crosse, 1872)
- Glossodoris maritima Baba, 1949: synonym of Hypselodoris maritima (Baba, 1949)
- Glossodoris multituberculata Baba, 1953: synonym of Mexichromis multituberculata (Baba, 1953)
- Glossodoris ndukuei (Risbec, 1928): synonym of Goniobranchus decorus (Pease, 1860)
- Glossodoris neona: synonym of Felimida neona (Er. Marcus, 1955)
- Glossodoris nona Baba, 1953: synonym of Chromodoris nona (Baba, 1953)
- Glossodoris norrisi: synonym of Felimida norrisi (Farmer, 1963)
- Glossodoris ocellata Ortea, Gofas & Valdés, 1997: synonym of Felimida ocellata (Ortea, Gofas & Valdés, 1997)
- Glossodoris odhneri Risbec, 1953: synonym of Hypselodoris tryoni (Garrett, 1873)
- Glossodoris orsinii (Vérany, 1846): synonym of Felimare orsinii (Vérany, 1846)
- Glossodoris paladentata Rudman, 1986: synonym of Doriprismatica paladentata (Rudman, 1986)
- Glossodoris perplexa: synonym of Thorunna perplexa (Burn, 1957)
- Glossodoris picta (Schultz in Philippi, 1836): synonym of Felimare picta (Schultz in Philippi, 1836)
- Glossodoris placida Baba, 1949: synonym of Hypselodoris placida (Baba, 1949)
- Glossodoris plumbea (Pagenstecher, 1877): synonym of Doriprismatica plumbea (Pagenstecher, 1877)
- Glossodoris poliahu Bertsch & Gosliner, 1989: synonym of Ardeadoris poliahu (Bertsch & Gosliner, 1989)
- Glossodoris porterae: synonym of Mexichromis porterae
- Glossodoris pullata Rudman, 1995: synonym of Ardeadoris pullata (Rudman, 1995)
- Glossodoris punctilucens (Bergh, 1890): synonym of Felimida punctilucens (Bergh, 1890)
- Glossodoris purpurea: synonym of Felimida purpurea
- Glossodoris quadricolor: synonym of Chromodoris quadricolor (Rüppell & Leuckart, 1828)
- Glossodoris ransoni Pruvot-Fol, 1954: synonym of Goniobranchus kuniei (Pruvot-Fol, 1930)
- Glossodoris rubroannulata Rudman, 1986: synonym of Ardeadoris rubroannulata (Rudman, 1986)
- Glossodoris rufomaculata (Pease, 1871): synonym of Goniobranchus rufomaculatus (Pease, 1871)
- Glossodoris runcinata (Bergh, 1877): synonym of Hypselodoris infucata (Rüppell & Leuckart, 1831)
- Glossodoris sagamiensis Baba, 1949: synonym of Hypselodoris sagamiensis (Baba, 1949)
- Glossodoris sedna Ev. Marcus & Er. Marcus, 1967: synonym of Doriprismatica sedna (Ev. Marcus & Er. Marcus, 1967)
- Glossodoris setoensis Baba, 1938: synonym of Goniobranchus setoensis (Baba, 1938)
- Glossodoris shirarae Baba, 1953: synonym of Goniobranchus tumuliferus (Collingwood, 1881)
- Glossodoris sibogae (Bergh, 1905): synonym of Doriprismatica sibogae (Bergh, 1905)
- Glossodoris stellata Rudman, 1986: synonym of Doriprismatica stellata (Rudman, 1986)
- Glossodoris symmetrica Rudman, 1990: synonym of Ardeadoris symmetrica (Rudman, 1990)
- Glossodoris tasmaniensis (Bergh, 1905): synonym of Goniobranchus tasmaniensis (Bergh, 1905)
- Glossodoris tennentana (Kelaart, 1859): synonym of Goniobranchus tennentanus (Kelaart, 1859)
- Glossodoris tibboeli Valdés & Adams, 2005: synonym of Doriprismatica tibboeli (Valdés & M.J. Adams, 2005)
- Glossodoris tomsmithi Bertsch & Gosliner, 1989: synonym of Ardeadoris tomsmithi (Bertsch & Gosliner, 1989)
- Glossodoris tricolor: synonym of Felimare tricolor (Cantraine, 1835)
- Glossodoris trimarginata Winckworth, 1946: synonym of Goniobranchus trimarginatus (Winckworth, 1946)
- Glossodoris tumulifera (Collinwood, 1881): synonym of Goniobranchus tumuliferus (Collingwood, 1881)
- Glossodoris tura: synonym of Mexichromis tura (Marcus & Marcus, 1967)
- Glossodoris undaurum Rudman, 1985: synonym of Ardeadoris undaurum (Rudman, 1985)
- Glossodoris undulata Pruvot-Fol, 1954: synonym of Doriprismatica sibogae (Bergh, 1905)
- Glossodoris valenciennesi (Cantraine, 1841): synonym of Felimare picta (Schultz in Philippi, 1836)
- Glossodoris variata (Risbec, 1928): synonym of Goniobranchus aureopurpureus (Collingwood, 1881)
- Glossodoris verrieri (Crosse, 1875): synonym of Goniobranchus verrieri (Crosse, 1875)
- Glossodoris vicina (Eliot, 1904): synonym of Goniobranchus tennentanus (Kelaart, 1859)
- Glossodoris victoriae Burn, 1957: synonym of Goniobranchus epicurius (Basedow & Hedley, 1905)
- Glossodoris webbi (d'Orbigny, 1839): synonym of Felimare picta (Schultz in Philippi, 1836)
- Glossodoris westraliensis O'Donoghue, 1924: synonym of Chromodoris westraliensis (O'Donoghue, 1924)
- Glossodoris xantholeuca (Ehrenberg, 1831): synonym of Glossodoris pallida (Rüppell & Leuckart, 1828)
- Glossodoris youngbleuthi (Kay & Young, 1969): synonym of Glossodoris rufomarginata (Bergh, 1890)
- Glossodoris zebra: synonym of Felimare zebra
