= Chromodoris aila =

Scientific classification
- Kingdom: Animalia
- Phylum: Mollusca
- Class: Gastropoda
- Order: Nudibranchia
- Family: Chromodorididae
- Genus: Chromodoris
- Species: C. aila

Binomial name
- Chromodoris aila Er. Marcus, 1961

Species of gastropod

Chromodoris aila is a species of colourful sea slug, a dorid nudibranch, a marine gastropod mollusk in the family Chromodorididae.

== Distribution ==
This species was described from Beaufort, North Carolina, United States. It has not been reported since.

== Description ==
Chromodoris aila is most likely to be a species of Felimare as Marcus describes it as similar to Chromodoris moerchii.
