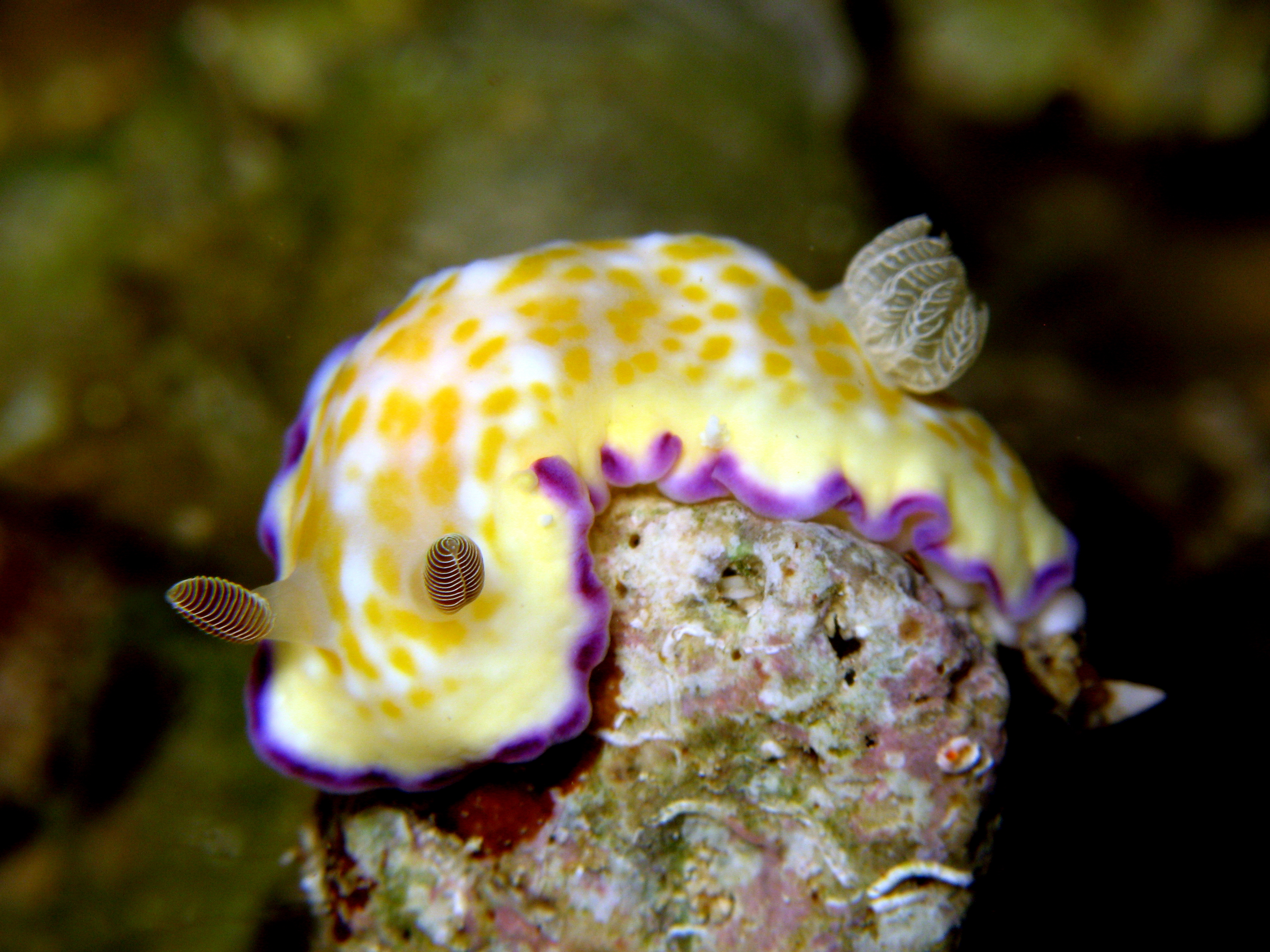

Scientific classification
- Kingdom: Animalia
- Phylum: Mollusca
- Class: Gastropoda
- Order: Nudibranchia
- Family: Chromodorididae
- Genus: Goniobranchus
- Species: G. rufomaculatus

Binomial name
- Goniobranchus rufomaculatus (Pease, 1871)

Synonyms
- Chromodoris histrio Bergh, 1877; Chromodoris rufomaculata Pease, 1871 (basionym); Glossodoris rufomaculata (Pease, 1871)

= Goniobranchus rufomaculatus =

Species of gastropod

Goniobranchus rufomaculatus is a species of colourful sea slug, a dorid nudibranch, a marine gastropod mollusc in the family Chromodorididae.

== Distribution ==
This species was described from Huahine, Society Islands. It has been reported from the Marshall Islands, Queensland and the Philippines.

== Description ==
The original description included the following colour information: "Colour cream white, passing into cream yellow towards the margins, which are ornamented with a series of oblong violet spots. The central portion of the mantle is studded with numerous slightly elevated orange dots. Branchiae colourless, tentacles chocolate brown, laminae white. Under surface colourless, with the exception of a light tinge of the dorsal colours, which are transmitted through the pellucid mantle."

== Similar species ==
This species may be conspecific with Goniobranchus albopustulosus. It is similar in colour to the Indian Ocean species Goniobranchus alius and Goniobranchus aureopurpureus from the central Indo-West-Pacific region.
