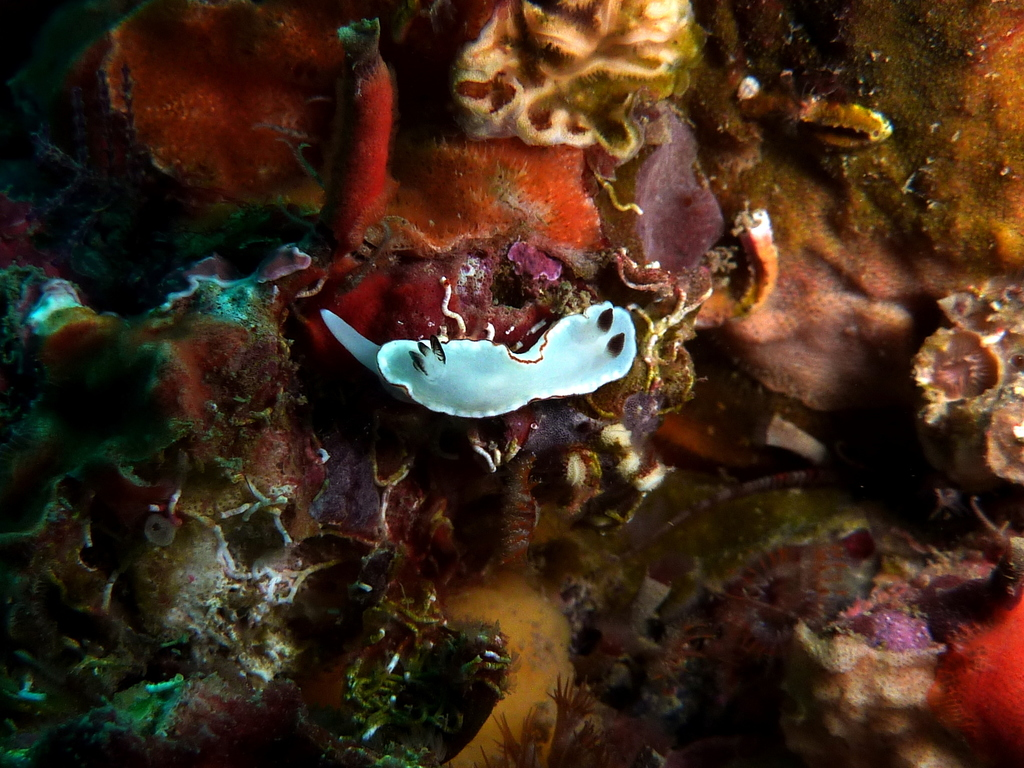

Scientific classification
- Kingdom: Animalia
- Phylum: Mollusca
- Class: Gastropoda
- Order: Nudibranchia
- Family: Chromodorididae
- Genus: Glossodoris
- Species: G. angasi

Binomial name
- Glossodoris angasi Rudman, 1986

= Glossodoris angasi =

Species of gastropod

Glossodoris angasi is a species of sea slug, a dorid nudibranch, a shell-less marine gastropod mollusk in the family Chromodorididae.

== Distribution ==
This species is found only in New South Wales, Australia.
