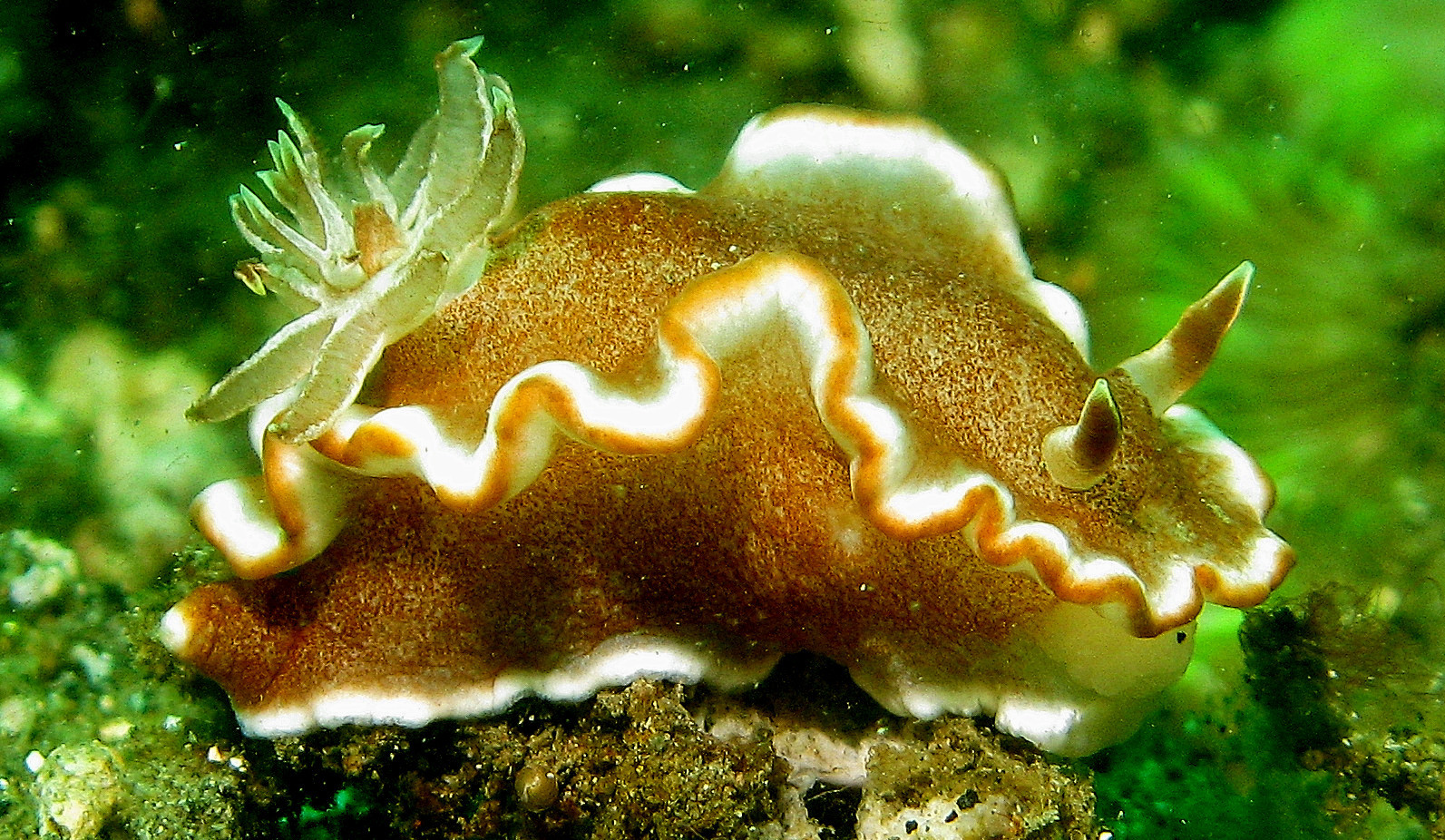
- Glossodoris rufomarginata

Scientific classification
- Kingdom: Animalia
- Phylum: Mollusca
- Class: Gastropoda
- Order: Nudibranchia
- Family: Chromodorididae
- Genus: Glossodoris
- Species: G. rufomarginata

Binomial name
- Glossodoris rufomarginata (Bergh, 1890)

= Glossodoris rufomarginata =

Species of gastropod

Glossodoris rufomarginata, commonly called white-margin sea slug or caramel nudibranch, is a species of colourful sea slug, a dorid nudibranch, a marine gastropod mollusc in the family Chromodorididae.

== Description ==
Glossodoris rufomarginata has a commonly observed length of 35 mm (1.4 in) with a maximum length of 50 mm (2.0 in). The background colouration of the entire body is whitish with the foot and the dorsal surface speckled with a dense coat of tiny red to orange-brown dots that give the impression at first glance that the animal is brown. The edge of the mantle is well developed and wavy with a broad white band with a red to orange-brown outer border. The foot has also a white external margin. The rhinophores and branchial plume are retractable with a red to orange-brown colouration, a white median line on the rhinophores and a white highlight on the gill axes.

== Distribution and habitat ==
This species occurs in the tropical waters of Indo-Pacific area. It has been reported from localities as far distant from one another as Tanzania in Africa and Mayotte in the Indian Ocean to the western Pacific Ocean. It occurs mainly from Sri Lanka to Polynesia and Hawaii., This nudibranch can be observed mostly on reef and rocky areas in sheltered or in exposed environments but with a preference for areas in the shade.

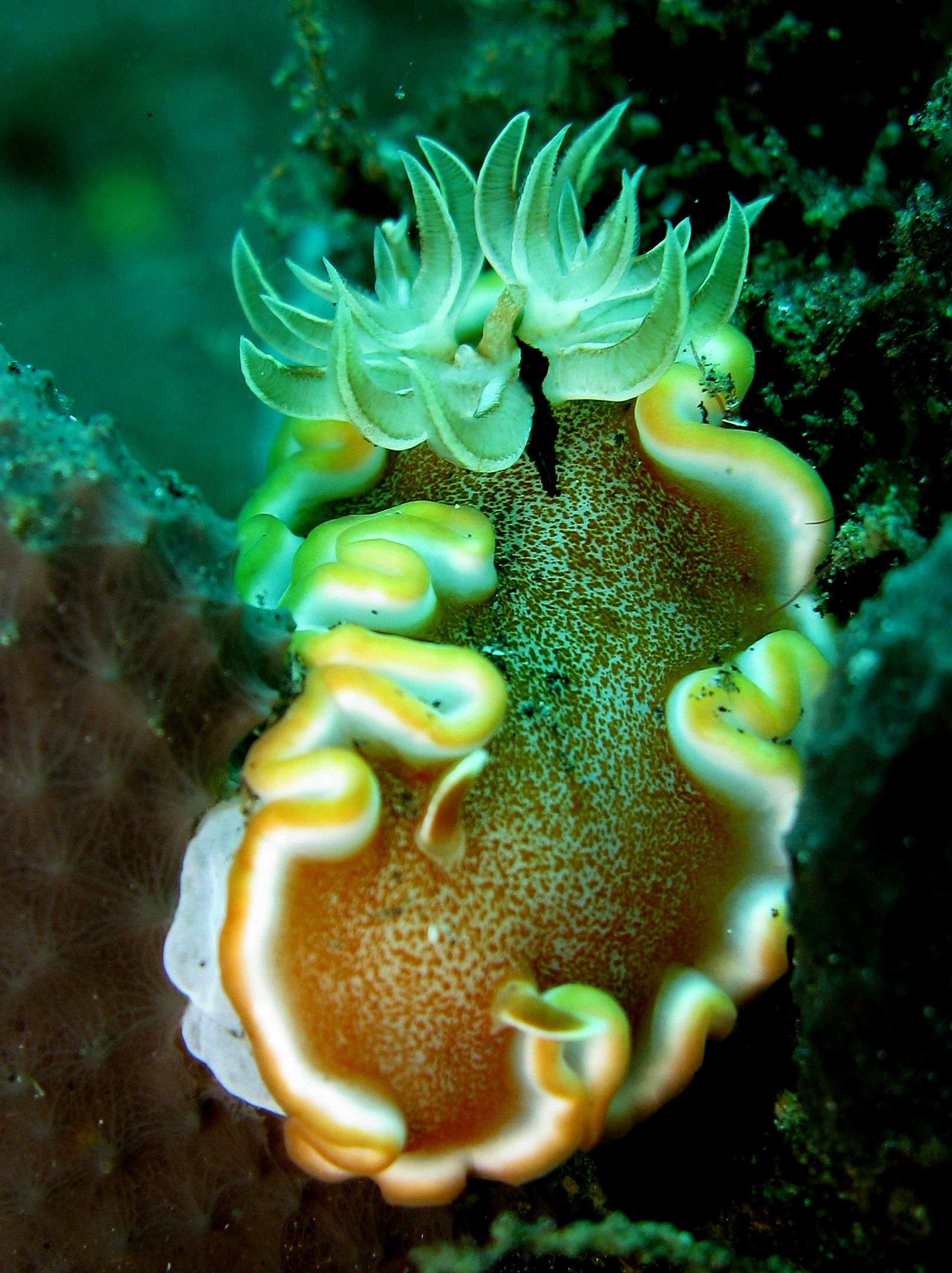
Glossodoris rufomarginata

== Biology ==
Glossodoris rufomarginata is active in the daytime and can be easily met on or near its favourite food source which are some black sponges of the family Thorectidae,
