= Glossodoris xishaensis =

Scientific classification
- Domain: Eukaryota
- Kingdom: Animalia
- Phylum: Mollusca
- Class: Gastropoda
- Order: Nudibranchia
- Family: Chromodorididae
- Genus: Glossodoris
- Species: G. xishaensis

Binomial name
- Glossodoris xishaensis Lin, 1975

Species of gastropod

Glossodoris xishaensis is a species of sea slug, a dorid nudibranch, a marine gastropod mollusc in the family Chromodorididae.

== Distribution ==
This species was described from the Xisha Islands, China.
