= Glossodoris thalassopora =

Scientific classification
- Kingdom: Animalia
- Phylum: Mollusca
- Class: Gastropoda
- Order: Nudibranchia
- Family: Chromodorididae
- Genus: Glossodoris
- Species: G. thalassopora

Binomial name
- Glossodoris thalassopora (Bergh, 1879)

Synonyms
- Chromodoris thalassopora Bergh, 1879

Species of gastropod

Glossodoris thalassopora is a species of sea slug, a dorid nudibranch, a marine gastropod mollusc in the family Chromodorididae.

== Distribution ==
This species was described from Japan.
