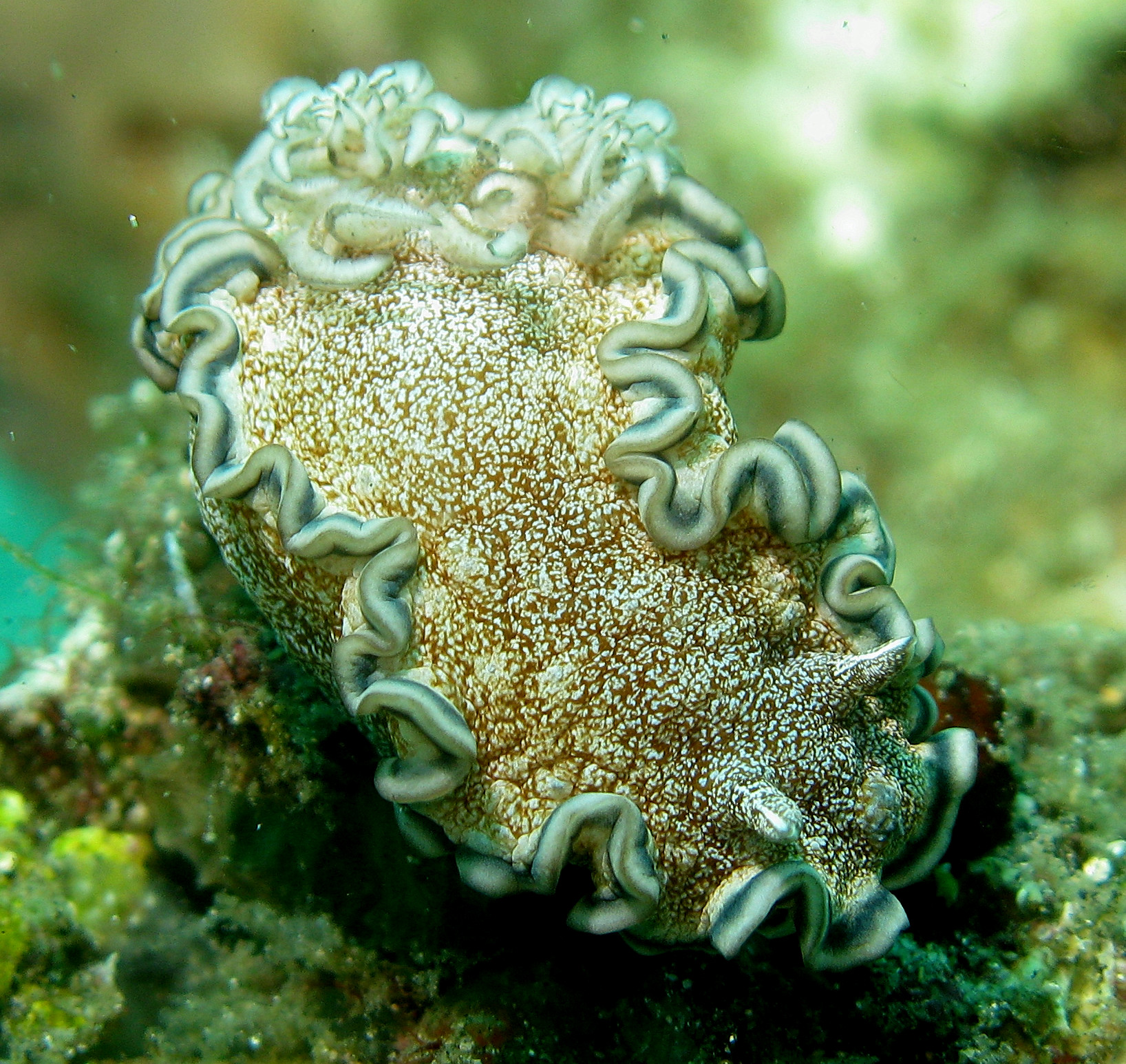

Scientific classification
- Kingdom: Animalia
- Phylum: Mollusca
- Class: Gastropoda
- Order: Nudibranchia
- Family: Chromodorididae
- Genus: Glossodoris
- Species: G. hikuerensis

Binomial name
- Glossodoris hikuerensis Pruvot-Fol, 1954

= Glossodoris hikuerensis =

Species of gastropod

Glossodoris hikuerensis, is a species of sea slug, a colorful nudibranch, a marine gastropod mollusc in the family Chromodorididae.

== Distribution ==
This species occurs in the tropical Indo-Pacific Ocean. It has been observed in localities as far apart as East Africa in the Indian Ocean to French Polynesia in the Pacific.

== Description ==
Glossodoris hikuerensis has a pale-brown body which is covered by speckled white dots. It has a very frilly mantle edged with brown-black-brown lines. Its gills are semi-translucent white, and its rhinophores have the same speckled pale-brown pattern as its body. Glossodoris hikuerensis is a relatively large nudibranch and can reach at least 100 mm in length.

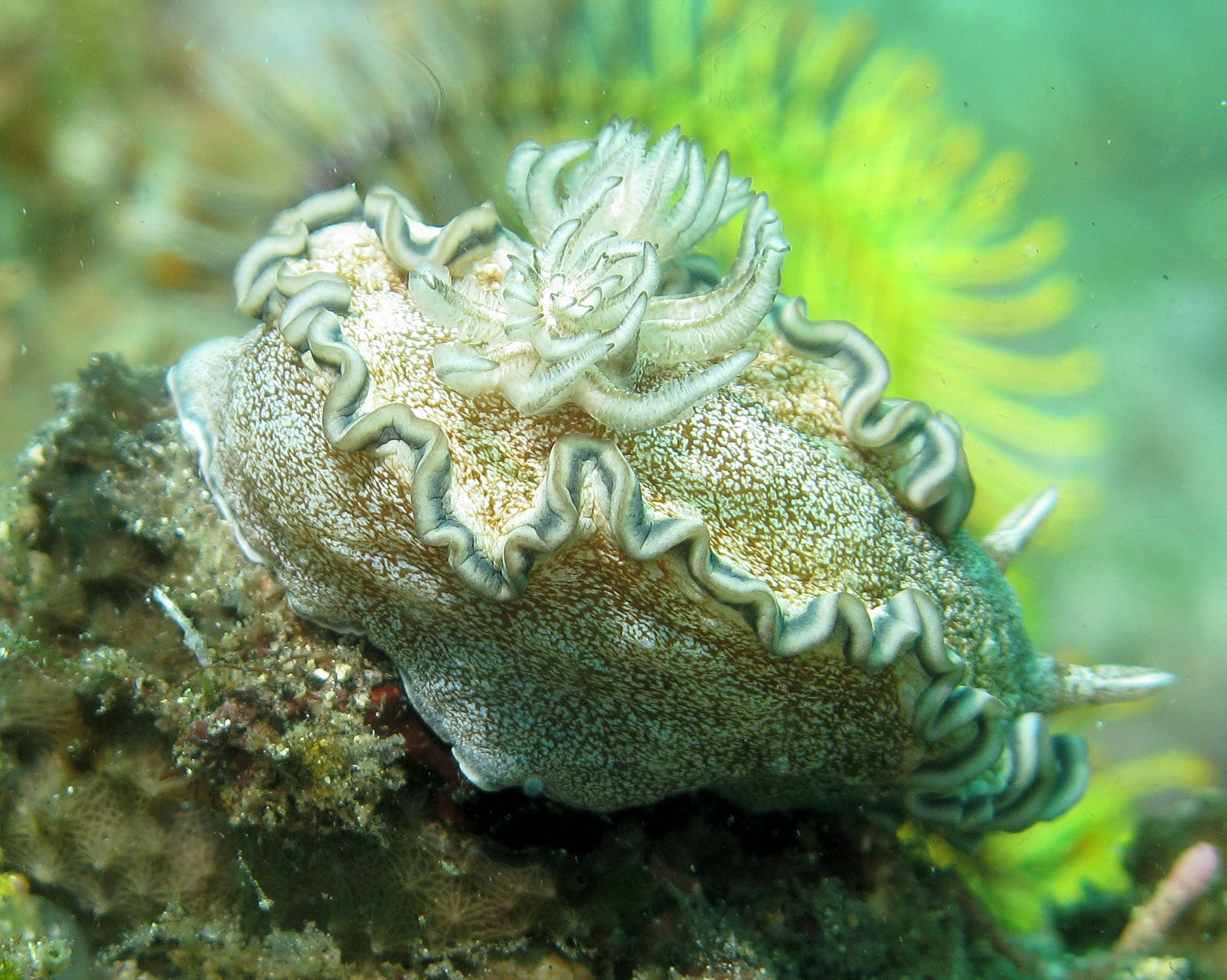
Glossodoris hikuerensis

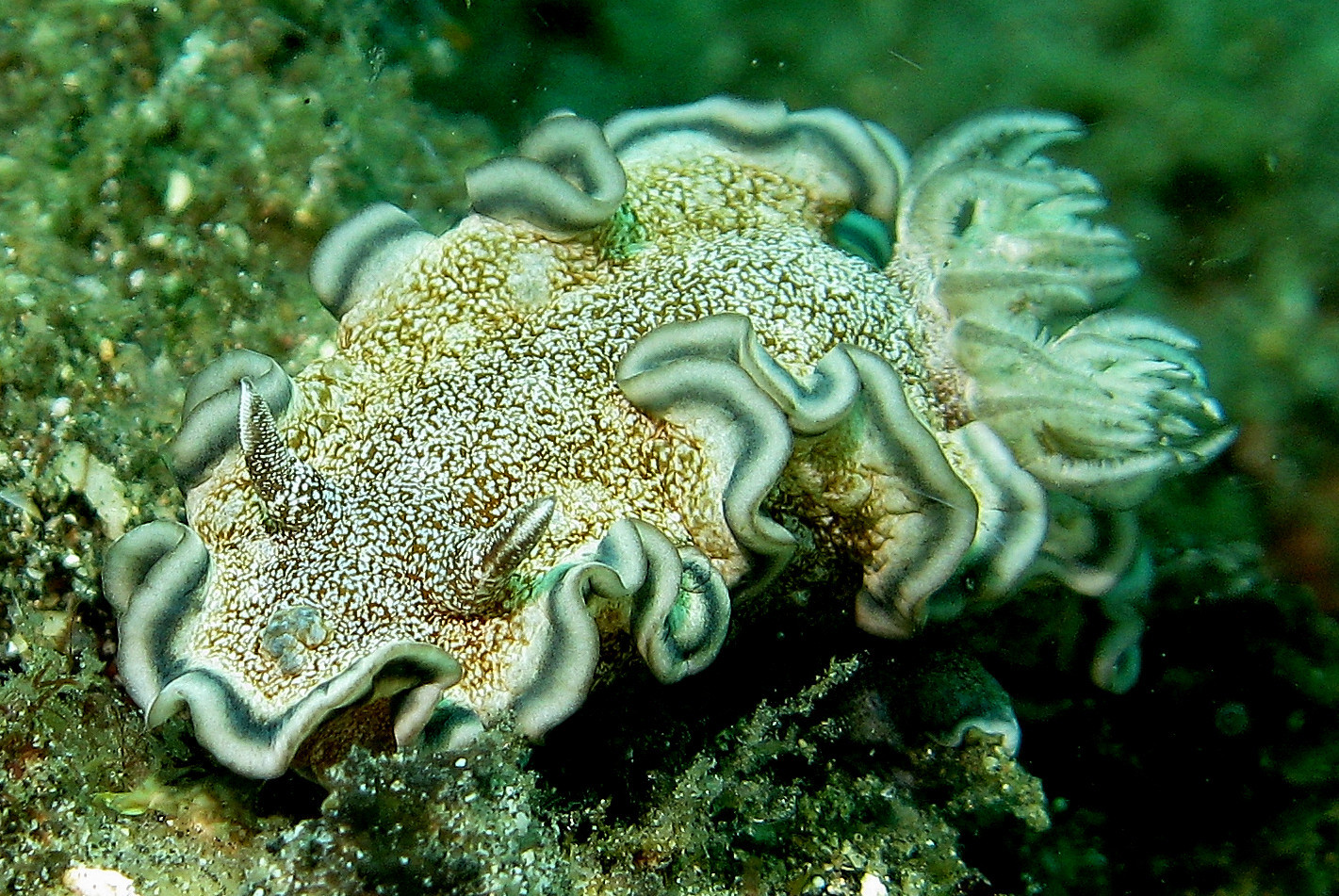
Glossodoris hikuerensis

== Ecology ==
This species, like many other nudibranchs, feeds on sponges. The only sponge identified as its food source is Hyrtios erectus. When disturbed, Glossodoris hikuerensis releases a milky-white substance which is a form of chemical defence.
