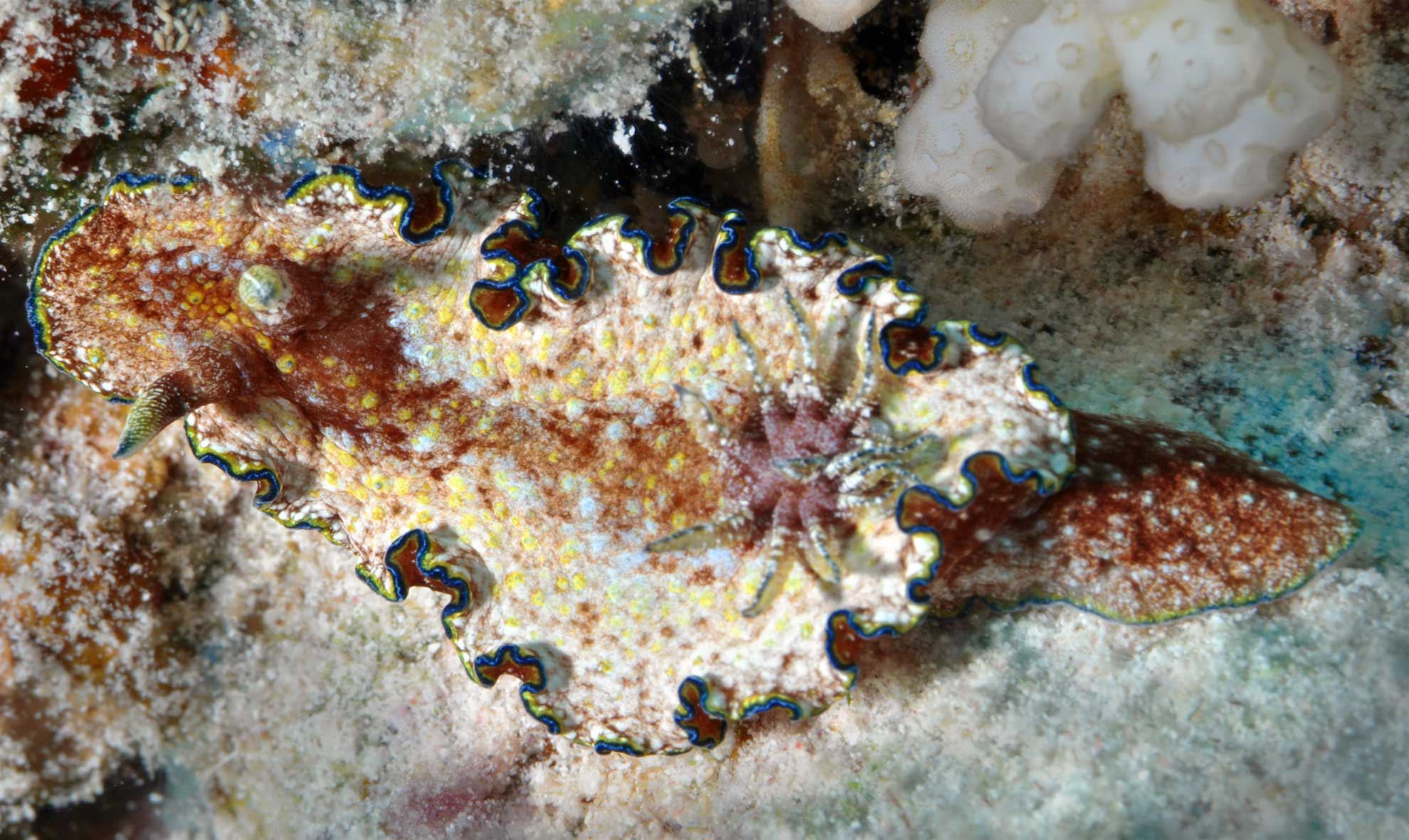
- Egypt, Red Sea.

Scientific classification
- Kingdom: Animalia
- Phylum: Mollusca
- Class: Gastropoda
- Order: Nudibranchia
- Family: Chromodorididae
- Genus: Glossodoris
- Species: G. andersonae

Binomial name
- Glossodoris andersonae Matsuda & Gosliner, 2018

= Glossodoris andersonae =

Species of gastropod

Glossodoris andersonae is a species of sea slug, a dorid nudibranch, a shell-less marine gastropod mollusk in the family Chromodorididae.

== Distribution ==
The type locality for this species is Abulad Islands, Saudi Arabia, Red Sea, 16.796°N 42.199°E.

== Description ==
Previously confused with Glossodoris cincta this species is distinguished by details of colouring and internal anatomy as well as DNA sequences from other species of very similar appearance.
