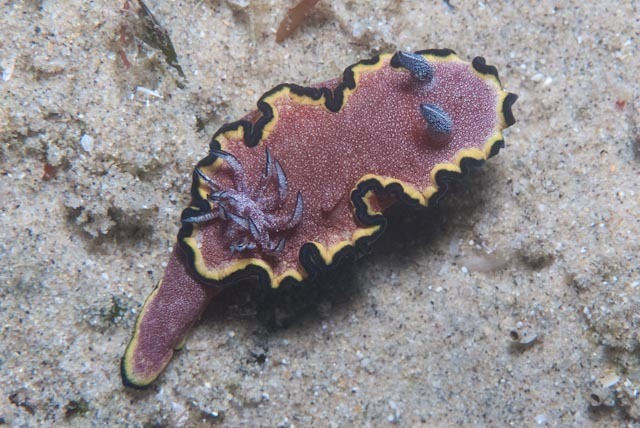

Scientific classification
- Kingdom: Animalia
- Phylum: Mollusca
- Class: Gastropoda
- Order: Nudibranchia
- Family: Chromodorididae
- Genus: Glossodoris
- Species: G. bonwanga

Binomial name
- Glossodoris bonwanga Matsuda & Gosliner, 2018

= Glossodoris bonwanga =

Species of gastropod

Glossodoris bonwanga is a species of sea slug, a dorid nudibranch, a shell-less marine gastropod mollusk in the family Chromodorididae.

== Distribution ==
The type locality for species is Pointe Evatra, Madagascar, Indian Ocean, 24.9869°S 47.1005°E. It was also collected at Iles Radama, Madagascar and Sodwana Bay, South Africa.

== Description ==
Previously confused with Glossodoris cincta this species is distinguished by details of colouring and internal anatomy as well as DNA sequences from other species of very similar appearance.
