= Glossodoris kophos =

Scientific classification
- Kingdom: Animalia
- Phylum: Mollusca
- Class: Gastropoda
- Order: Nudibranchia
- Family: Chromodorididae
- Genus: Glossodoris
- Species: G. kophos

Binomial name
- Glossodoris kophos Yonow, 2001

Species of gastropod

Glossodoris kophos is a species of sea slug, a dorid nudibranch, a shell-less marine gastropod mollusk in the family Chromodorididae.

== Distribution ==
The type locality for this species is Laha, Ambon Island, Indonesia, 3.70580°S 128.10306°E.
