= Glossodoris katoi =

Scientific classification
- Kingdom: Animalia
- Phylum: Mollusca
- Class: Gastropoda
- Order: Nudibranchia
- Family: Chromodorididae
- Genus: Glossodoris
- Species: G. katoi

Binomial name
- Glossodoris katoi Baba, 1938

Species of gastropod

Glossodoris katoi is a species of sea slug, a dorid nudibranch, a shell-less marine gastropod mollusk in the family Chromodorididae.

== Distribution ==
The type locality for this species is Izu Peninsula, Middle Japan.
