= Glossodoris erythraea =

Scientific classification
- Kingdom: Animalia
- Phylum: Mollusca
- Class: Gastropoda
- Order: Nudibranchia
- Family: Chromodorididae
- Genus: Glossodoris
- Species: G. erythraea

Binomial name
- Glossodoris erythraea (Ehrenberg, 1831)

Synonyms
- Doris (Glossodoris) erythraea Ehrenberg, 1831

Species of gastropod

Glossodoris erythraea is a species of sea slug, a dorid nudibranch, a shell-less marine gastropod mollusk in the family Chromodorididae.

== Distribution ==
The type locality for this species is Sanafer, Straits of Tiran, Red Sea.

== Description ==
Rudman, 1983, states "This species from the Red Sea was described as pale yellowish with the foot, mantle and gills margined with purple and with purple spots on the dorsum. There was no accompanying illustration and Bergh (1887) was unable to find any specimens amongst Ehrenberg’s material. It is not possible to associate this species with any known species from the Red Sea."
