= Glossodoris souverbiei =

Scientific classification
- Kingdom: Animalia
- Phylum: Mollusca
- Class: Gastropoda
- Order: Nudibranchia
- Family: Chromodorididae
- Genus: Glossodoris
- Species: G. souverbiei

Binomial name
- Glossodoris souverbiei (Crosse, 1875)

Synonyms
- Goniodoris souverbiei Crosse, 1875

Species of gastropod

Glossodoris souverbiei is a species of sea slug in the family Chromodorididae.

== Distribution ==
This species was described from Nouméa, New Caledonia.
