= Glossodoris lamberti =

Scientific classification
- Kingdom: Animalia
- Phylum: Mollusca
- Class: Gastropoda
- Order: Nudibranchia
- Family: Chromodorididae
- Genus: Glossodoris
- Species: G. lamberti

Binomial name
- Glossodoris lamberti (Crosse, 1875)

Synonyms
- Goniodoris lamberti Crosse, 1875

Species of gastropod

Glossodoris lamberti is a species of sea slug, a dorid nudibranch, a shell-less marine gastropod mollusk in the family Chromodorididae.

== Distribution ==
The type locality for this species is Nouméa, New Caledonia, 22.2758°S 166.458°E.
