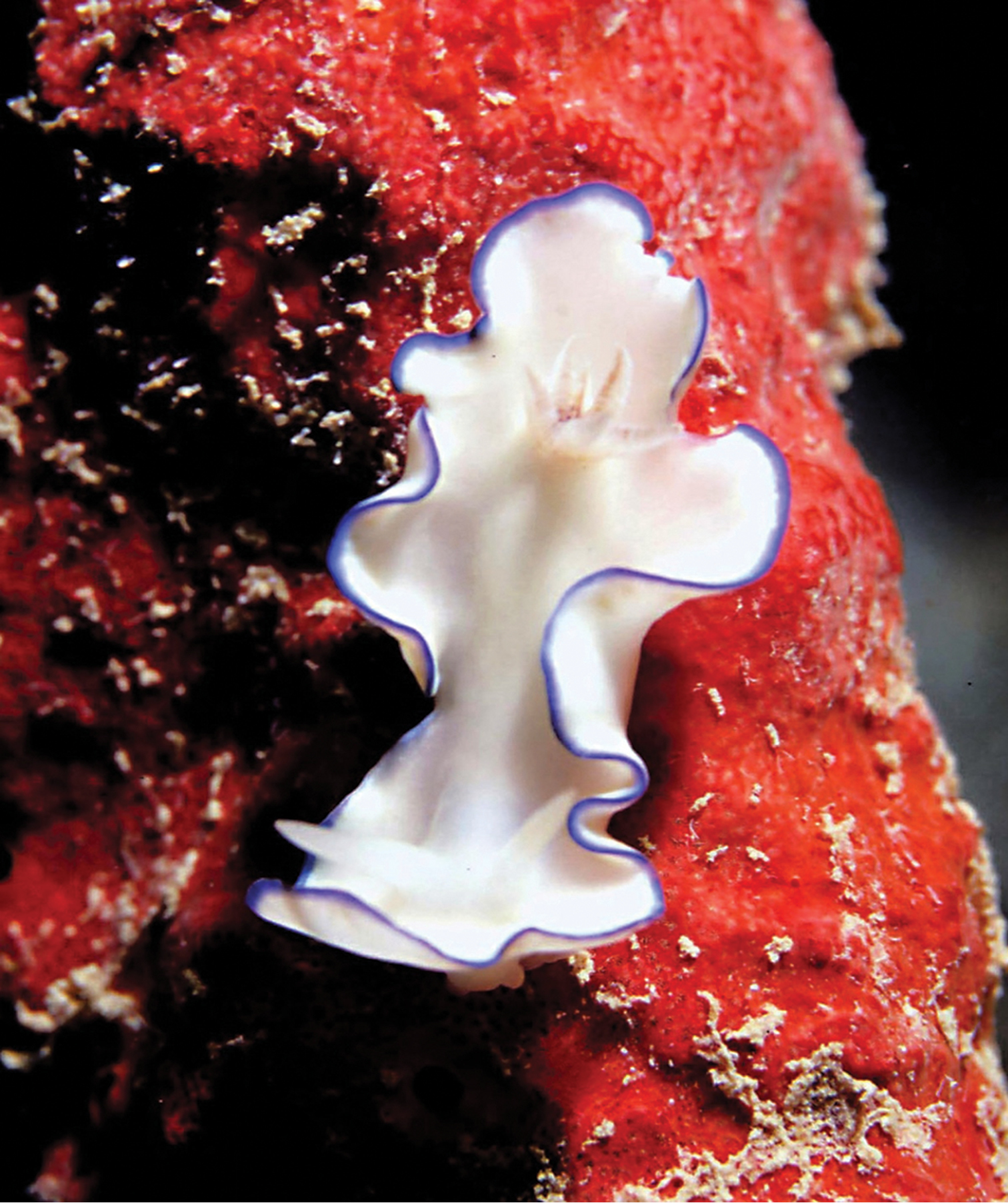

Scientific classification
- Kingdom: Animalia
- Phylum: Mollusca
- Class: Gastropoda
- Order: Nudibranchia
- Family: Chromodorididae
- Genus: Glossodoris
- Species: G. kahlbrocki

Binomial name
- Glossodoris kahlbrocki Yonow, 2018

= Glossodoris kahlbrocki =

Species of gastropod

Glossodoris kahlbrocki is a species of sea slug, a dorid nudibranch, a shell-less marine gastropod mollusk in the family Chromodorididae.

== Distribution ==
The type locality for this species is Dahara Wadi Gimal, near Hurghada, Egypt, Red Sea.

== Description ==
This distinctive species has a white body with a narrow bright blue rim to the mantle which grades to dark blue at the edge. The rhinophores and gills are also white, with the inner faces of the gills ochre.
