= Glossodoris pantherina =

Scientific classification
- Kingdom: Animalia
- Phylum: Mollusca
- Class: Gastropoda
- Order: Nudibranchia
- Family: Chromodorididae
- Genus: Glossodoris
- Species: G. pantherina

Binomial name
- Glossodoris pantherina (Bergh, 1905)

Synonyms
- Chromodoris pantherina Bergh, 1905

Species of gastropod

Glossodoris pantherina is a species of sea slug, a dorid nudibranch and a shell-less marine gastropod mollusk belonging to the family Chromodorididae.

== Distribution ==
This species was first discovered in Pulu Jedan on the east coast of the Aru Islands, Indonesia. It inhabits tropical waters in the Indo-Pacific.
