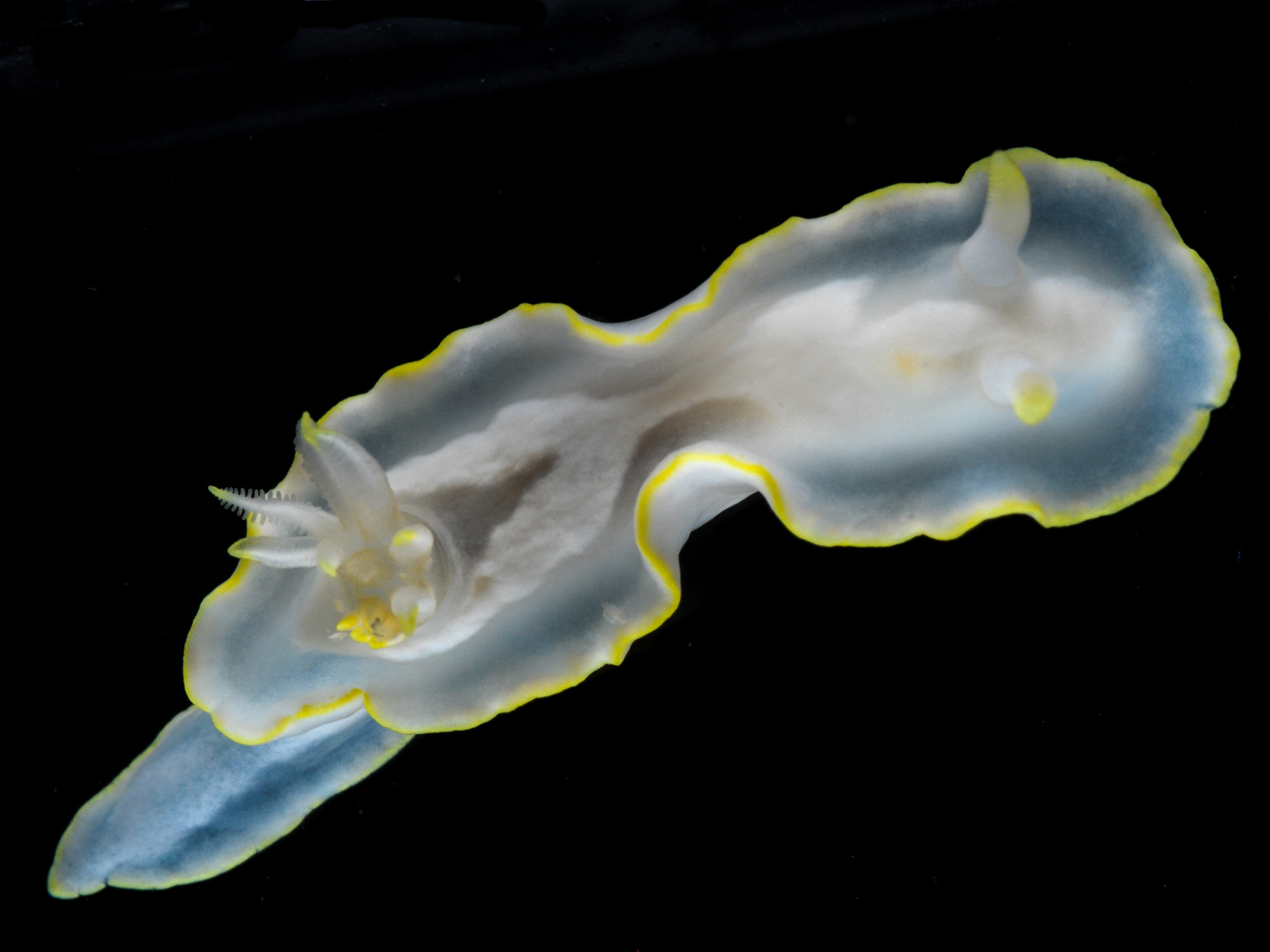
- Dani Beach, Kenya

Scientific classification
- Kingdom: Animalia
- Phylum: Mollusca
- Class: Gastropoda
- Order: Nudibranchia
- Family: Chromodorididae
- Genus: Glossodoris
- Species: G. pallida

Binomial name
- Glossodoris pallida Ruppell & Leuckart, 1828

= Glossodoris pallida =

Species of gastropod

Glossodoris pallida is a species of a nudibranch, a marine gastropod mollusc in the family Chromodorididae.

== Distribution ==
This species was described from the Red Sea. It occurs in the tropical Indian Ocean including the African coast and Madagascar. It is apparently replaced by Glossodoris buko in the central Indo-Pacific Ocean.

== Description ==
Glossodoris pallida is semi-translucent-white all over with a thin yellow-margined mantle. It also has opaque white patches on its upper mantle. Both its gills and rhinophores are also white.

== Ecology ==
This species, like many other nudibranchs, feeds on sponges. It has also been seen feeding on grey-black sponges from the genus Cacospongia.

Glossodoris pallida, like other Chromodorid nudibranchs, stores chemicals it gains from the sponges it eats within its body. These chemicals are unpalatable to fish and other creatures, making the nudibranch much less likely to be eaten.
