= Glossodoris aeruginosa =

Scientific classification
- Kingdom: Animalia
- Phylum: Mollusca
- Class: Gastropoda
- Order: Nudibranchia
- Family: Chromodorididae
- Genus: Glossodoris
- Species: G. aeruginosa

Binomial name
- Glossodoris aeruginosa Rudman, 1995

Species of gastropod

Glossodoris aeruginosa is a species of sea slug, a dorid nudibranch, a shell-less marine gastropod mollusk in the family Chromodorididae.

== Distribution ==
This species is found in the seas around eastern Australia and New Caledonia.
