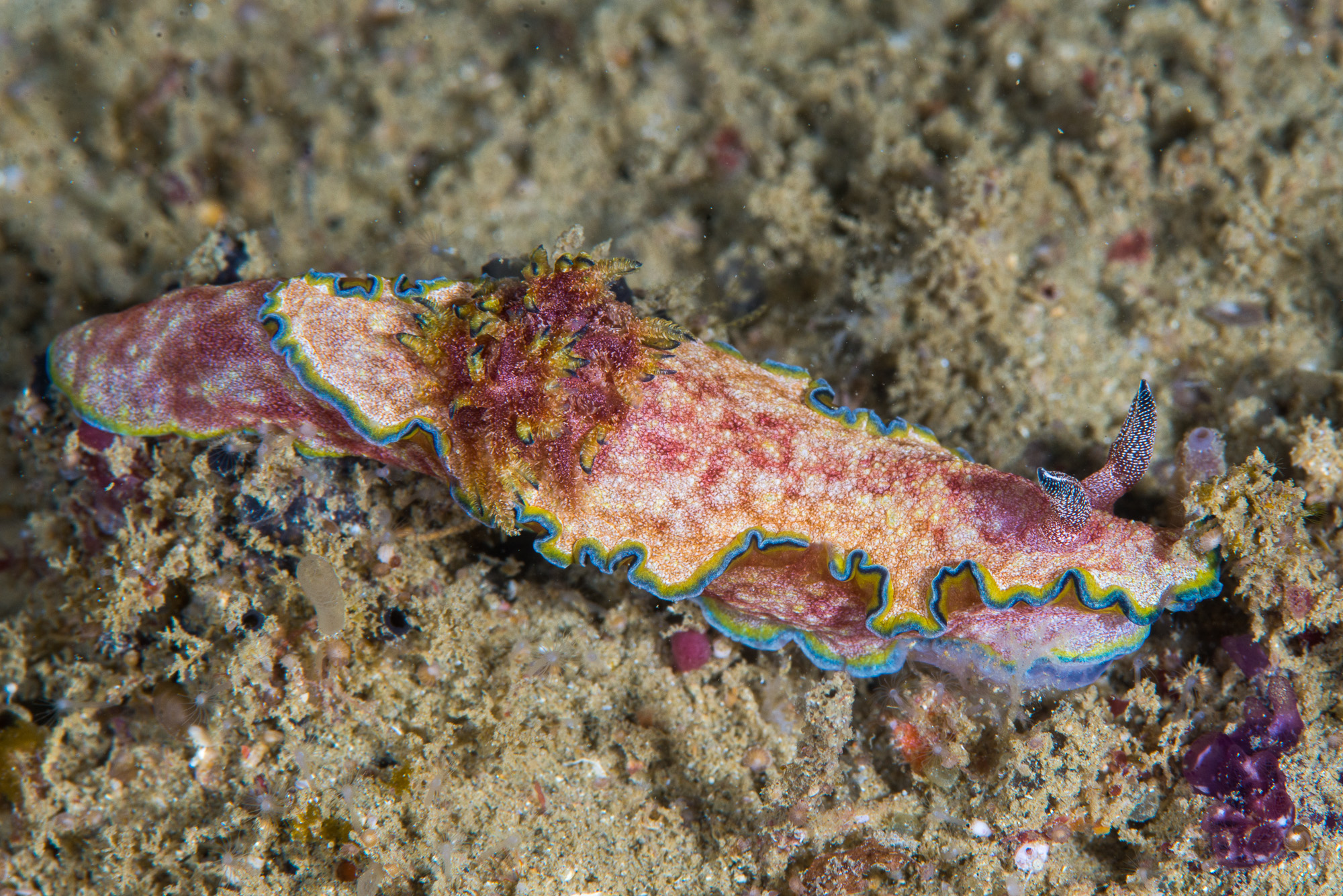
- Unawatuna, Galle, Sri Lanka.

Scientific classification
- Kingdom: Animalia
- Phylum: Mollusca
- Class: Gastropoda
- Order: Nudibranchia
- Family: Chromodorididae
- Genus: Glossodoris
- Species: G. acosti

Binomial name
- Glossodoris acosti Matsuda & Gosliner, 2018

= Glossodoris acosti =

Species of gastropod

Glossodoris acosti is a species of sea slug, a dorid nudibranch, a shell-less marine gastropod mollusk in the family Chromodorididae.

== Distribution ==
The type locality for species is Rempi, Madang Province, Papua New Guinea. Paratypes from the Philippines are included in the original description. Probably widespread in the central Indo-Pacific Ocean.

== Description ==
Previously confused with Glossodoris cincta this species is distinguished by details of colouring and internal anatomy as well as DNA sequences from other species of very similar appearance.
