= Glossodoris semeion =

Scientific classification
- Domain: Eukaryota
- Kingdom: Animalia
- Phylum: Mollusca
- Class: Gastropoda
- Order: Nudibranchia
- Family: Chromodorididae
- Genus: Glossodoris
- Species: G. semeion

Binomial name
- Glossodoris semeion Winckworth, 1946

Species of gastropod

Glossodoris semeion is a species of colourful sea slug, a dorid nudibranch, a marine gastropod mollusc in the family Chromodorididae.

== Distribution ==
This species was described from Bombay, India.
