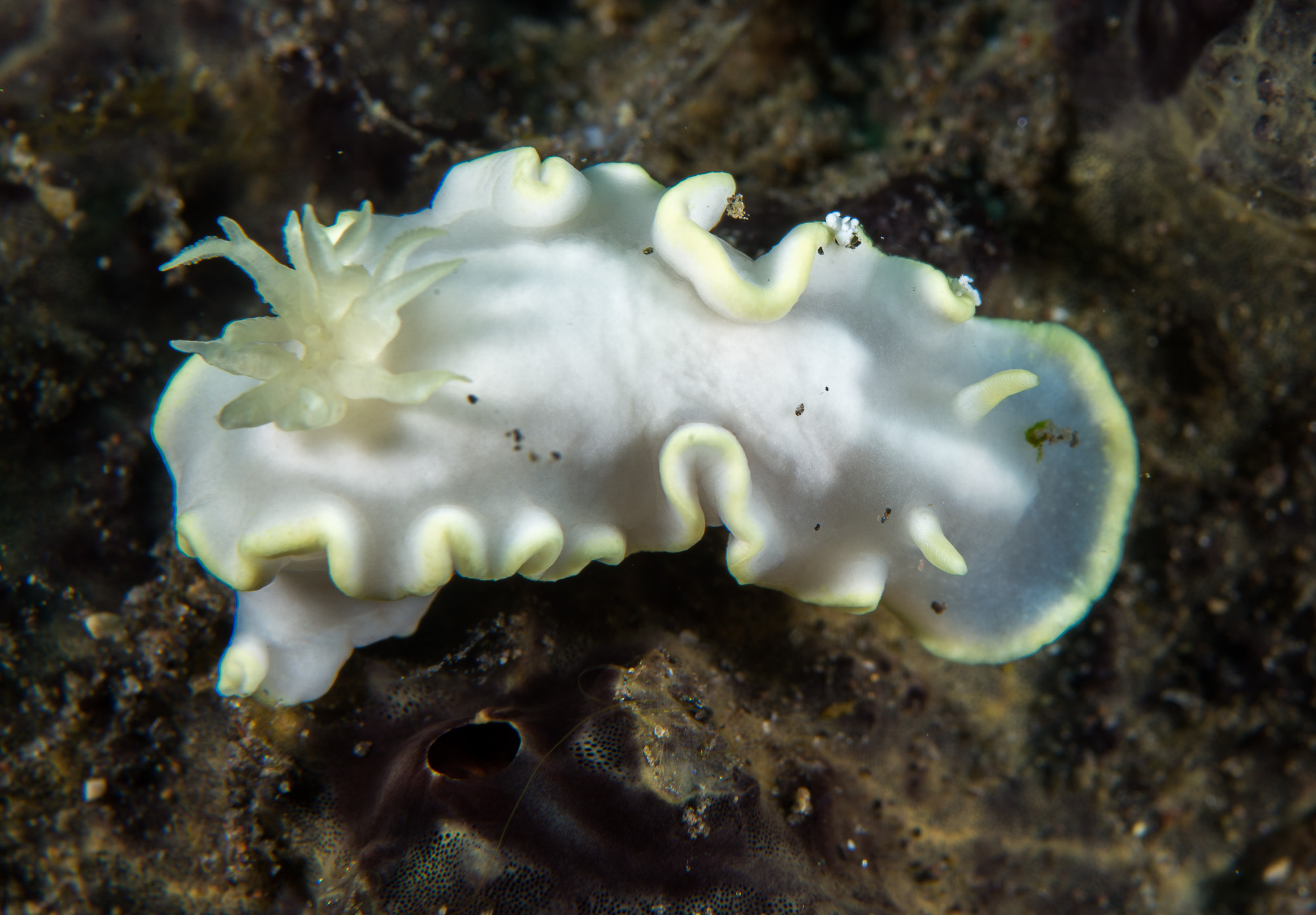
- Sangeang, Indonesia.

Scientific classification
- Kingdom: Animalia
- Phylum: Mollusca
- Class: Gastropoda
- Order: Nudibranchia
- Family: Chromodorididae
- Genus: Glossodoris
- Species: G. buko

Binomial name
- Glossodoris buko Matsuda & Gosliner, 2018

= Glossodoris buko =

Species of gastropod

Glossodoris buko is a species of sea slug, a dorid nudibranch, a shell-less marine gastropod mollusk in the family Chromodorididae.

== Distribution ==
The type locality for species is Bilbil Island, Madang Province, Papua New Guinea, 5.2963°S 145.7811°E. It was also collected at Bohol Island and Luzon Island, Philippines.

== Description ==
Previously confused with Glossodoris pallida this species is distinguished by details of colouring and internal anatomy as well as DNA sequences from other species of very similar appearance.
