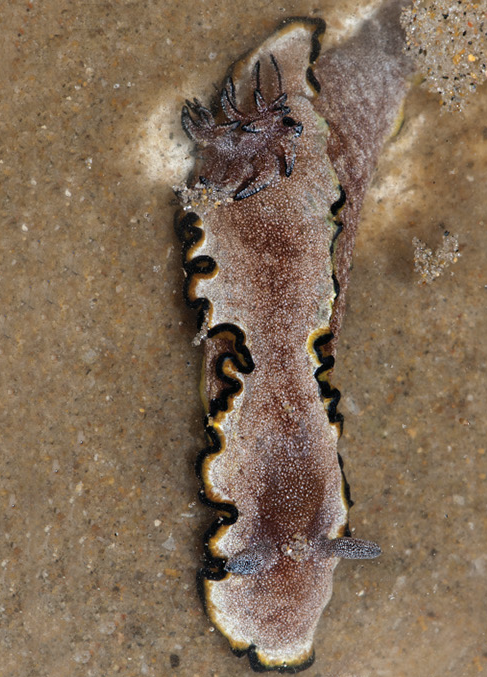

Scientific classification
- Kingdom: Animalia
- Phylum: Mollusca
- Class: Gastropoda
- Order: Nudibranchia
- Family: Chromodorididae
- Genus: Glossodoris
- Species: G. gregorius

Binomial name
- Glossodoris gregorius Rudman, 1986

= Glossodoris gregorius =

Species of gastropod

Glossodoris gregorius is a species of sea slug, a dorid nudibranch, a shell-less marine gastropod mollusk in the family Chromodorididae.

== Distribution ==
This species is found only in Tanzania, in the Eastern Indian Ocean.
