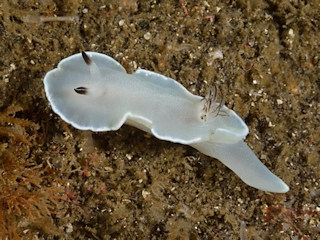

Scientific classification
- Kingdom: Animalia
- Phylum: Mollusca
- Class: Gastropoda
- Order: Nudibranchia
- Family: Chromodorididae
- Genus: Glossodoris
- Species: G. misakinosibogae

Binomial name
- Glossodoris misakinosibogae Baba, 1988

= Glossodoris misakinosibogae =

Species of gastropod

Glossodoris misakinosibogae is a species of sea slug, a dorid nudibranch, a shell-less marine gastropod mollusk in the family Chromodorididae.

== Distribution ==
This species is found in Japan.
