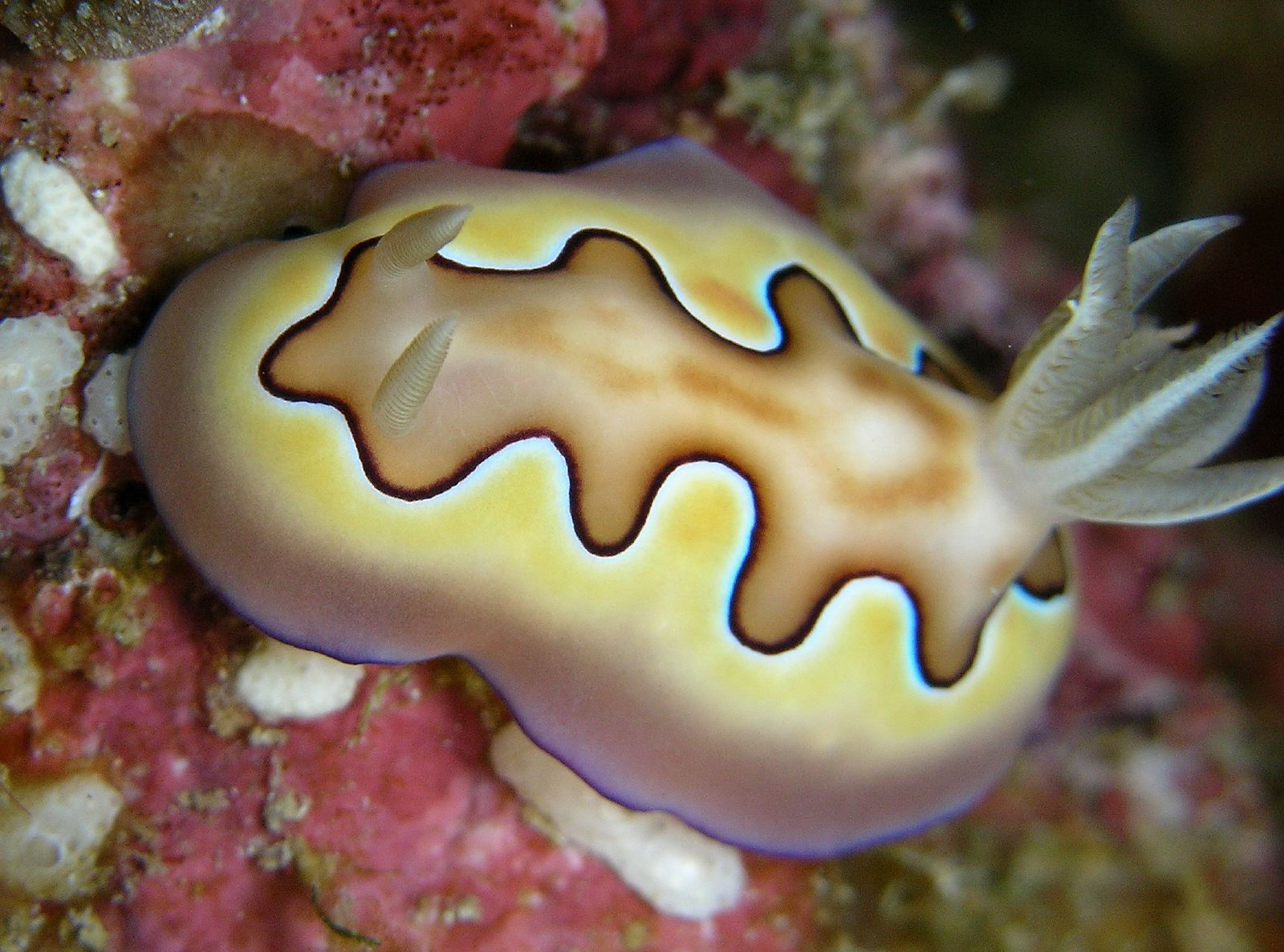
- Goniobranchus coi

Scientific classification
- Kingdom: Animalia
- Phylum: Mollusca
- Class: Gastropoda
- Order: Nudibranchia
- Family: Chromodorididae
- Genus: Goniobranchus
- Species: G. coi

Binomial name
- Goniobranchus coi (Risbec, 1956)

Synonyms
- Chromodoris coi (Risbec, 1956); Glossodoris coi Risbec, 1956 (basionym)

= Goniobranchus coi =

Species of gastropod

Goniobranchus coi is a species of very colourful sea slug, a dorid nudibranch, a marine gastropod mollusc in the family Chromodorididae.

== Distribution ==
This species was described from Vietnam. It occurs in the tropical Western Pacific Ocean from Australia to the Philippines and rarely as far East as the Marshall Islands.

== Description ==
Goniobranchus coi has a white body and foot, but is instantly recognizable by its distinct dorsal pattern. The outer part of the mantle is yellow, separated from the inner light-brown part by a wavy white and black line. The outer edge of the mantle is brown, with a thin purple line at the margin. The gills and rhinophores range in colour between different individuals from translucent white, through pale-yellow and light-brown. This species reaches at least 50 mm in length.

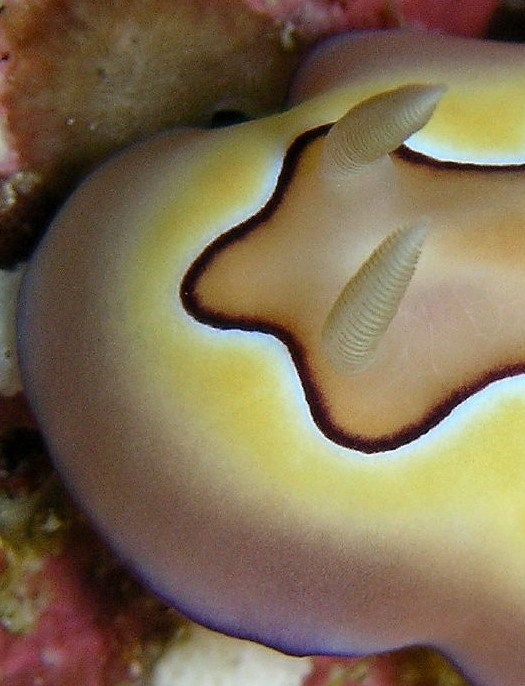
A close up of the rhinophores of G. coi

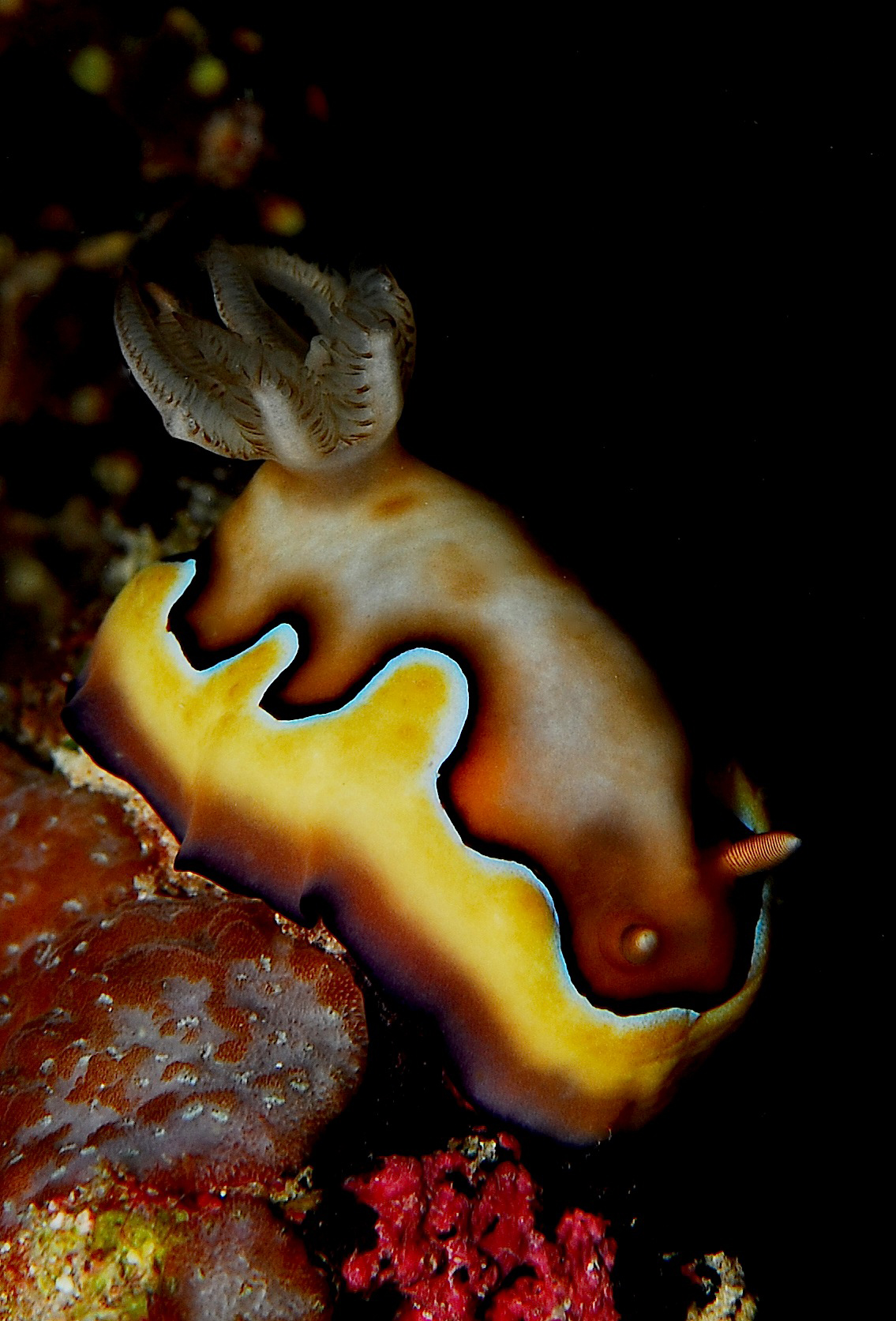
Goniobranchus coi

== Ecology ==
Like most sea slugs in the superfamily Doridoidea, Goniobranchus coi feeds on sponges. It has been seen feeding on the sponge Chelonaplysilla violacea.
