= Goniobranchus albomaculatus =

Scientific classification
- Kingdom: Animalia
- Phylum: Mollusca
- Class: Gastropoda
- Order: Nudibranchia
- Family: Chromodorididae
- Genus: Goniobranchus
- Species: G. albomaculatus

Binomial name
- Goniobranchus albomaculatus (Pease, 1866)

Synonyms
- Glossodoris albomaculata (Pease, 1866)

Species of gastropod

Goniobranchus albomaculatus is a species of sea slug, a dorid nudibranch, a marine gastropod mollusc in the family Chromodorididae.

== Distribution ==
This species was described from a locality given just as "Pacific Islands".

== Description ==
This chromodorid nudibranch was described as follows:

Colour orange-yellow, margin bright violet, shading off into the ground colour, tubercles whitish, cervical tentacles, branchiae, and under surface cream white. Length 2 inches.
