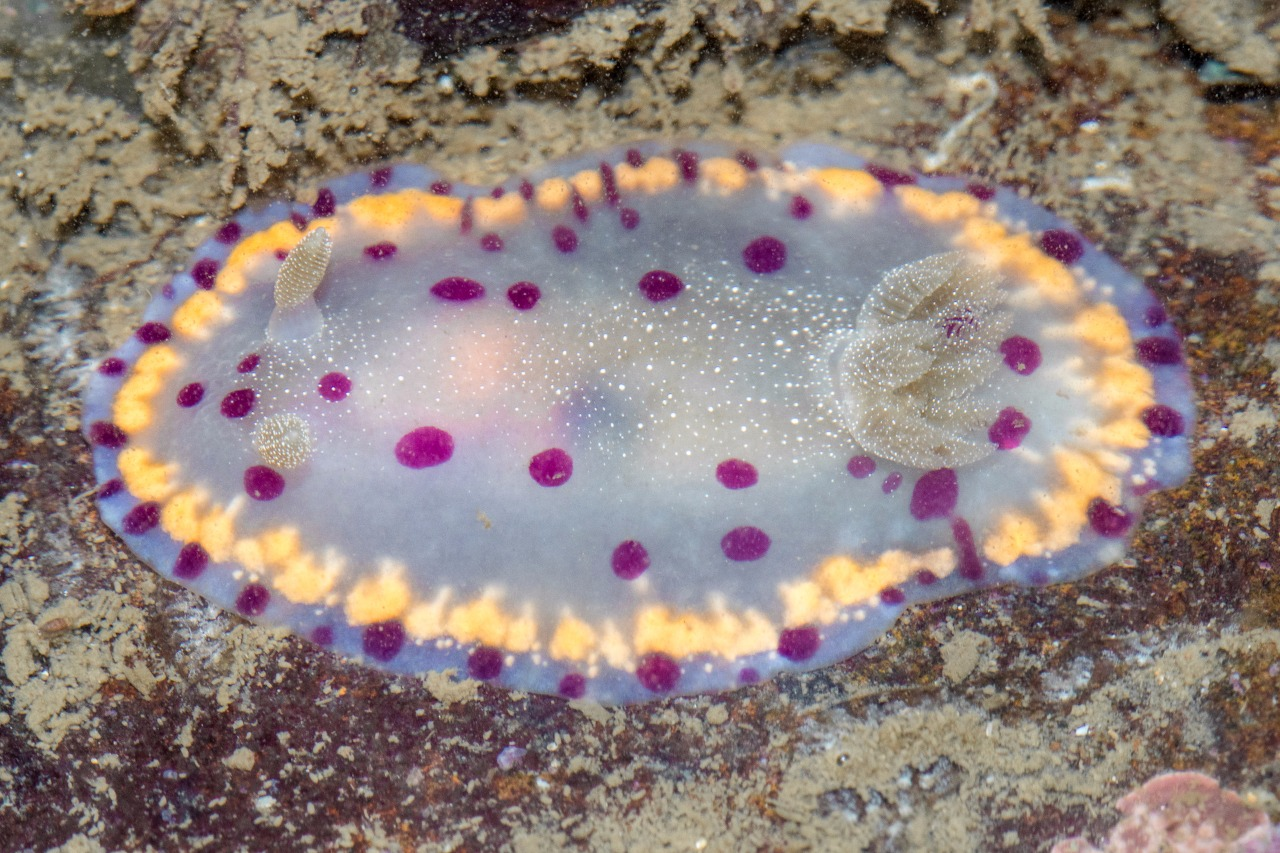
- Photographed in Mumbai in October 2018

Scientific classification
- Kingdom: Animalia
- Phylum: Mollusca
- Class: Gastropoda
- Order: Nudibranchia
- Family: Chromodorididae
- Genus: Goniobranchus
- Species: G. bombayanus

Binomial name
- Goniobranchus bombayanus (Winckworth, 1946)

Synonyms
- Glossodoris bombayana Winckworth, 1946; Chromodoris naiki (Valdes, Mollo, & Ortea, 1999)

= Goniobranchus bombayanus =

Species of gastropod

Goniobranchus bombayanus is a species of colourful sea slug, a dorid nudibranch, a marine gastropod mollusc in the family Chromodorididae.

== Distribution ==
This species was described from Bombay, India. It occurs in the Gulf of Bengal off northeast India and the Andaman Islands.

== Description ==
Goniobranchus bombayanus is a chromodorid nudibranch with a translucent white mantle with rounded purple spots and an orange submarginal band of coalescent spots. The centre of the back has a brownish hue and the surface is raised into tiny white papillae. The body reaches a length of 30 mm. It is very similar to Goniobranchus kitae.
