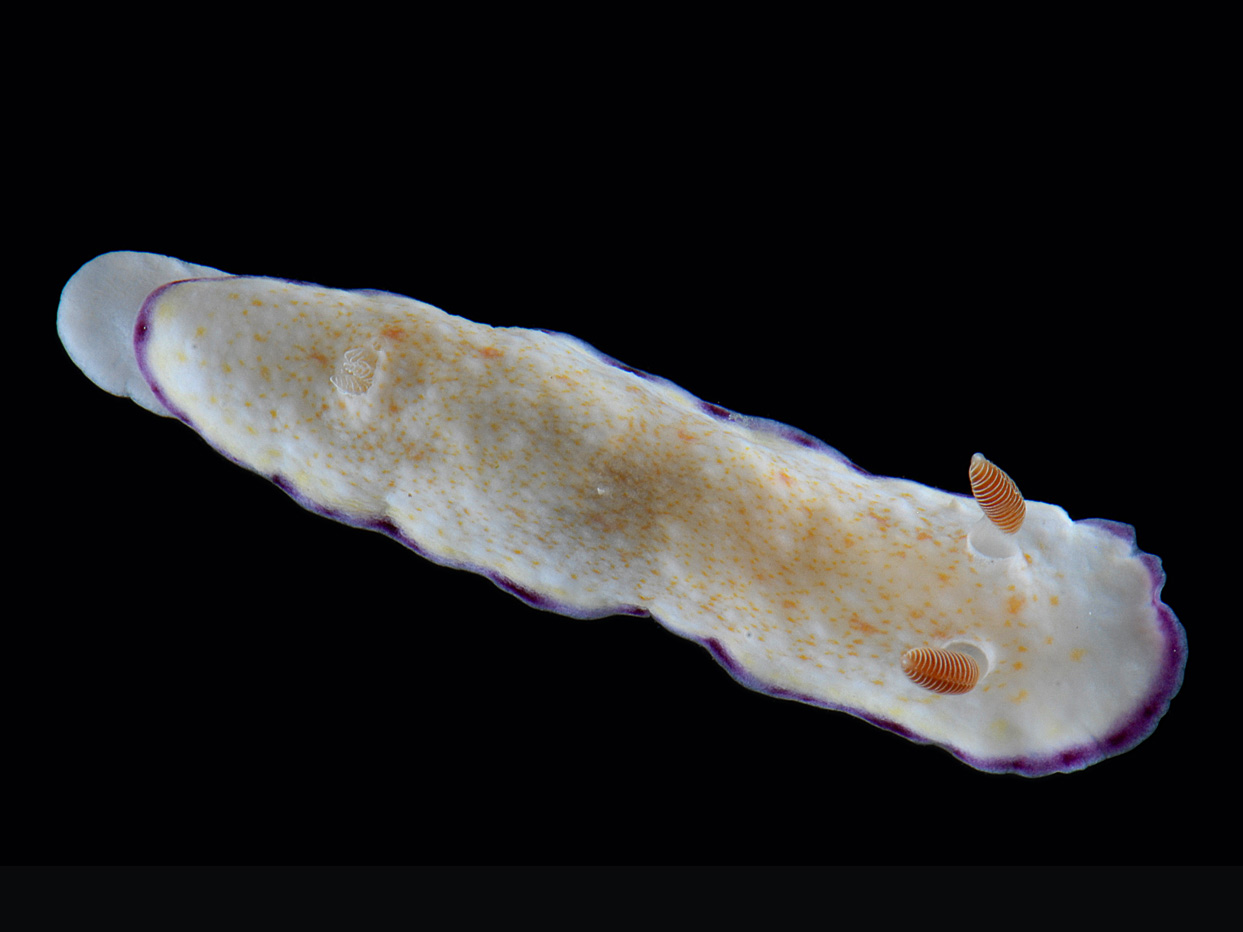
- The nudibranch Goniobranchus alius, Nomad, Diani, Kenya.

Scientific classification
- Kingdom: Animalia
- Phylum: Mollusca
- Class: Gastropoda
- Order: Nudibranchia
- Family: Chromodorididae
- Genus: Goniobranchus
- Species: G. alius

Binomial name
- Goniobranchus alius (Rudman, 1987)

Synonyms
- Chromodoris alius Rudman, 1987 (basionym)

= Goniobranchus alius =

Species of gastropod

Goniobranchus alius is a species of colourful sea slug, a dorid nudibranch, a marine gastropod mollusc in the family Chromodorididae.

== Distribution ==
This species is reported from Kenya to South Africa on the Western seaboard of the Indian Ocean and from Réunion and Sri Lanka. It is also reported from the Marshall Islands.
