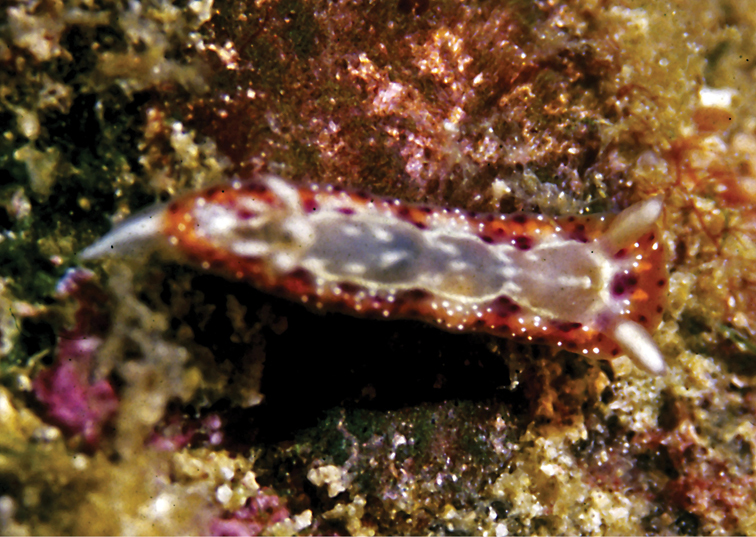

Scientific classification
- Kingdom: Animalia
- Phylum: Mollusca
- Class: Gastropoda
- Order: Nudibranchia
- Family: Chromodorididae
- Genus: Goniobranchus
- Species: G. decorus

Binomial name
- Goniobranchus decorus (Pease, 1860)

Synonyms
- Chromodoris decora (Pease, 1860); Chromodoris ndukuei Risbec, 1928; Doris decora Pease, 1860 (original combination); Glossodoris (Chromodoris) ndukuei (Risbec, 1928); Glossodoris decora (Pease, 1860); Glossodoris ndukuei (Risbec, 1928)

= Goniobranchus decorus =

Species of gastropod

Goniobranchus decorus is a species of sea slug, a dorid nudibranch, a marine gastropod mollusc in the family Chromodorididae.

== Taxonomic history ==
This species was known as Chromodoris decora for many years before it was transferred to the genus Goniobranchus on the basis of molecular (DNA) evidence in 2012.

== Distribution ==
This species was described from Hawaii. It has been confused with Goniobranchus setoensis and many records are therefore misidentifications. It occurs in the western Pacific Ocean from Hawaii to the Marshall Islands and New Caledonia. The two species are sympatric in the Marshall Islands.

== Description ==
The body of this chromodorid nudibranch is translucent white with opaque white lines, purple spots and a sub-surface margin of orange-red. There is usually a white line around the centre of the back which can extend into patches of white running towards the midline. The midline itself is usually marked with white patches or a broad white stripe with diffuse edges. Within the white are a few purple spots and these usually form a line down the centre of the back, always with a halo of white around them. The tips of the rhinophores and the outer part of the gills is white.

== Ecology ==
Goniobranchus decorus feeds on sponges of the family Aplysillidae including Chelonaplysilla violacea.
