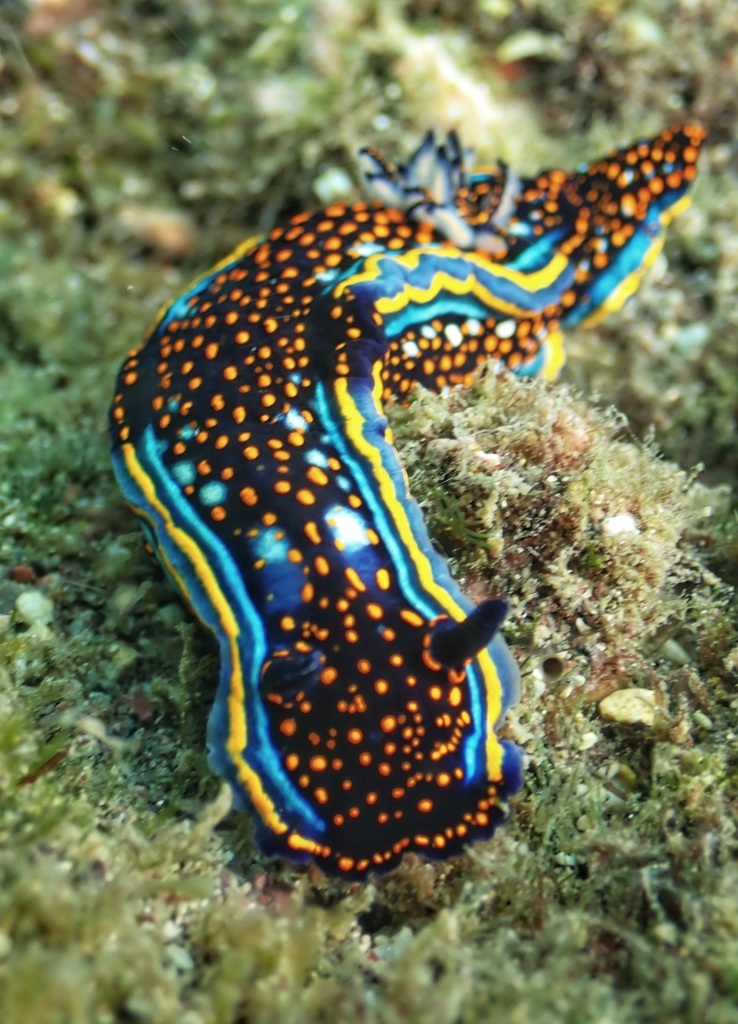

Scientific classification
- Kingdom: Animalia
- Phylum: Mollusca
- Class: Gastropoda
- Order: Nudibranchia
- Family: Chromodorididae
- Genus: Felimare
- Species: F. agassizii

Binomial name
- Felimare agassizii (Bergh, 1894)

Synonyms
- Chromodoris aegialia Bergh, 1904; Chromodoris agassizii Bergh, 1894 (basionym); Hypselodoris aegialia (Bergh, 1904); Hypselodoris agassizii (Bergh, 1894)

= Felimare agassizii =

Species of gastropod

Felimare agassizii is a species of sea slug or dorid nudibranch, a marine gastropod mollusk in the family Chromodorididae.

== Distribution ==
This nudibranch is known from the Eastern Pacific Ocean from the Galapagos Islands to Mexico.

== Description ==
Felimare agassizii has a black body flecked all over with yellow spots. The upper dorsum has a series of larger white spots running longitudinally. The mantle is edged with a green-yellow-green band, its gills are a translucent gold colour tipped with black and its rhinophores are black. This species can reach a total length of at least 100 mm.

== Ecology ==
The diet of Felimare agassizii was studied by Verdín Padilla et al. (2010) on the Pacific coast of Mexico. By examining the stomach content and feces, they found that this species feeds on demosponges and exhibits diet of nine species: Mycale psila, Mycale sp., Haliclona caerulea, Cliona californiana, Cliona papillae, Pione mazatlanensis, Tethya taboga, Geodia media and Dysidea uriae.
