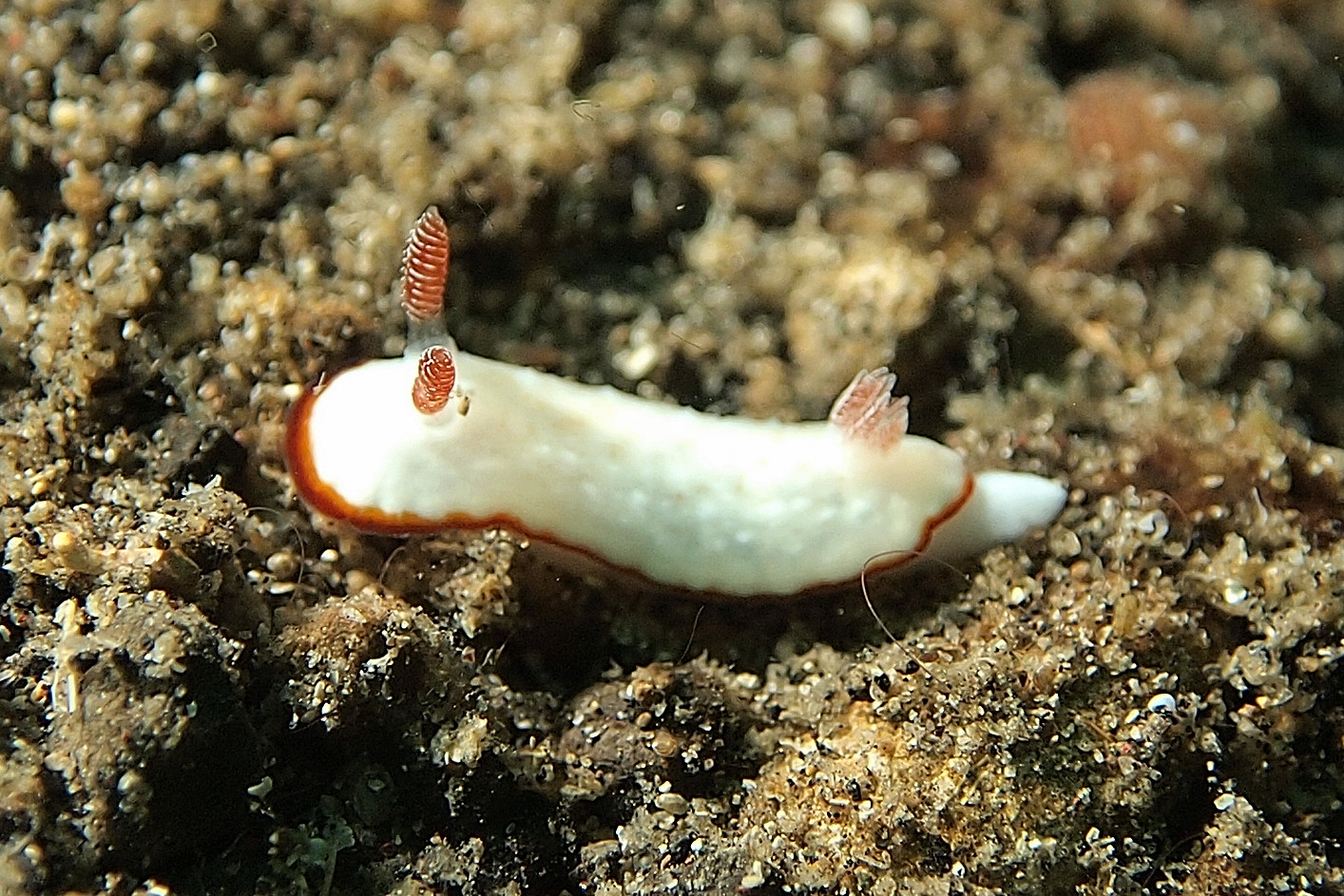
- Goniobranchus verrieri

Scientific classification
- Kingdom: Animalia
- Phylum: Mollusca
- Class: Gastropoda
- Order: Nudibranchia
- Family: Chromodorididae
- Genus: Goniobranchus
- Species: G. verrieri

Binomial name
- Goniobranchus verrieri (Crosse, 1875)

Synonyms
- Chromodoris marginata (Pease, 1860); Chromodoris verrieri (Crosse, 1875); Doris marginata Pease, 1860 (invalid: junior homonym of Doris marginata Montagu, 1803, and Doris marginata Quoy & Gaimard, 1832); Glossodoris verrieri (Crosse, 1875); Goniodoris verrieri Crosse, 1875 (basionym)

= Goniobranchus verrieri =

Species of gastropod

Goniobranchus verrieri is a species of colourful sea slug, a dorid nudibranch, a marine gastropod mollusk in the family Chromodorididae.

== Distribution ==
This marine species was described from New Caledonia. It is recorded from localities in the Indo-West Pacific.

== Description ==
Goniobranchus verrieri has a white mantle with a red margin and a yellow submarginal band. The gills and rhinophores are red with white edging. The length of the body varies between 18 mm and 30 mm.
