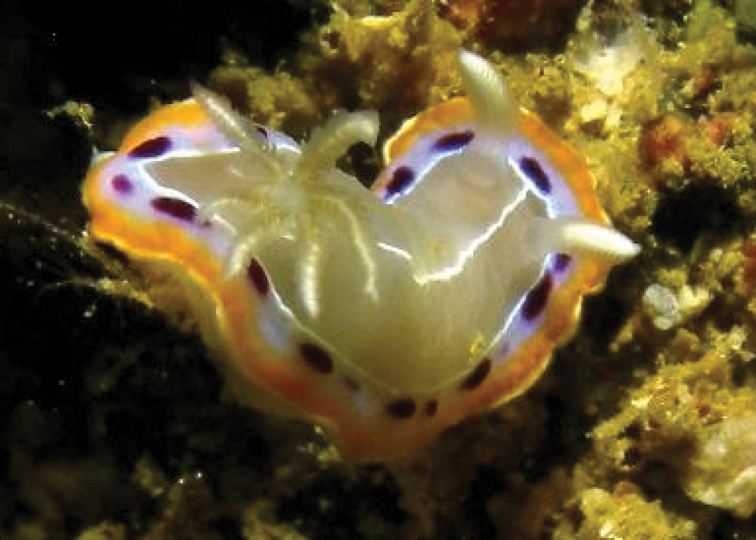
- The nudibranch Goniobranchus setoensis

Scientific classification
- Kingdom: Animalia
- Phylum: Mollusca
- Class: Gastropoda
- Order: Nudibranchia
- Family: Chromodorididae
- Genus: Goniobranchus
- Species: G. setoensis

Binomial name
- Goniobranchus setoensis (Baba, 1938)

Synonyms
- Glossodoris setoensis Baba, 1938 (original combination); Chromodoris setoensis (Baba, 1938)

= Goniobranchus setoensis =

Species of gastropod

Goniobranchus setoensis is a species of sea slug, a dorid nudibranch, a marine gastropod mollusc in the family Chromodorididae.

== Taxonomic history ==
This species was known as Chromodoris setoensis for many years before it was transferred to the genus Goniobranchus on the basis of molecular (DNA) evidence in 2012.

== Distribution ==
This species was described from Japan. It has been confused with Goniobranchus decorus and many records of G. decorus are in fact misidentifications. It occurs in the central Indo-Pacific region from Japan to Sri Lanka, and as far east as the Marshall Islands and Kiribati. The two species are sympatric in the Marshall Islands.

== Description ==
The body of this chromodorid nudibranch is translucent white with opaque white lines, purple spots and a sub-surface margin of orange-red. There is usually a white line around the centre of the back and a line running from between the rhinophores to the middle of the back where it divides to pass around the gills in a loop. Outside the outer white line is a row or double row of purple spots which never have a halo of white around them. There are small white spots along the mantle edge. The tips of the rhinophores and the outer part of the gills is white.

== Ecology ==
Goniobranchus setoensis feeds on sponges of the family Aplysillidae.
