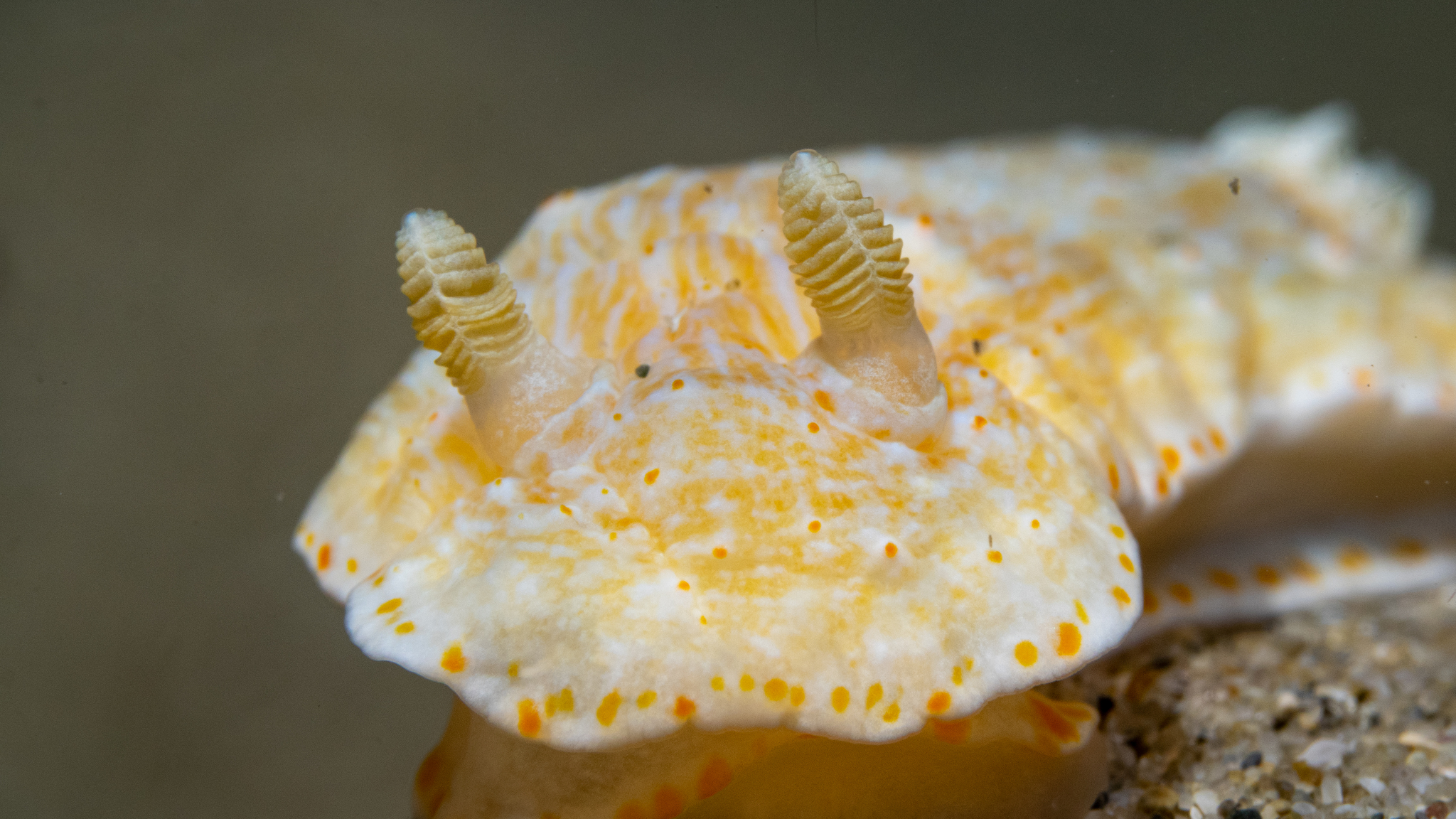

Scientific classification
- Kingdom: Animalia
- Phylum: Mollusca
- Class: Gastropoda
- Order: Nudibranchia
- Family: Chromodorididae
- Genus: Goniobranchus
- Species: G. epicurius

Binomial name
- Goniobranchus epicurius (Basedow & Hedley, 1905)

Synonyms
- Chromodoris epicuria (Basedow & Hedley, 1905); Chromodoris victoriae (Burn, 1957); Glossodoris victoriae Burn, 1957; Hypselodoris epicuria Basedow & Hedley, 1905 (basionym)

= Goniobranchus epicurius =

Species of gastropod

Goniobranchus epicurius is a species of colourful sea slug called a dorid nudibranch, a marine gastropod mollusc in the family Chromodorididae.

== Distribution ==
This species is known to range from South Australia to Victoria and Tasmania.

== Description ==
Goniobranchus epicurius is a chromodorid nudibranch with a translucent white mantle. The edge of the mantle is opaque white with orange spots. There are thin opaque white longitudinal lines and small orange spots on the mantle. The rhinophores and gills are translucent, edged with opaque white pigment. Specimens with a heavy dusting of red pigment and no white lines on the mantle match the original description.
