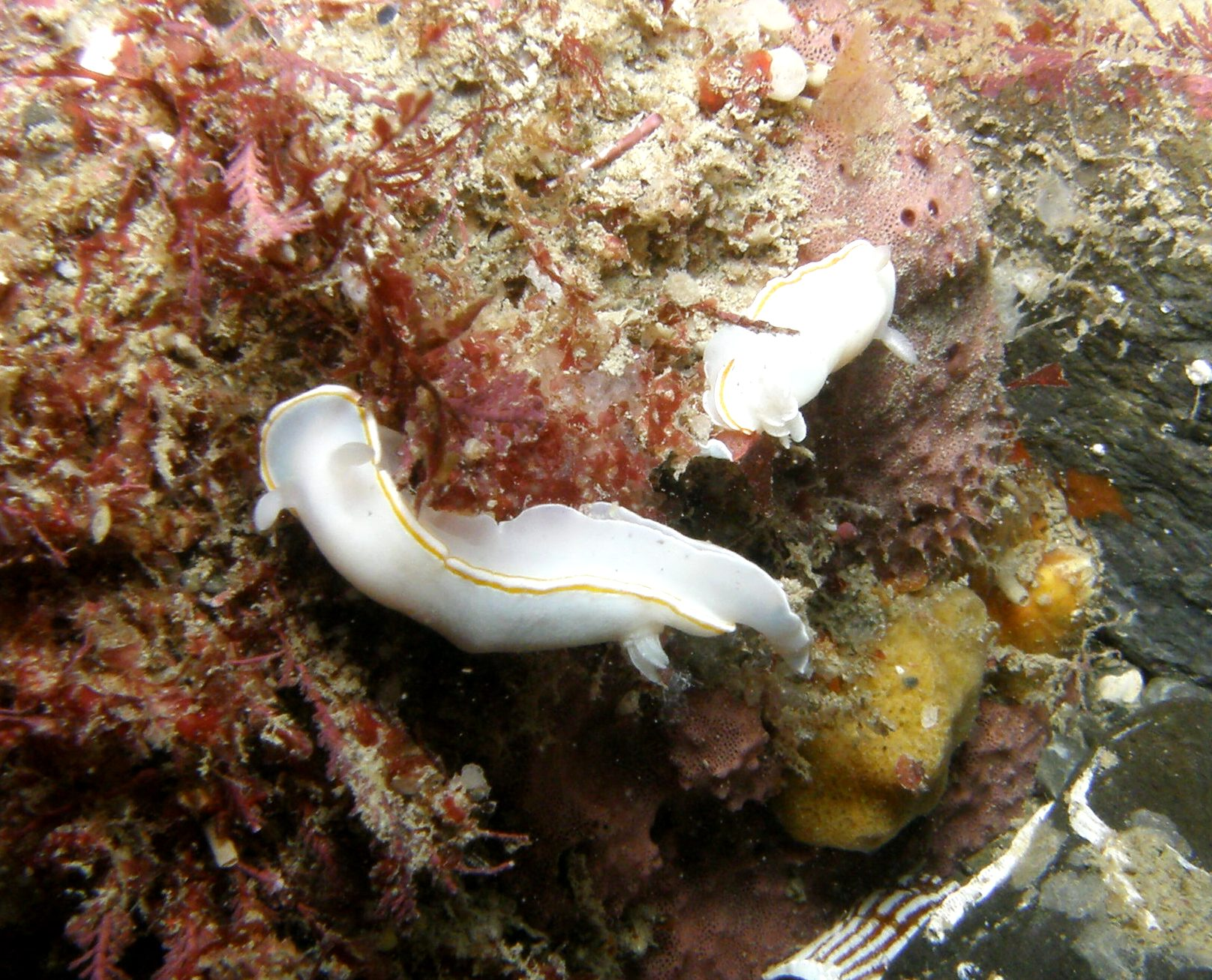

Scientific classification
- Kingdom: Animalia
- Phylum: Mollusca
- Class: Gastropoda
- Order: Nudibranchia
- Family: Chromodorididae
- Genus: Goniobranchus
- Species: G. aureomarginatus

Binomial name
- Goniobranchus aureomarginatus (Cheeseman, 1881)

Synonyms
- Chromodoris aureomarginata Cheeseman, 1881 (basionym); Glossodoris aureomarginata (Cheeseman, 1881); Lissodoris mollis Odhner, 1934 (Possible junior synonym of Chromodoris aureomarginata Cheeseman, 1881 (Rudman, 1984))

= Goniobranchus aureomarginatus =

Species of gastropod

Goniobranchus aureomarginatus is a species of colourful sea slug, a dorid nudibranch, a marine gastropod mollusc in the family Chromodorididae.

== Distribution ==
This species was described from Auckland harbour and Waiwera, New Zealand. It is apparently a New Zealand endemic.

== Description ==
This chromodorid nudibranch has a white mantle which is edged with yellow. The rhinophores and gills are translucent white with some opaque white pigment on the gill rachis and the rhinophore lamellae.
