= Chromodoris nona =

Scientific classification
- Kingdom: Animalia
- Phylum: Mollusca
- Class: Gastropoda
- Order: Nudibranchia
- Family: Chromodorididae
- Genus: Chromodoris
- Species: C. nona

Binomial name
- Chromodoris nona (Baba, 1953)

Synonyms
- Glossodoris nona Baba, 1953

Species of gastropod

Chromodoris nona is a species of colourful sea slug, a dorid nudibranch, a marine gastropod mollusc in the family Chromodorididae.

== Distribution ==
This marine species was described from a single specimen collected at 80 m (260 ft) depth at Amadaiba, Sagami Bay, Japan, 35.261°N 139.563°E. It has been reported from Hong Kong and locations in Japan including Osezaki.

== Description ==
Chromodoris nona is a translucent white chromodorid nudibranch with an opaque white edge to the mantle. There are conspicuous white glands embedded in the mantle margin. The rhinophores and the gills are yellow-orange in colour. The length of the body attains 25 mm (0.98 in).
