= Glossodoris moerchi =

Scientific classification
- Kingdom: Animalia
- Phylum: Mollusca
- Class: Gastropoda
- Order: Nudibranchia
- Family: Chromodorididae
- Genus: Glossodoris
- Species: G. moerchi

Binomial name
- Glossodoris moerchi (Bergh, 1879)

Synonyms
- Chromodoris mörchii Bergh, 1879; Goniodoris picturata Mörch, 1863

Species of gastropod

Glossodoris moerchi is a species of sea slug, a dorid nudibranch, a shell-less marine gastropod mollusk in the family Chromodorididae.

== Distribution ==
The type locality for this species is Saint Thomas, U.S. Virgin Islands, Caribbean Sea.

== Description ==
Glossodoris moerchi is most likely to be a species of Felimare as Mörch describes it as similar to Felimare villafranca but with a network of lines formed of rounded, triangular or hexagonal spots. The name Glossodoris moerchi was introduced by Bergh because Goniodoris picturata was preoccupied.
