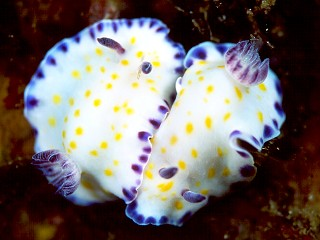
- Goniobranchus aureopurpureus mating

Scientific classification
- Kingdom: Animalia
- Phylum: Mollusca
- Class: Gastropoda
- Order: Nudibranchia
- Family: Chromodorididae
- Genus: Goniobranchus
- Species: G. aureopupurea

Binomial name
- Goniobranchus aureopupurea (Collingwood, 1881)

Synonyms
- Chromodoris aureopurpurea Collingwood, 1881 (basionym); Chromodoris variata Risbec, 1928; Glossodoris aureopurpurea (Collingwood, 1881); Glossodoris variata (Risbec, 1928)

= Goniobranchus aureopurpureus =

Species of gastropod

Goniobranchus aureopurpureus is a species of very colourful sea slug, a dorid nudibranch, a marine gastropod mollusk in the family Chromodorididae.

== Distribution ==
This species was described from the coast of China. It is reported from many localities in the central Indo-Pacific Ocean from the west coast of Australia to Japan and the Marshall Islands.
