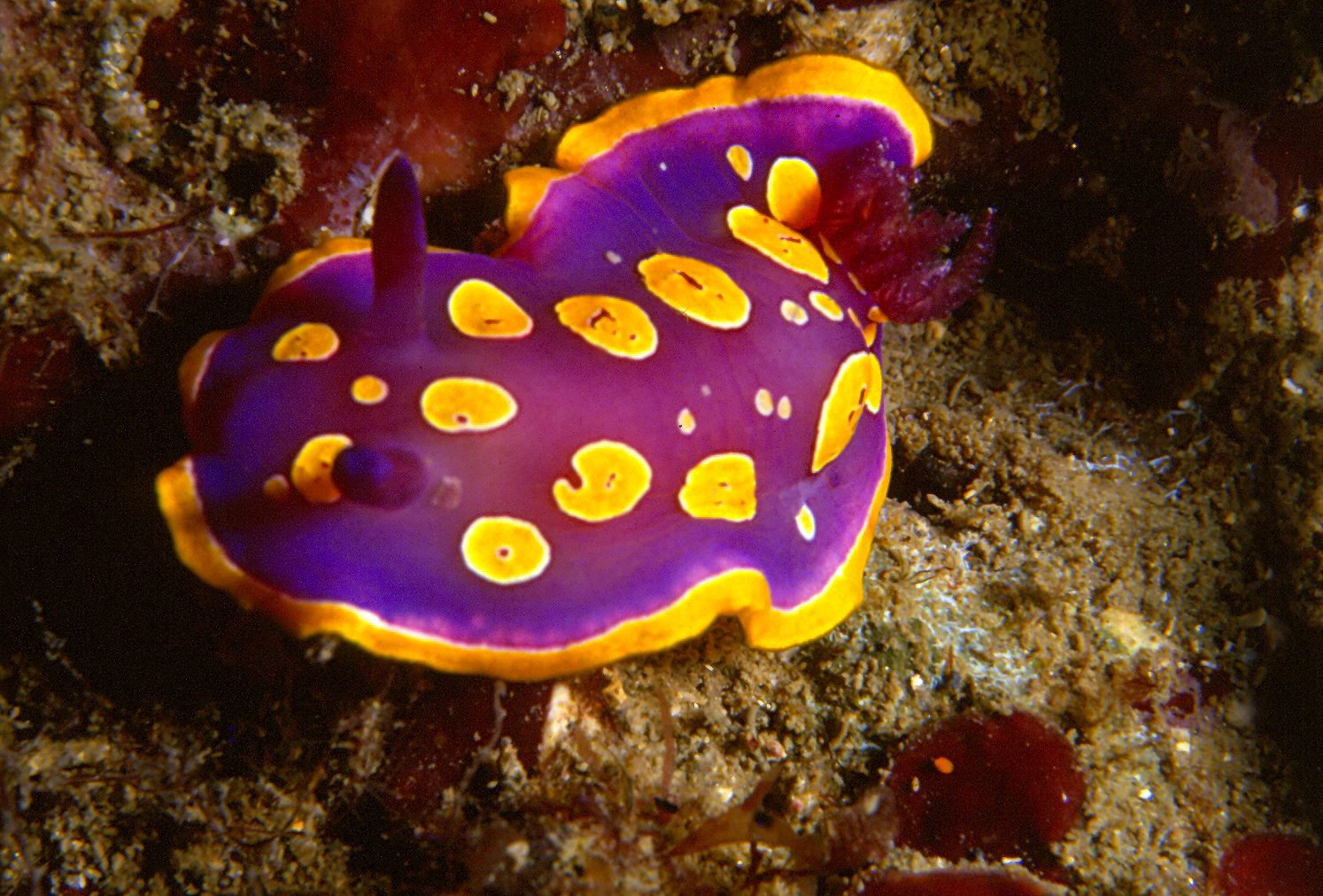
- Felimida luteorosea

Scientific classification
- Kingdom: Animalia
- Phylum: Mollusca
- Class: Gastropoda
- Order: Nudibranchia
- Family: Chromodorididae
- Genus: Felimida; Ev. Marcus, 1971

Type species
- Felimida sphoni Ev. Marcus, 1971

= Felimida =

Genus of gastropods

Felimida is a genus of sea slugs, dorid nudibranchs, shell-less marine gastropod mollusks in the family Chromodorididae.

== Taxonomic history ==
Many of the species currently included in the genus Felimida were previously contained in the large genus Chromodoris until a revision of the family Chromodorididae demonstrated that the name Chromodoris should be used for a smaller group of species.

When Eveline Du Bois-Reymond Marcus introduced the genus in 1971, her rationale was: "As it is desirable to subdivide the numerous species of the genus Chromodoris, I allot the present material to the new genus Felimida, based upon the denticulation of the radular teeth. There are no species of Chromodoris known to have denticles on the inner side of the lateral teeth 2-4."

Felimida is a polyphyletic genus. In 2025, a clade was identified within Felimida through molecular and morphological analysis, and subsequently several species were transferred to their own genus, Rudmania.

== Etymology ==
Felimida was first described by Marcus, when she proposed F. sphoni as the genus' type species as well as introduced the similar species Doris tanya. F. sphoni is named for malacologist Gale Sphon, who sent Marcus specimens of the species while working for the Los Angeles County Museum. D. tanya is named after Tanya, Sphon's cat, and the genus name Felimida allegedly refers to the Latin word for cat.

== Description ==
Marcus characterized Felimida as "Chromodoridids with unicuspidate lateral teeth, with many denticles on the outer side, and with denticles on the inner side of laterals 1-4."

== Species ==
- Felimida baumanni Bertsch, 1970
- Felimida binza Ev. Marcus & Er. Marcus, 1963 - harlequin sea goddess
- Felimida clenchi Russell, 1935 - harlequin blue doris
- Felimida corimbae Ortea, Gofas & Valdés, 1997
- Felimida elegantula Philippi, 1844
- Felimida galexorum Bertsch, 1978
- Felimida ghanensis Edmunds, 1968
- Felimida goslineri Ortea & Valdés, 1996
- Felimida luteopunctata Gantès, 1962
- Felimida luteorosea Rapp, 1827
- Felimida macfarlandi Cockerell, 1901 - Macfarland's nudibranch
- Felimida marislae Bertsch, 1973
- Felimida norrisi Farmer, 1963
- Felimida ocellata Ortea, Gofas & Valdés, 1997
- Felimida ponga Er. Marcus & Ev. Marcus, 1970
- Felimida punctilucens Bergh, 1890
- Felimida regalis Ortea, Caballer & Moro, 2001
- Felimida rolani Ortea, 1988
- Felimida ruzafai Ortea, Bacallado & Valdés, 1992
- Felimida socorroensis Behrens, Gosliner & Hermosillo, 2009
- Felimida sphoni Ev. Marcus, 1971
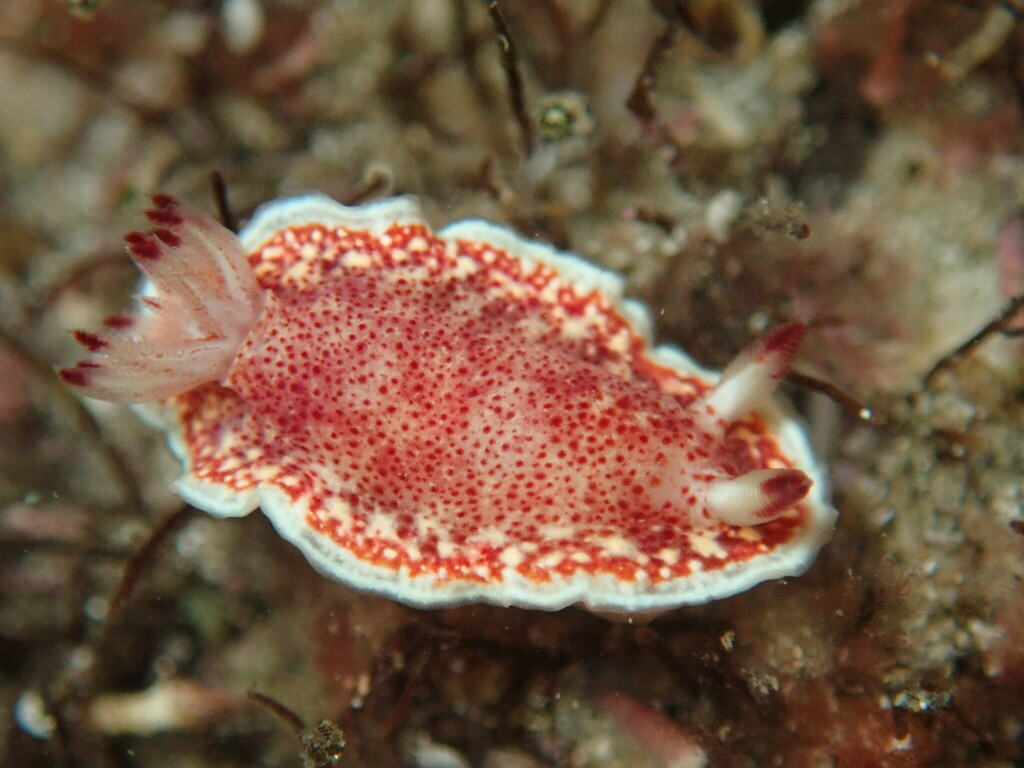
Felimida baumanni

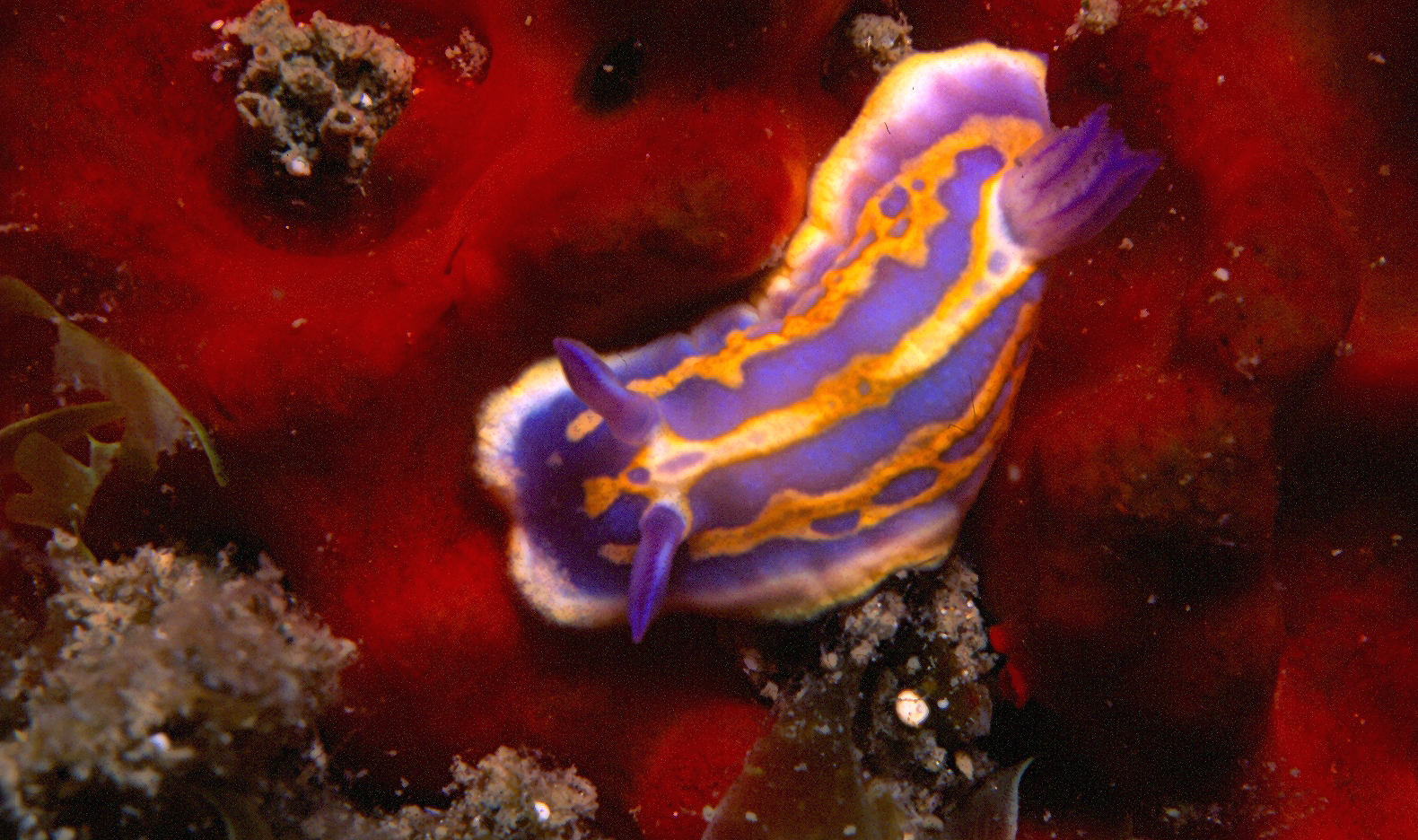
Felimida binza

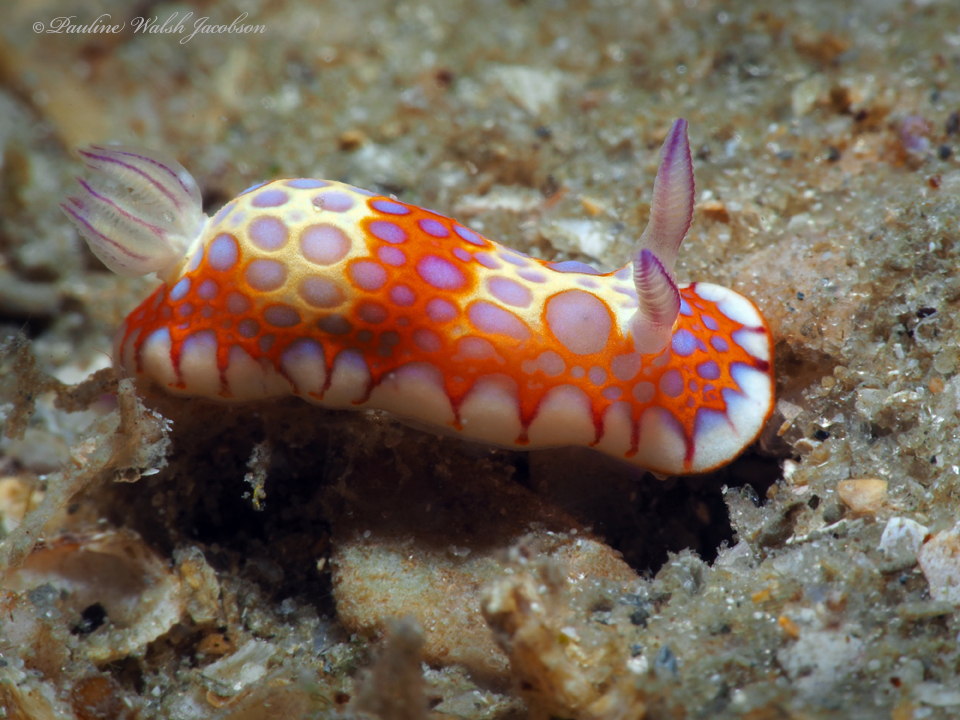
Felimida binza

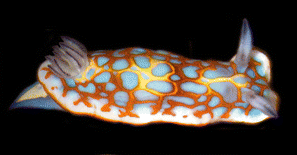
Felimida clenchi

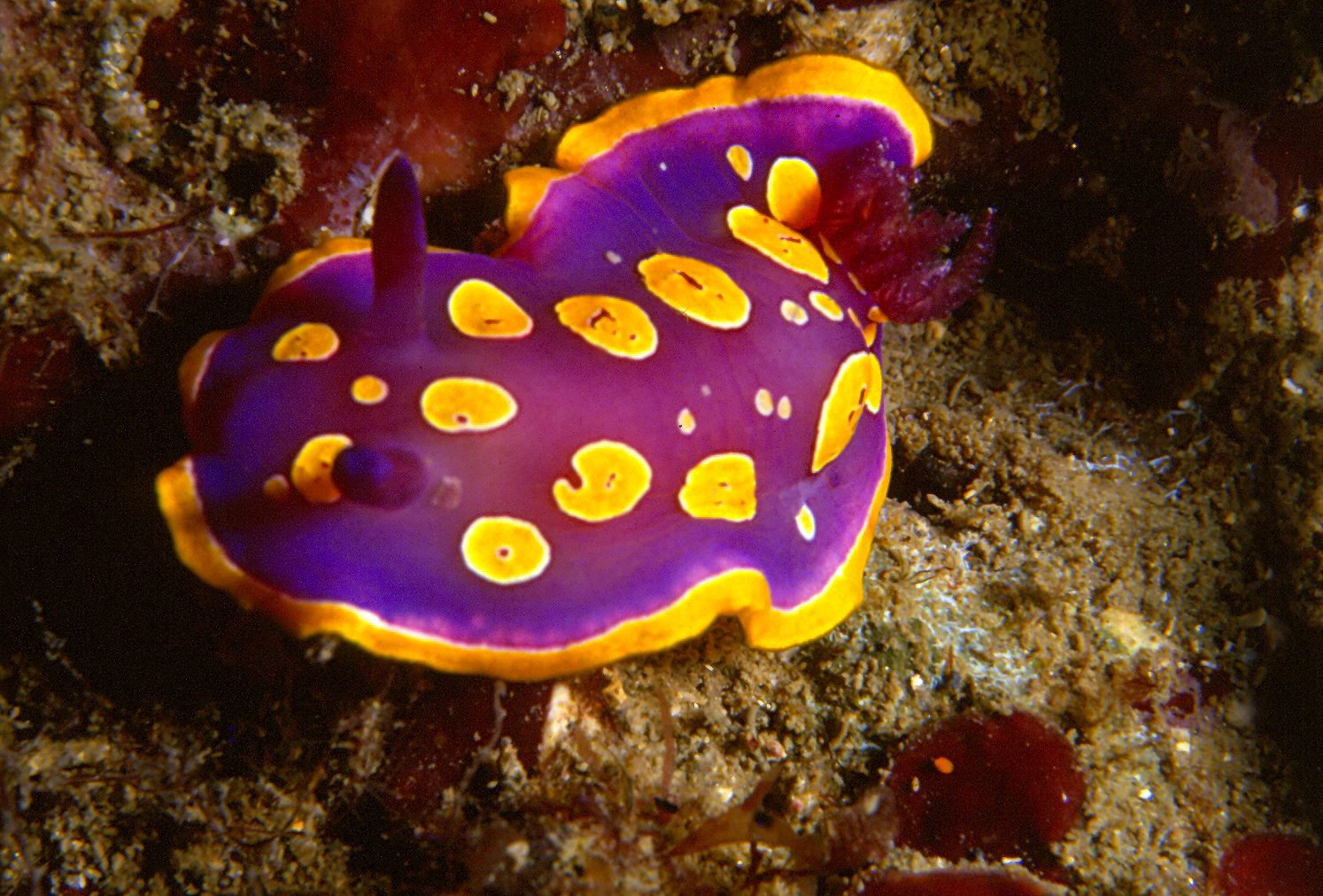
Felimida luteorosea

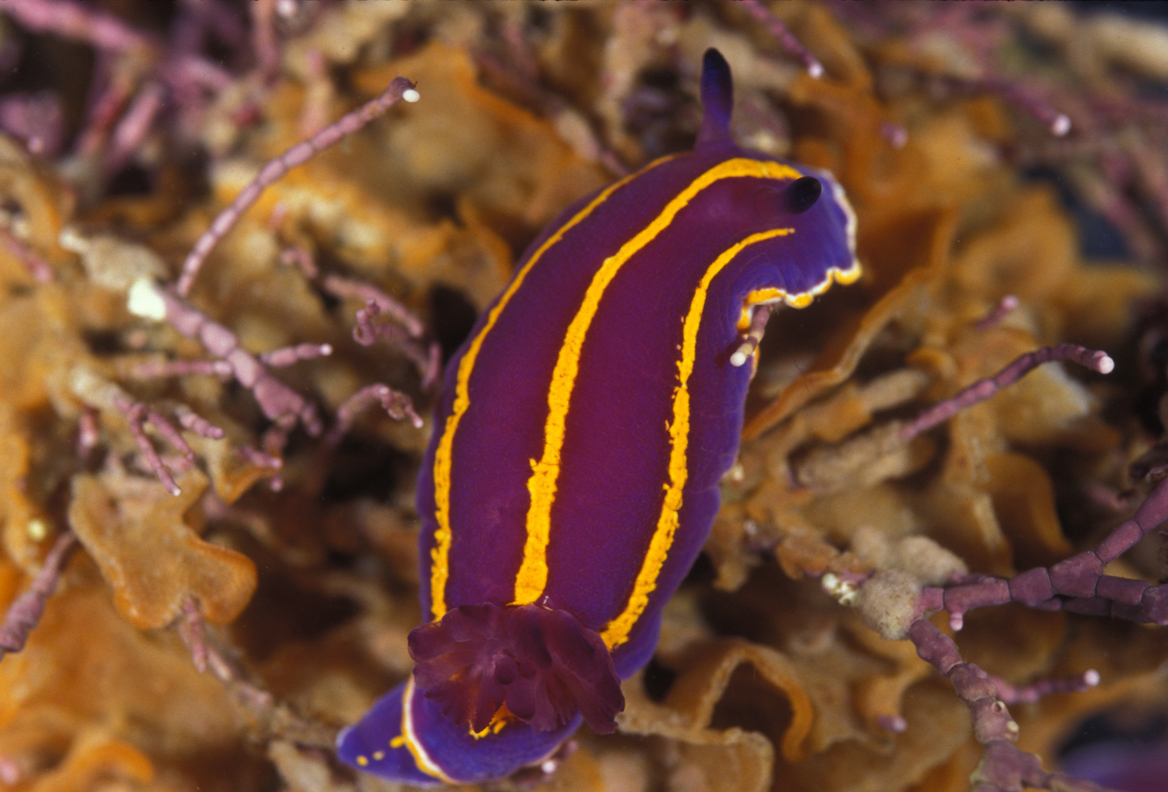
Felimida macfarlandi

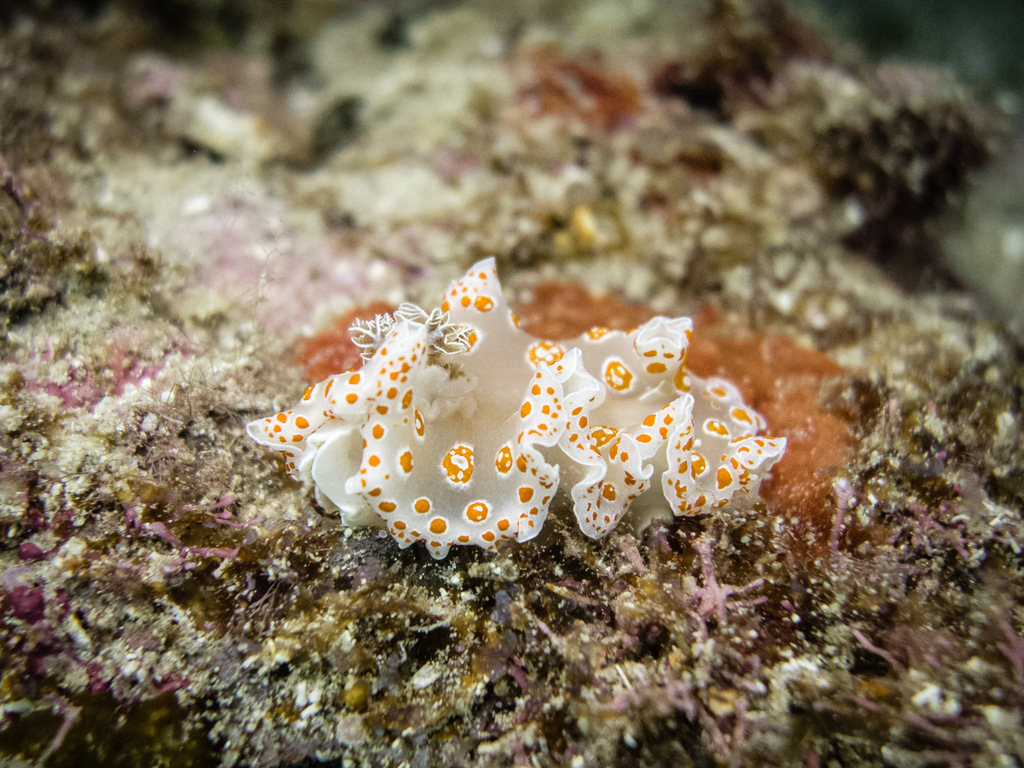
Felimida marislae

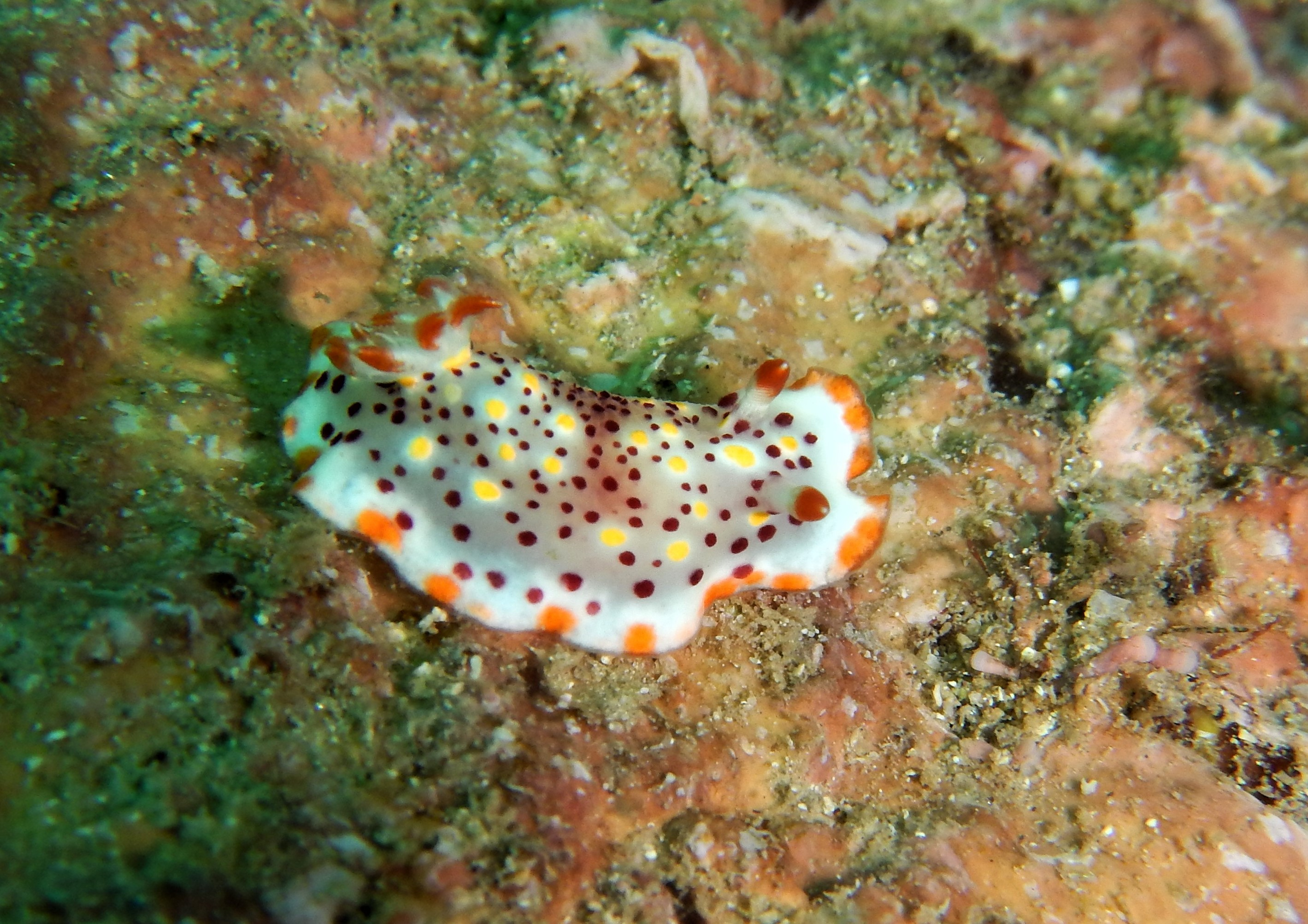
Felimida norrisi

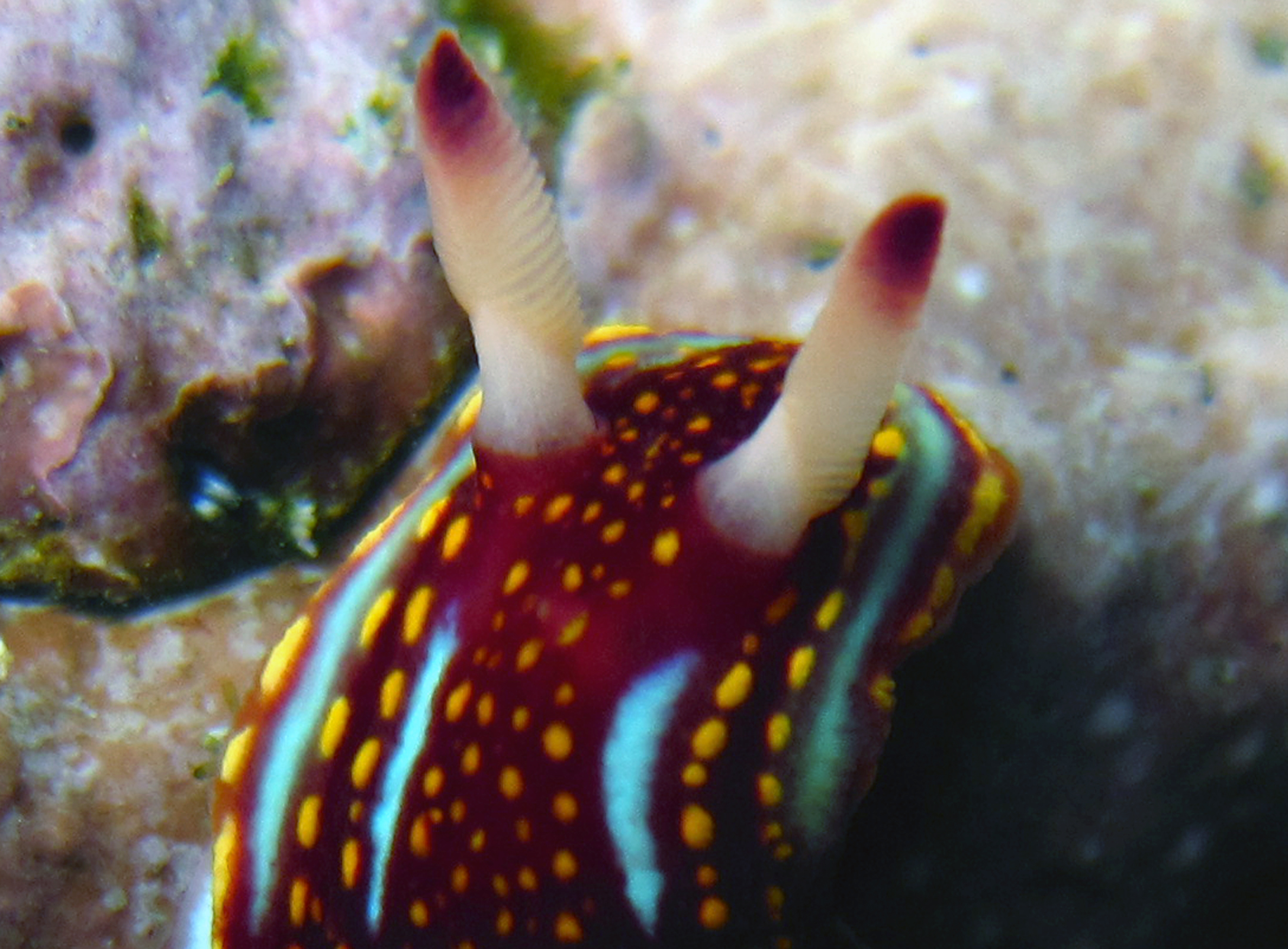
Felimida sphoni

Species currently brought into synonymy:

- Felimida atlantica Padula, Wirtz & Schrödl, 2017: synonym of Rudmania atlantica
- Felimida britoi Ortea & J. M. Pérez, 1983: synonym of Felimida binza Ev. Marcus & Er. Marcus, 1963
- Felimida dalli Bergh, 1879: synonym of Chromolaichma dalli
- Felimida edmundsi Cervera, Garcia-Gomez & Ortea, 1989: synonym of Chromolaichma edmundsi
- Felimida fentoni Valdés, Gatdula, Sheridan & Herrera, 2011: synonym of Rudmania fentoni
- Felimida grahami T. E. Thompson, 1980: synonym of Rudmania grahami
- Felimida kpone Edmunds, 1981: synonym of Rudmania kpone
- Felimida krohni Vérany, 1846: synonym of Rudmania krohni
- Felimida neona Er. Marcus, 1955: synonym of Felimida clenchi Russell, 1935
- Felimida paulomarcioi Domínguez, García & Troncoso, 2006): synonym of Rudmania grahami T. E. Thompson, 1980
- Felimida purpurea Risso in Guérin, 1831: synonym of Rudmania purpurea
- Felimida rodomaculata Ortea & Valdés, 1992: synonym of Felimida luteopunctata Gantès, 1962
