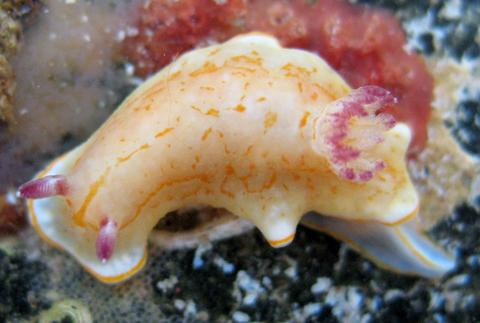

Scientific classification
- Kingdom: Animalia
- Phylum: Mollusca
- Class: Gastropoda
- Order: Nudibranchia
- Family: Chromodorididae
- Genus: Rudmania
- Species: R. grahami

Binomial name
- Rudmania grahami (Thompson, 1980)

Synonyms
- Chromodoris grahami T. E. Thompson, 1980; Chromodoris paulomarcioi M. Domínguez, F. J. García & Troncoso, 2006; Felimida grahami T. E. Thompson, 1980; Felimida paulomarcioi M. Domínguez, F. J. García & Troncoso, 2006

= Rudmania grahami =

Species of gastropod

Rudmania grahami is a species of colourful sea slug, a dorid nudibranch, a marine gastropod mollusc in the family Chromodorididae.

== Taxonomic history ==
This species should be transferred to Felimida according to Johnson & Gosliner (2012).

‘Felimida’ Marcus, 1971 [86].

Type species: Felimida sphoni Marcus, 1971 [86] (by monotypy) This name will be used for all eastern Pacific and Atlantic species of Chromodoris and Glossodoris (except Glossodoris sedna). These species form a polytomy including Glossodoris baumanni and three clades of Atlantic and Eastern Pacific chromodorids. Chromodoris clenchi, C. norrisi and C. sphoni (pp = 1.00) Glossodoris dalli and G. edmundsi (pp = 1.00) Chromodoris krohni, C. luteorosea and C. purpurea (pp = 0.78)

These exclusively eastern Pacific and Atlantic clades do not form a monophyletic group, but we will provisionally name all of these species ‘Felimida’. This is the most conservative choice, the choice that requires the fewest name changes and is the least disruptive pending further information and broader taxon sampling.

Over a decade later, a study re-evaluated the genus Felimida through molecular phylogeny and morphological analysis. While it was known that Felimida is polyphyletic, molecular analysis conducted in De Oliveira et al. (2025) lead to the discovery of a clade within Felimida that necessitated its own genus, established therein Rudmania (J. P. G. Oliveira, Henryco, Ardila, Schrödl & Padula, 2025). Felimida grahami and Felimida paulomarcioi were determined to be the same species, and united as Rudmania grahami. Other species moved from Felimida to Rudmania include Rudmania atlantica, Rudmania fentoni, Rudmania krohni, Rudmania kpone, and Rudmania purpurea.

== Distribution ==
This species was described from Jamaica. It has been reported from Colombia.

== Description ==
The maximum recorded length is 20 mm.

== Habitat ==
Minimum recorded depth is 1 m. Maximum recorded depth is 5 m.
