= Chromodoridinae =

- Chromodoris magnifica, the type species of Chromodoridinae

Scientific classification
- Kingdom: Animalia
- Phylum: Mollusca
- Class: Gastropoda
- Order: Nudibranchia
- Family: Chromodorididae
- Subfamily: Chromodoridinae; Bergh, 1891

Type genus
- Chromodoris Alder & Hancock, 1855

Genera
- See text

Synonyms
- Doriprismaticinae H. Adams & A. Adams, 1858; Glossodorididae O'Donoghue, 1924; Lissodoridinae Odhner, 1958; Thorunninae Odhner, 1926

Subfamily of gastropods

Chromodoridinae is a taxonomic subfamily of marine gastropod mollusks within the family Chromodorididae.

== Taxonomic History ==
Chromodoridinae was originally described by Rudolph Bergh in 1891, despite his usage of the suffix -idae that traditionally denotes familial status.

In Bouchet & Rocroi 2005 and Bouchet et al., 2017 it was recorded as the official subfamily in use in favor of other nomen oblitum.

== Description ==
The original 1891 text describes Chromodoridinids as having elongated, soft bodies with mantle margins especially broad at the anterior and posterior. The notums are generally smooth, and oral tentacles smalls and conical. Colouration is bright, "often magnificient", and often striped or spotted.

All chromodoridinids eat sponges.

== Genera ==
Genera currently within the subfamily Chromodoridinae include:

- Ardeadoris Rudman, 1984
- Berlanguella Ortea, Bacallado & Á. Valdés, 1992
- Chromodoris Alder & Hancock, 1855
- Chromolaichma Bertsch, 1977
- Diversidoris Rudman, 1987
- Doriprismatica A. d'Orbigny, 1839
- Felimida Ev. Marcus, 1971
- Glossodoris Ehrenberg, 1831
- Goniobranchus Pease, 1866
- Neptunazurea Ribeiro, García-Méndez, Valdés, Schrödl & Padula, 2025
- Rudmania J. P. G. Oliveira, Henryco, Ardila, Schrödl & Padula, 2025
- Tyrinna Bergh, 1898
- Verconia Pruvot-Fol, 1931

Genera currently in synonymy include:

- Actinodoris Ehrenberg: synonym of Chromodoris Alder & Hancock, 1855
- Casella H. Adams & A. Adams, 1854: synonym of Glossodoris Ehrenberg, 1831
- Crepidodoris Pagenstecher, 1877: synonym of Doriprismatica A. d'Orbigny, 1839
- Lissodoris Odhner, 1934: synonym of Goniobranchus Pease, 1866
- Noumea Risbec, 1928: synonym of Verconia Pruvot-Fol, 1931
- Rosodoris Pruvot-Fol, 1954: synonym of Glossodoris Ehrenberg, 1831
Ardeadoris tomsmithi

Chromodoris annae

Chromolaichma hemera

Diversidoris crocea

Doriprismatica atromarginata

Felimida sphoni mating

Glossodoris bonwanga

Goniobranchus gleniei

Neptunazurea kempfi exhibiting "trailing" behaviour

Rudmania krohni

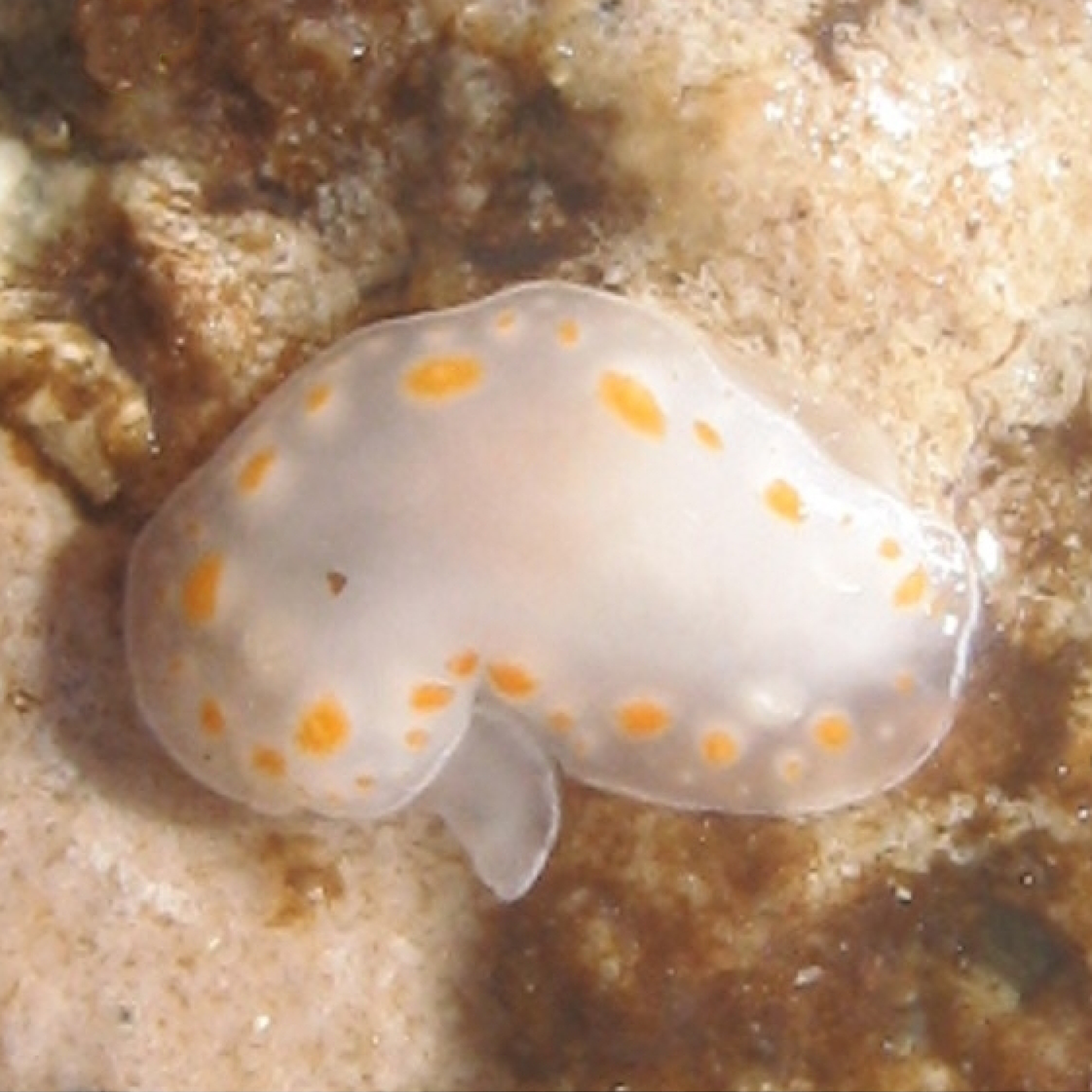
Tyrinna delicata
