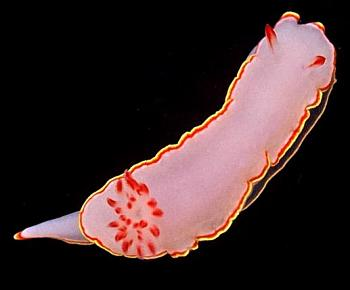
- Chromolaichma sedna

Conservation status
- Secure (NatureServe)

Scientific classification
- Kingdom: Animalia
- Phylum: Mollusca
- Class: Gastropoda
- Order: Nudibranchia
- Family: Chromodorididae
- Subfamily: Chromodoridinae
- Genus: Chromolaichma
- Species: C. sedna

Binomial name
- Chromolaichma sedna (Ev. Marcus & Er. Marcus, 1967)

Synonyms
- Casella sedna Ev. Marcus & Er. Marcus, 1967 (basionym); Chromodoris fayae Lance, 1968; Chromodoris sedna (Ev. Marcus & Er. Marcus, 1967); Dorisprismatica sedna (Ev.Marcus & Er. Marcus, 1967); Glossodoris sedna (Ev. Marcus & Er. Marcus, 1967)

= Chromolaichma sedna =

Species of gastropod

Chromolaichma sedna is a species of colorful sea slug, a dorid nudibranch, a marine gastropod mollusk in the family Chromodorididae.

== Taxonomy ==
This species was previously placed in the genus Glossodoris Ehrenberg, 1831, but it was transferred to genus Doriprismatica by Johnson & Gosliner in 2012 on the basis of molecular results.

== Distribution ==
Originally described from the Eastern Pacific, records from the Caribbean are considered the result of a recent introduction, presumably human-introduced. The indigenous distribution of Doriprismatica sedna includes Eastern Pacific: from the Gulf of California to the Galapagos Islands and non-indigenous in the Western Atlantic: Florida, Belize, Bahamas and Panama.

== Description ==
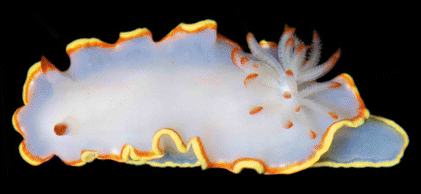
Chromolaichma sedna

The body is oval and the mantle margin is ruffled. The foot and mantle of this seaslug have three different colours at the border: white, red and yellow on the outer border. Background colour is white with two coloured bands (inner red and outer yellow) bordering the foot and mantle. Upper half of the rhinophoral clubs and tips of the branchial leaves of the gill are red. It is up to 65 mm long.

== Habitat ==
This species was found on mangrove roots covered with sponges in Panama. The minimum recorded depth for this species is 1 m; maximum recorded depth is 29 m.

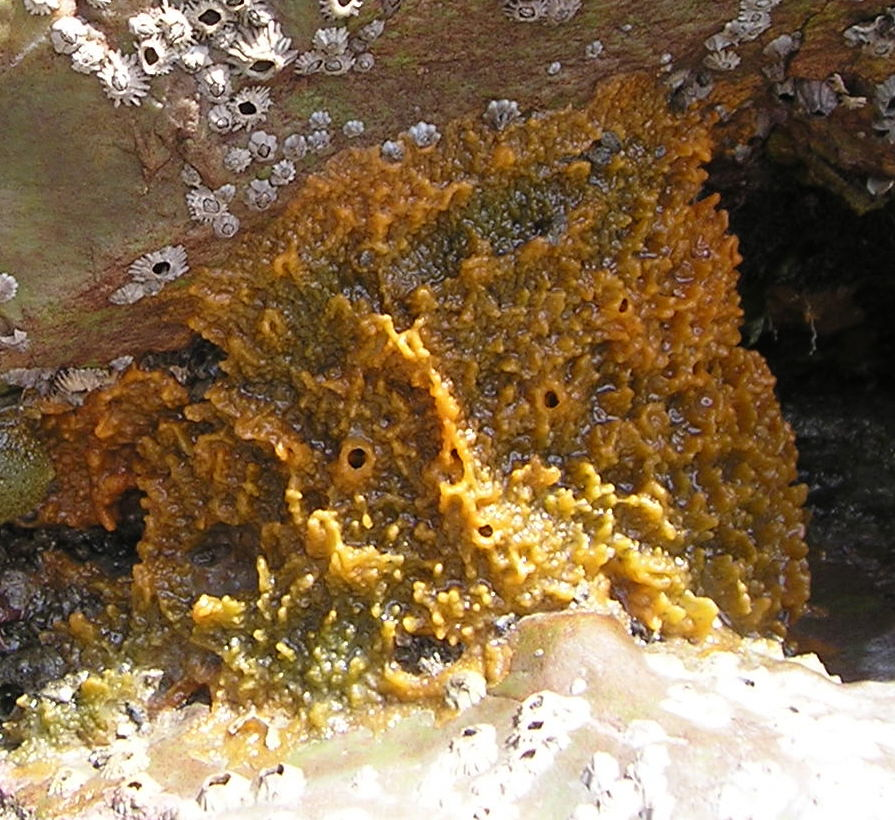
Prey of Chromolaichma sedna include demosponge Myxilla incrustans.

The diet of Doriprismatica sedna was studied by Verdín Padilla et al. (2010) on the Pacific coast of Mexico. By examining the stomach content and feces, they found that this species feeds exclusively on spiculated demosponges and exhibits a variable diet, which includes 17 different species: Mycale psila, Microciona sp., Myxilla incrustans, Lissodendoryx isodictialis, Haliclona caerulea, Haliclona turquoisia, Callyspongia californica, Cliona californiana, Cliona amplicavata, Cliona flavifodina, Cliona papillae, Pione mazatlanensis, Pione carpenteri, Tethya taboga, Aaptos niger, Geodia media and Dysidea uriae.
