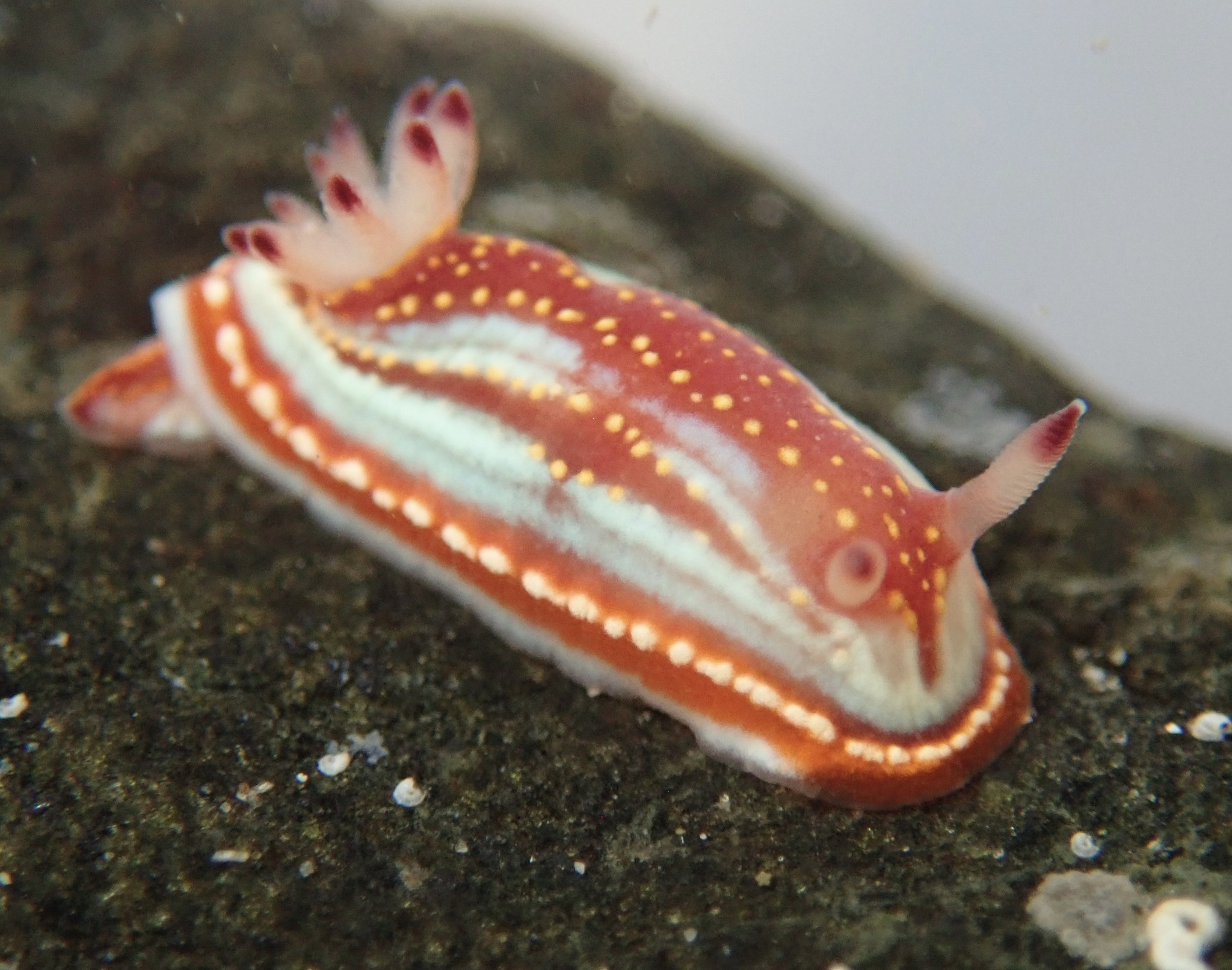

Scientific classification
- Kingdom: Animalia
- Phylum: Mollusca
- Class: Gastropoda
- Order: Nudibranchia
- Family: Chromodorididae
- Genus: Felimida
- Species: F. sphoni

Binomial name
- Felimida sphoni Ev. Marcus, 1971

Synonyms
- Chromodoris sphoni (Ev. Marcus, 1971)

= Felimida sphoni =

Species of gastropod

Felimida sphoni is a species of colorful sea slug and a marine gastropod mollusk in the family Chromodorididae. It was first described by Eveline Du Bois-Reymond Marcus in 1971, when she introduced it as a type species for her proposal of the genus Felimida.

== Description ==
F. sphoni has a red or dark purple body with orange spots, as well as four regions — two at the front of the body and two at the back — that are an off-white or light green color. In some specimens, the dark-colored body lightens to white, retaining the orange spots and stripes. Its rhinophores and gills are white with purple tips. The body reaches a length of about 35 to 40 mm.

== Distribution ==
This species occurs in the Pacific Ocean off the Galapagos Islands and in the Gulf of California, Western Mexico, as well as off the western coasts of Costa Rica, Panama, and Ecuador.

== Etymology ==
The name sphoni refers to the malacologist Gale Sphon (1934-1995) who collected the mollusk off the coast of Mexico while working for the Los Angeles County Museum. Sphon sent five specimens to São Paulo, where Eveline Du Bois-Reymond Marcus described and named the species in 1971. In the same paper, Marcus described Doris tanya, a similar species that she named after Sphon's cat, Tanya.

Other species named after Sphon include Neotiara sphoni, Olivella sphoni, and Felimida galexorum, the latter being a portmanteau of Sphon and underwater photographer Alex Kerstitch's names, both frequent collaborators of Marcus.
