= Felimida rolani =

Scientific classification
- Kingdom: Animalia
- Phylum: Mollusca
- Class: Gastropoda
- Order: Nudibranchia
- Family: Chromodorididae
- Genus: Felimida
- Species: F. rolani

Binomial name
- Felimida rolani (Er. Marcus & Ev. Marcus, 1970)

Synonyms
- Chromodoris rolani Ortea, 1988 (basionym)

Species of gastropod

Felimida rolani is a species of colourful sea slug, a dorid nudibranch, a marine gastropod mollusk in the family Chromodorididae.

== Distribution ==
This species occurs in the Atlantic Ocean off Cape Verde.
