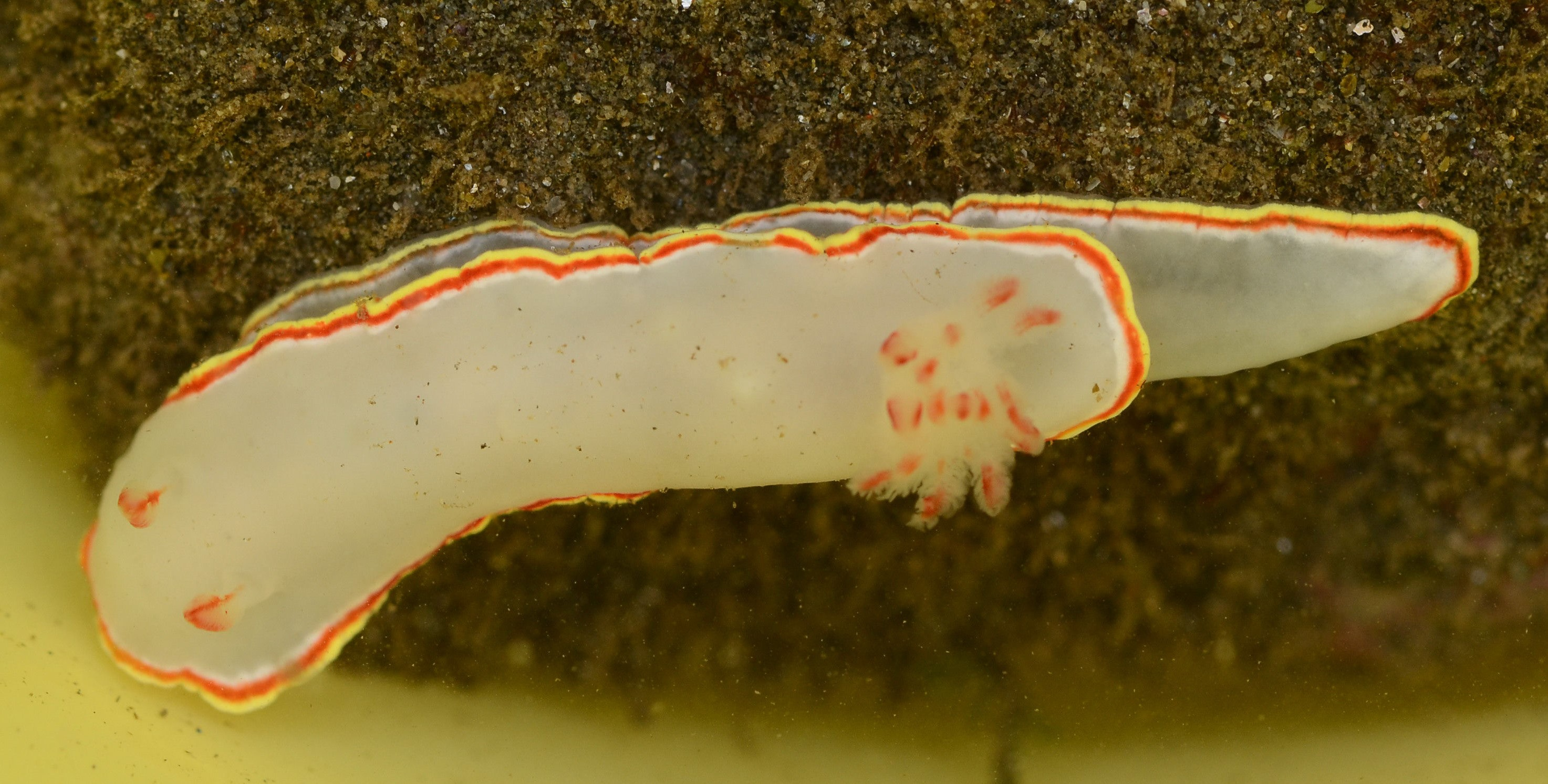
- Chromolaichma sedna

Scientific classification
- Kingdom: Animalia
- Phylum: Mollusca
- Class: Gastropoda
- Order: Nudibranchia
- Family: Chromodorididae
- Subfamily: Chromodoridinae
- Genus: Chromolaichma; Bertsch, 1977

Type species
- Chromolaichma sedna Bertsch, 1977

= Chromolaichma =

Genus of gastropods

Chromolaichma is a genus of sea slugs, specifically dorid nudibranchs, shell-less marine gastropod mollusks in the family Chromodorididae.

== Species ==
This genus includes the following species:

- Chromolaichma dalli Rudman, 1990
- Chromolaichma edmundsi Rudman, 1985
- Chromolaichma hemera Layton & N. G. Wilson, 2024
- Chromolaichma sedna Ev. Marcus & Er. Marcus, 1967

Synonyms

- Chromolaichma punctilucens (Bergh, 1890): synonym of Felimida punctilucens
- Chromolaichma youngbleuthi (Kay & D. K. Young, 1969): synonym of Glossodoris rufomarginata (Bergh, 1890)
