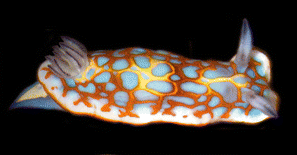
- Oblique right side view of Felimida cf. clenchi from Panama.

Scientific classification
- Domain: Eukaryota
- Kingdom: Animalia
- Phylum: Mollusca
- Class: Gastropoda
- Order: Nudibranchia
- Family: Chromodorididae
- Genus: Felimida
- Species: F. clenchi

Binomial name
- Felimida clenchi (Russell, 1935)

Synonyms
- Glossodoris clenchi Russell, 1935; Chromodoris clenchi (Russell, 1935); Glossodoris neona Er. Marcus, 1955; Chromodoris neona (Er. Marcus, 1955); Felimida neona (Er. Marcus, 1955)

= Felimida clenchi =

Species of gastropod

Felimida clenchi, common name the Harlequin blue doris, is a species of colorful sea slug, a dorid nudibranch, a marine gastropod mollusk in the family Chromodorididae.

== Taxonomy ==
This species was originally a member of the genus Chromodoris Alder & Hancock, 1855. It was recently transferred to Felimida in 2012. This species is part of a complex that comprises Felimida binza (Ev. Marcus & Er. Marcus, 1963). These species share a similar reticular pattern of yellow and red pigment and morphology.

Felimida neona was described under the name Glossodoris neona by Ernst Marcus in Brazil in 1955. It was also known as the "Neon Sea Goddess". It was distinguished by the presence of white rhinophores and blue-tipped brachial leaves. Felimida neona was synonymized with Felimida clenchi by Padula et al. in 2016. They also changed color pattern for identification of Felimida clenchi and Felimida binza.

== Distribution ==
This species occurs in the Gulf of Mexico, the Caribbean Sea and the Lesser Antilles. Distribution of Felimida clenchi includes Florida, Costa Rica, Panama, Colombia, Venezuela, Bermuda, Cayman Islands, Jamaica, Curaçao, St. Lucia, St. Vincent and the Grenadines (according to Goodheart et al. 2016). This distribution data needs to be checked again in consideration of the new color-pattern versus DNA concept of the species complex, as laid out by Padula et al. (2016).

== Description ==
The body is oval. Dorsum is smooth. Background color is pale blue with a dense pattern of red covering the dorsum, but leaving small circular uncovered areas. The red becomes yellow near the rhinophores and gill. Mantle margin is with a submarginal white band edged with a red line. Rhinophores and gill are white with purple rachises. The maximum recorded length is 30 mm.

== Habitat ==
The minimum recorded depth for this species is 0 m; the maximum recorded depth is 30 m. This nudibranch species was found under rocks or on sponges in Panama.
