= Njurja netsica =

Scientific classification
- Kingdom: Animalia
- Phylum: Mollusca
- Class: Gastropoda
- Order: Nudibranchia
- Suborder: Aeolidacea
- Family: Trinchesiidae
- Genus: Njurja
- Species: N. netsica

Binomial name
- Njurja netsica (Er. Marcus & Ev. Marcus, 1960)

Synonyms
- Cuthona netsica Er. Marcus & Ev. Marcus, 1960

Species of gastropod

Njurja netsica is a species of sea slug, an aeolid nudibranch, a marine gastropod mollusc in the family Trinchesiidae.

== Distribution ==
This species originates from the Kaafu Atoll region of the Maldives.
