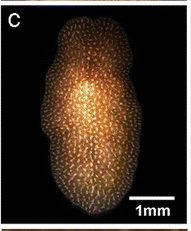

Scientific classification
- Kingdom: Animalia
- Phylum: Platyhelminthes
- Order: Polycladida
- Suborder: Cotylea
- Family: Prosthiostomidae
- Genus: Amakusaplana
- Species: A. acroporae

Binomial name
- Amakusaplana acroporae Rawlinson, Gillis, Billings & Borneman, 2011

= Amakusaplana acroporae =

Species of flatworm

Amakusaplana acroporae, the Acropora-eating flatworm or AEFW, is a species of free-living marine polyclad flatworms in the genus Amakusaplana.

This species preys on the genus Acropora in reef aquariums. These flatworms can grow up to 6 mm and the number of eyes they have increases with body length. They also possess excellent camouflage, hiding on the underside of Acropora coral branches and mimicking the host's color and pigment distribution by extracting fluorescent pigments from the host.
