= Amakusaplana =

Scientific classification
- Domain: Eukaryota
- Kingdom: Animalia
- Phylum: Platyhelminthes
- Order: Polycladida
- Family: Prosthiostomidae
- Genus: Amakusaplana (Kato 1938)

Species
- See text

Genus of flatworms

Amakusaplana is a genus of free-living marine polyclad flatworms in the family Prosthiostomidae.

== Species ==
- Amakusaplana acroporae
- Amakusaplana ohshimai
