= Three stripes (disambiguation) =

Three stripes is a trademark of Adidas

Three stripes or Three stripe may also refer to:

- Three Stripe Records, label of Smith & Mighty
- Three-Stripe Painter, name given by Arthur Dale Trendall to classical fish plate painter
- The Neo-Druid symbol of Awen
- Three Stripes (album), a 2017 album by R&B group, Bell Biv DeVoe

== Fish ==
- Threestripe corydoras or leopard catfish, Corydoras trilineatus
- Three stripe damsel or whitetail dascyllus, Dascyllus aruanus
- Three-stripe doris, Chromodoris macfarlandi
- Three-stripe fusilier, Pterocaesio trilineata, a fish of the family Caesionidae
- Three-striped tigerfish, Terapon jarbua
