= Felimida ponga =

Scientific classification
- Kingdom: Animalia
- Phylum: Mollusca
- Class: Gastropoda
- Order: Nudibranchia
- Family: Chromodorididae
- Genus: Felimida
- Species: F. ponga

Binomial name
- Felimida ponga (Er. Marcus & Ev. Marcus, 1970)

Synonyms
- Chromodoris ponga Er. Marcus & Ev. Marcus, 1970 (basionym)

Species of gastropod

Felimida ponga is a species of colourful sea slug, a dorid nudibranch, a marine gastropod mollusk in the family Chromodorididae.

== Description ==
The maximum recorded body length is 10 mm.

== Habitat ==
Minimum recorded depth is 10 m. Maximum recorded depth is 10 m.
