= Felimida ruzafai =

Scientific classification
- Kingdom: Animalia
- Phylum: Mollusca
- Class: Gastropoda
- Order: Nudibranchia
- Family: Chromodorididae
- Genus: Felimida
- Species: F. ruzafai

Binomial name
- Felimida ruzafai (Ortea, Bacallado, & Valdes, 1992)

Synonyms
- Chromodoris ruzafai Ortea, Bacallado & Valdés, 1992 (basionym)

Species of gastropod

Felimida ruzafai is a species of colorful sea slug, a dorid nudibranch, a marine gastropod mollusk in the family Chromodorididae.

== Description ==
The length of the body attains 30 mm.

== Distribution ==
This species occurs in the Pacific Ocean off the Galapagos Islands.
