= Felimida regalis =

Scientific classification
- Kingdom: Animalia
- Phylum: Mollusca
- Class: Gastropoda
- Order: Nudibranchia
- Family: Chromodorididae
- Genus: Felimida
- Species: F. regalis

Binomial name
- Felimida regalis (Ortea, Caballer & Moro, 2001)

Synonyms
- Chromodoris regalis (Ortea, Caballer & Moro, 2001); Noumea regalis Ortea, Caballer & Moro, 2001 (basionym)

Species of gastropod

== Physical traits and location ==
Felimida regalis is a species of colorful sea slug, a dorid nudibranch, a marine gastropod mollusk in the family Chromodorididae.

They have no shell and are known for their striking coloration and chemical defenses.

Felimida regalis is noted for its bright and contrasting coloration, typically featuring a dark or bluish body with yellow, orange, or pale longitudinal markings. The mantle edge is often highlighted by a distinct colored border. Like other chromodorid nudibranchs, it has external gills arranged in a rosette at the rear of the body and rhinophores on the head used for chemosensory detection.

Felimida regalis feeds primarily on sponges, from which it derives secondary metabolites used as chemical defenses. These compounds are stored in its tissues, making it distasteful or toxic to predators.

Felimida regalis is a nudibrach, meaning it is a sea slug.

As with other nudibranchs, it is hermaphroditic, possessing both male and female reproductive organs, though mating still requires a partner.

The species epithet regalis comes from Latin, meaning “royal”, likely referencing the animal’s vivid, ornate coloration.

The recorded length of the body varies between 13 mm. and 35 mm.

== Habitat ==
Minimum recorded depth is 9 m. Maximum recorded depth is 9 m.

This species occurs in the Caribbean Sea off Costa Rica.

This species is found in the western Atlantic, including parts of the Caribbean Sea and the Gulf of Mexico. It inhabits shallow to moderate depths on coral reefs and rocky substrates, where it crawls openly across hard surfaces.
