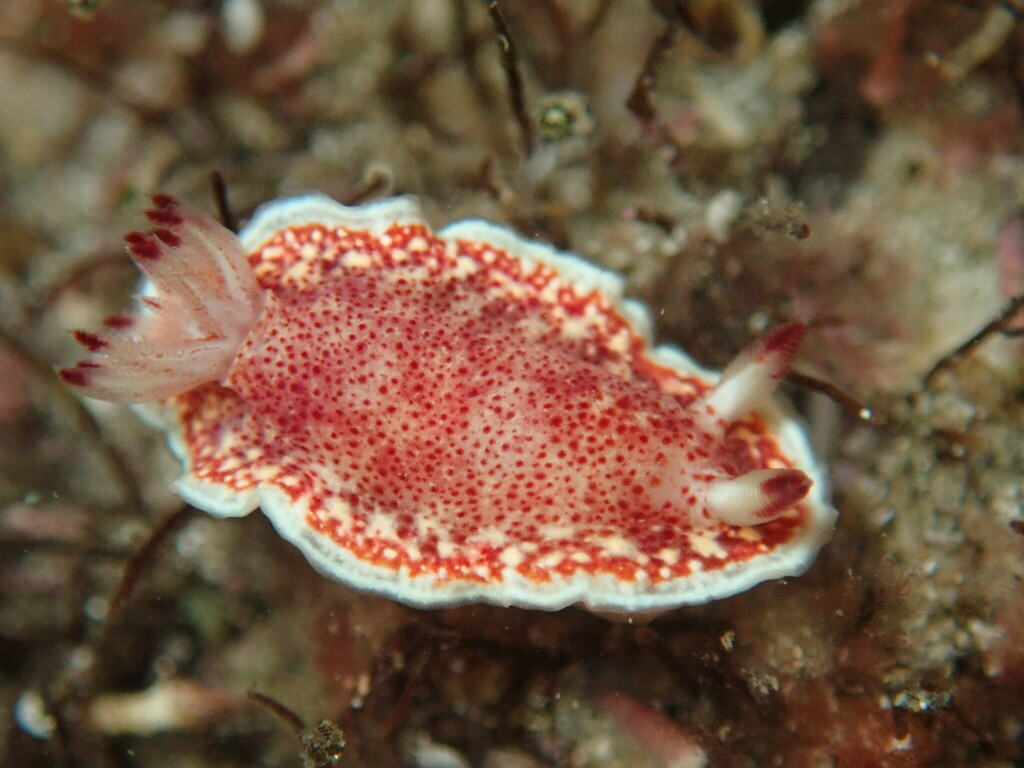

Scientific classification
- Kingdom: Animalia
- Phylum: Mollusca
- Class: Gastropoda
- Order: Nudibranchia
- Family: Chromodorididae
- Genus: Felimida
- Species: F. baumanni

Binomial name
- Felimida baumanni (Bertsch, 1970)

Synonyms
- Chromodoris baumanni Bertsch, 1970 (basionym); Glossodoris baumanni (Bertsch, 1970)

= Felimida baumanni =

Species of gastropod

Felimida baumanni is a species of colorful sea slug, a dorid nudibranch, a marine gastropod mollusk in the family Chromodorididae.

== Distribution ==
This species was first described from Isla San Francisco, Baja California. It is reported from southern Mexico, Central America and the Galapagos Islands.

== Description ==
The mantle of Felimida baumanni is white with small red spots and a broken band of orange near the edge.
