= Felimida elegantula =

Scientific classification
- Kingdom: Animalia
- Phylum: Mollusca
- Class: Gastropoda
- Order: Nudibranchia
- Family: Chromodorididae
- Genus: Felimida
- Species: F. elegantula

Binomial name
- Felimida elegantula (Philippi, 1844)

Species of gastropod

Felimida elegantula is a species of colourful sea slug, a dorid nudibranch, a marine gastropod mollusc in the family Chromodorididae.
