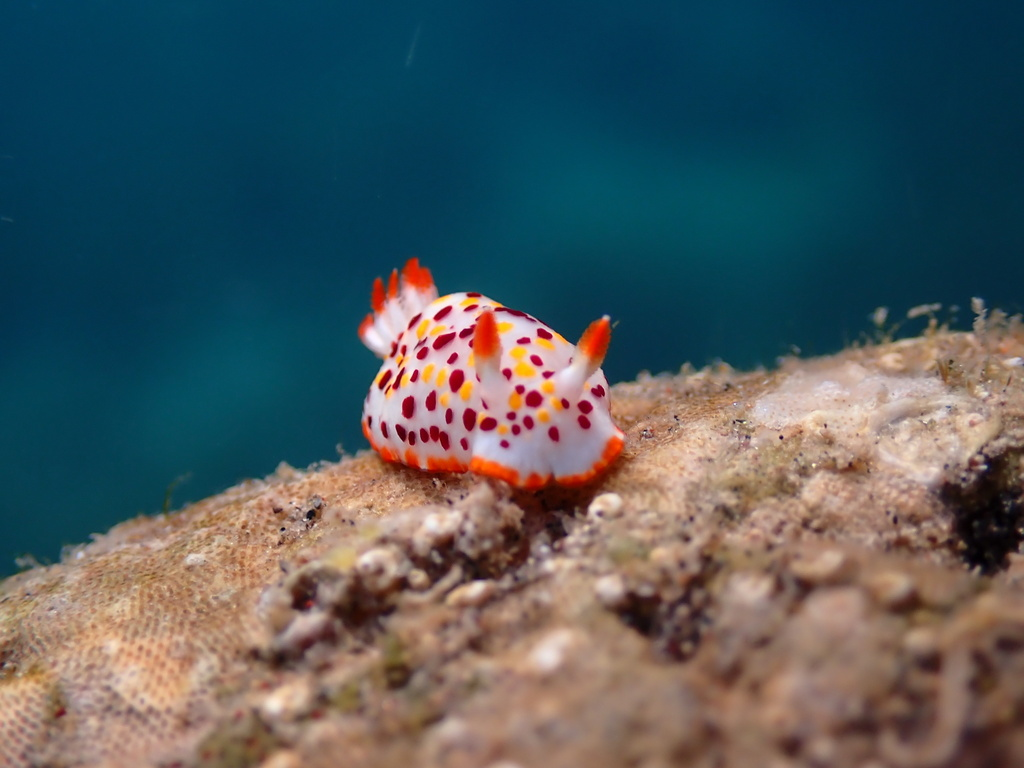

Scientific classification
- Kingdom: Animalia
- Phylum: Mollusca
- Class: Gastropoda
- Order: Nudibranchia
- Family: Chromodorididae
- Genus: Felimida
- Species: F. norrisi

Binomial name
- Felimida norrisi (Farmer, 1963)

Synonyms
- Chromodoris norrisi Farmer, 1963 (basionym); Glossodoris norrisi (Farmer, 1963)

= Felimida norrisi =

Species of gastropod

Felimida norrisi also known as Norris Chromodorid is a species of colorful sea slug, a dorid nudibranch, a marine gastropod mollusk in the family Chromodorididae.

== Description ==
The body grows to a length of 60 mm.

== Distribution ==
This species occurs in the Pacific Ocean from Baja California, Mexico to Costa Rica.
