= Felimida socorroensis =

Scientific classification
- Kingdom: Animalia
- Phylum: Mollusca
- Class: Gastropoda
- Order: Nudibranchia
- Family: Chromodorididae
- Genus: Felimida
- Species: F. socorroensis

Binomial name
- Felimida socorroensis (Behrens, Gosliner & Hermosillo, 2009)

Synonyms
- Chromodoris socorroensis Behrens, Gosliner & Hermosillo, 2009 (basionym)

Species of gastropod

Felimida socorroensis is a species of colourful sea slug, a dorid nudibranch, a marine gastropod mollusc in the family Chromodorididae.

== Distribution ==
The holotype of this species was collected at Cabo Pierce, Isla Socorro, 18.77784°N 110.907194°W, Revillagigedo Islands, Mexico. Additional specimens included in the original description came from Isla Socorro and Isla San Benedicto. It is an eastern Pacific Ocean endemic.
