= Felimida ghanensis =

Scientific classification
- Domain: Eukaryota
- Kingdom: Animalia
- Phylum: Mollusca
- Class: Gastropoda
- Order: Nudibranchia
- Family: Chromodorididae
- Genus: Felimida
- Species: F. ghanensis

Binomial name
- Felimida ghanensis (Edmunds, 1968)

Synonyms
- Glossodoris ghanensis Edmunds, 1968 (basionym)

Species of gastropod

Felimida ghanensis is a species of sea slug, a dorid nudibranch, a shell-less marine gastropod mollusk in the family Chromodorididae.

== Distribution ==
This sponge-eating species is found in the Eastern Atlantic Ocean around Ghana, the Canary Islands and the Azores.
