= Chromolaichma dalli =

Scientific classification
- Kingdom: Animalia
- Phylum: Mollusca
- Class: Gastropoda
- Order: Nudibranchia
- Family: Chromodorididae
- Subfamily: Chromodoridinae
- Genus: Chromolaichma
- Species: C. dalli

Binomial name
- Chromolaichma dalli (Bergh, 1879)

Synonyms
- Chromodoris banksi Farmer, 1963; Chromodoris banksi banksi Farmer, 1963; Chromodoris banksi sonora Ev. Marcus & Er. Marcus, 1967; Chromodoris dalli Bergh, 1879; Chromodoris sonora Ev. Marcus & Er. Marcus, 1967; Felimida dalli Bergh, 1879; Glossodoris dalli Bergh, 1879

Species of gastropod

Chromolaichma dalli is a species of sea slug, a dorid nudibranch, a shell-less marine gastropod mollusk in the family Chromodorididae.

== Distribution ==
This species is found in the Tropical Eastern Pacific Ocean from Baja California to the Galapagos Islands.

== Ecology ==
Chromolaichma dalli feeds on sponge Hyrtios erecta. cf.
