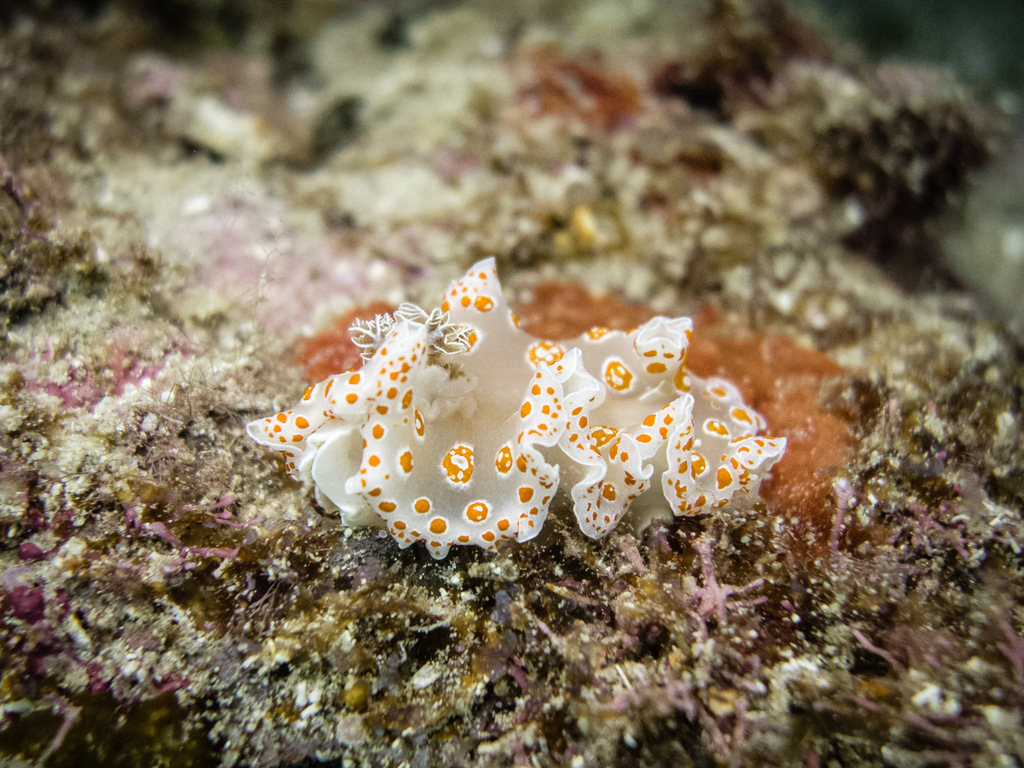

Scientific classification
- Kingdom: Animalia
- Phylum: Mollusca
- Class: Gastropoda
- Order: Nudibranchia
- Family: Chromodorididae
- Genus: Felimida
- Species: F. marislae

Binomial name
- Felimida marislae (Bertsch in Bertsch, Ferreira, Farmer, & Hayes, 1973)

Synonyms
- Chromodoris marislae Bertsch, 1973 (basionym)

= Felimida marislae =

Species of gastropod

Felimida marislae is a species of colorful sea slug, a dorid nudibranch, a marine gastropod mollusk in the family Chromodorididae.

== Description ==
The body grows to a length of 70 mm.

== Distribution ==
This species occurs in the Pacific Ocean from Baja California to Panama.
