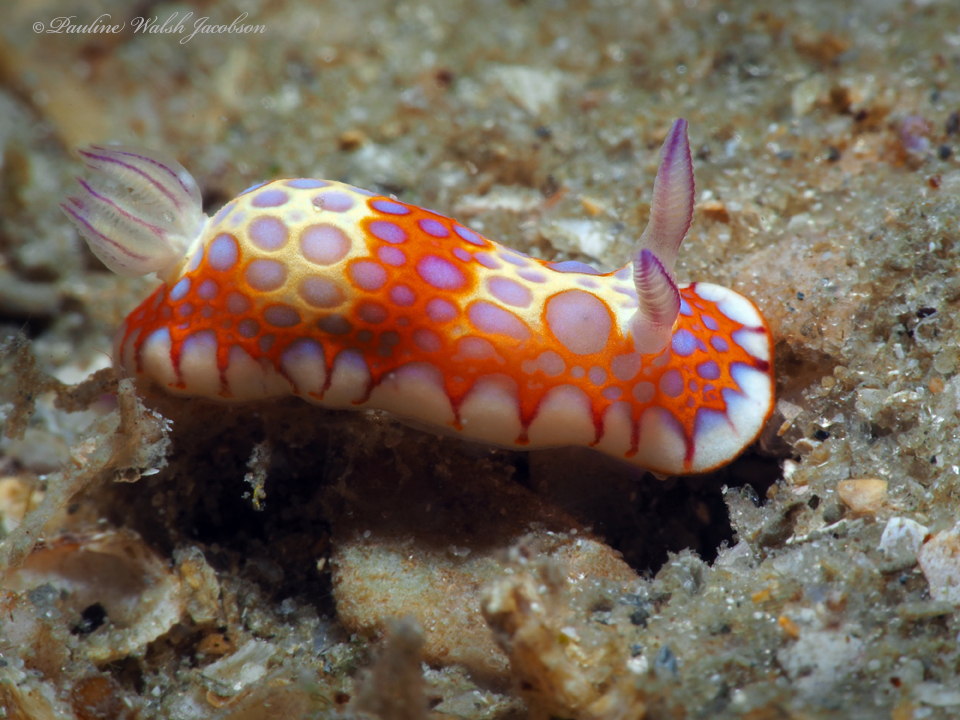
- Felimida binza from Florida

Scientific classification
- Domain: Eukaryota
- Kingdom: Animalia
- Phylum: Mollusca
- Class: Gastropoda
- Order: Nudibranchia
- Family: Chromodorididae
- Genus: Felimida
- Species: F. binza

Binomial name
- Felimida binza (Ev. Marcus & Er. Marcus, 1963)

Synonyms
- Chromodoris binza Ev. Marcus & Er. Marcus, 1963 (basionym)

= Felimida binza =

Species of gastropod

Felimida binza or the harlequin sea goddess is a species of colorful sea slug, a dorid nudibranch, a marine gastropod mollusk in the family Chromodorididae.

== Distribution ==
This marine species occurs off Florida to Brazil.

== Description ==
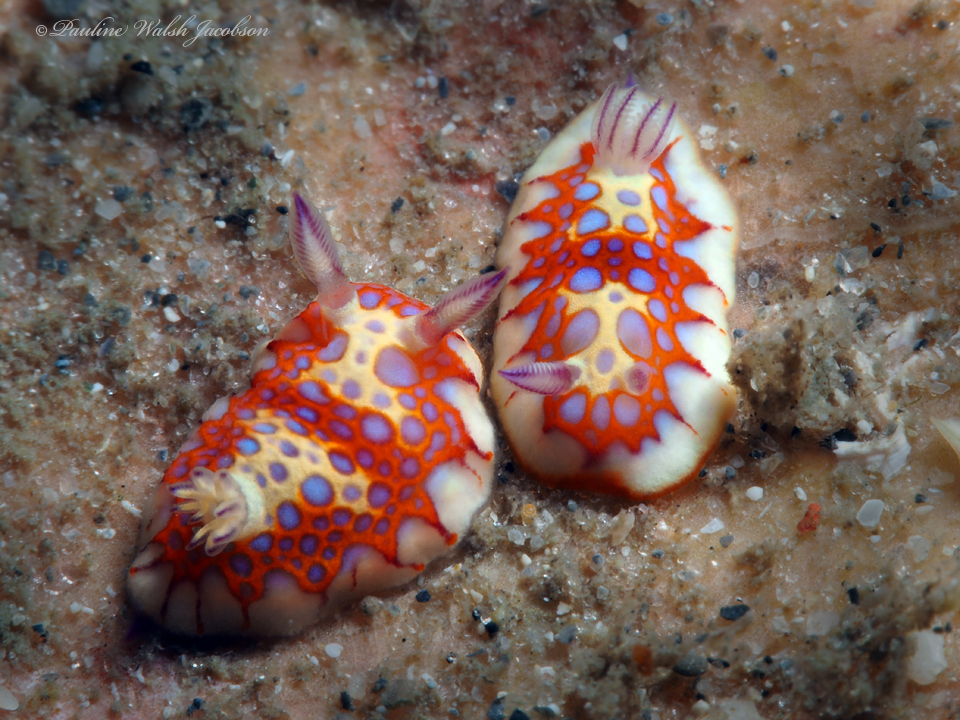
Florida

The maximum recorded length is 30 mm.

== Ecology ==
Minimum recorded depth is 0 m. Maximum recorded depth is 0 m.

Prey of Felimida binza includes sponge Chelonaplysilla erecta.
