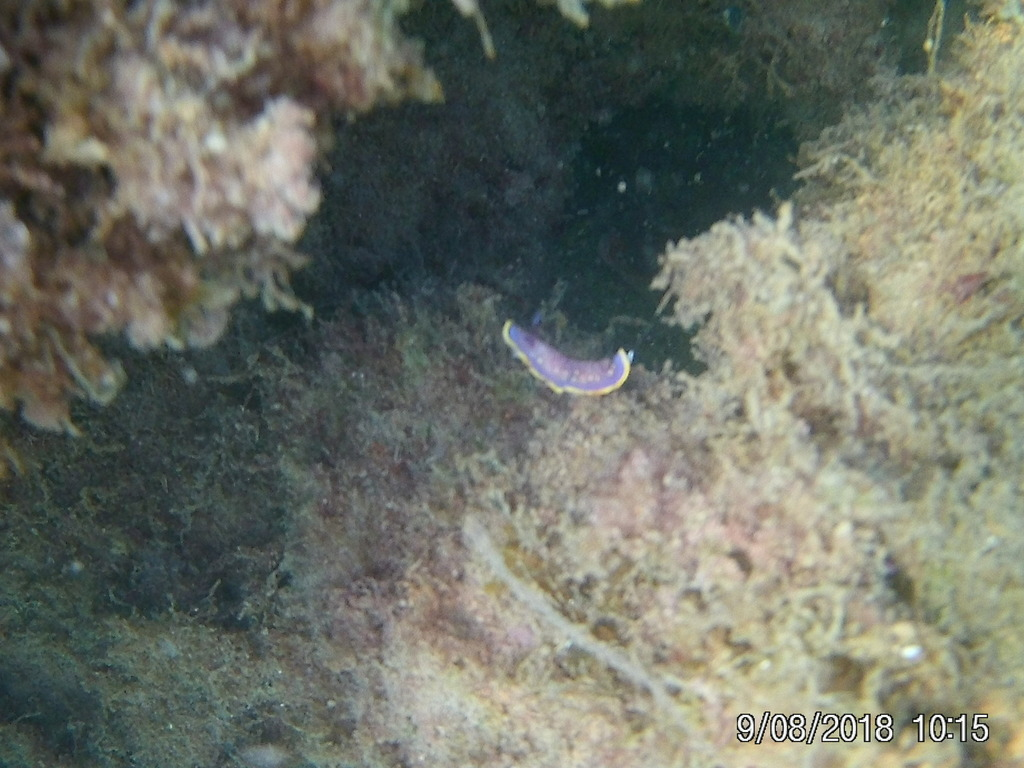

Scientific classification
- Kingdom: Animalia
- Phylum: Mollusca
- Class: Gastropoda
- Order: Nudibranchia
- Family: Chromodorididae
- Genus: Felimida
- Species: F. luteopunctata

Binomial name
- Felimida luteopunctata (Gantes, 1962)

Synonyms
- Chromodoris luteopunctata (Gantès, 1962); Glossodoris luteopunctata Gantès, 1962 (basionym)

= Felimida luteopunctata =

Species of gastropod

Felimida luteopunctata is a species of colorful sea slug, a dorid nudibranch, a marine gastropod mollusk in the family Chromodorididae.

== Description ==
The body reaches a length of 25 mm.

== Distribution ==
This marine species occurs in the Atlantic Ocean from Portugal and Southern Spain to Senegal.
