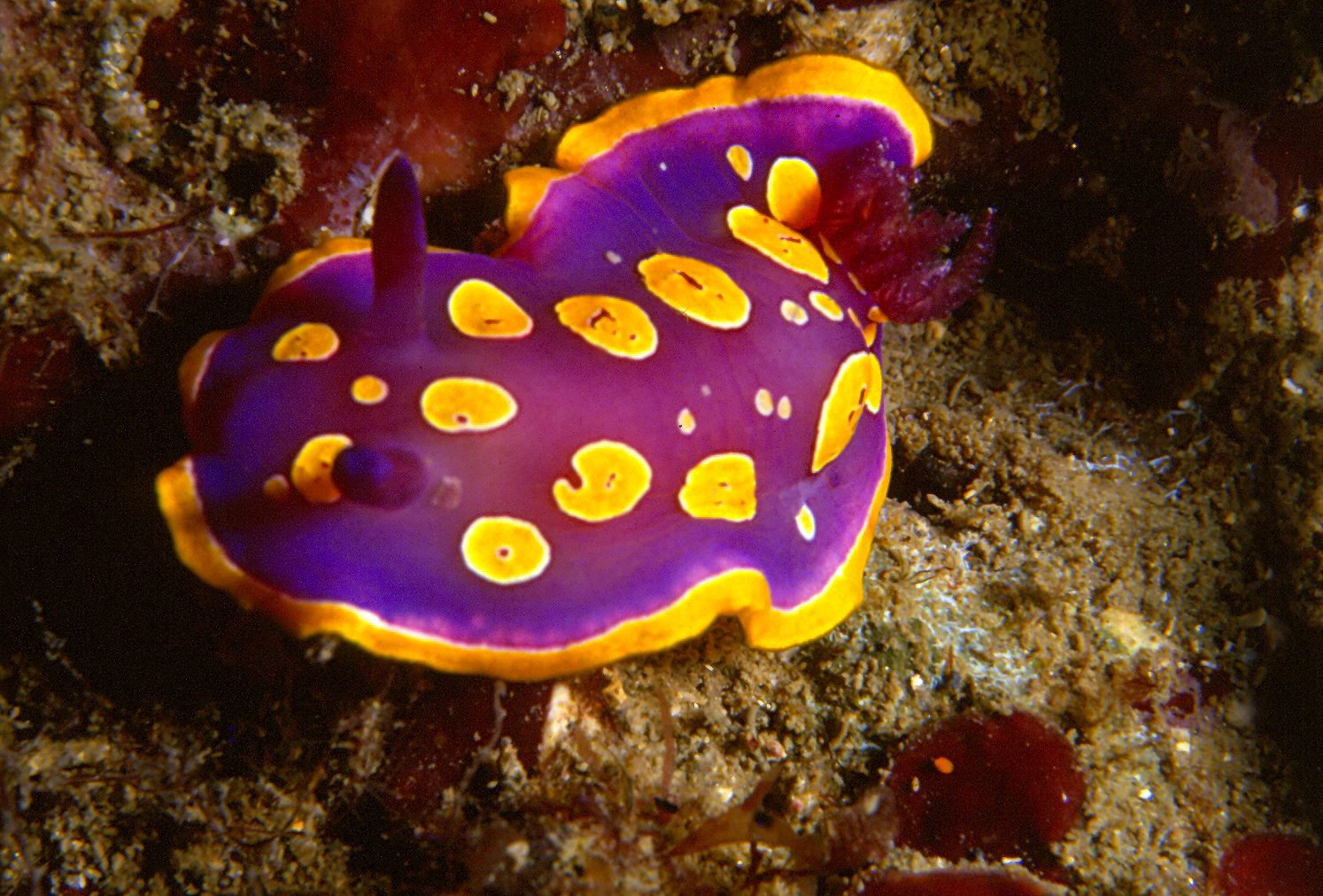

Scientific classification
- Kingdom: Animalia
- Phylum: Mollusca
- Class: Gastropoda
- Order: Nudibranchia
- Family: Chromodorididae
- Genus: Felimida
- Species: F. luteorosea

Binomial name
- Felimida luteorosea (Rapp, 1827)

Synonyms
- Chromodoris daphne Angas, G.F., 1864; Chromodoris iheringi Bergh, 1879; Chromodoris luteorosea (Rapp, 1827); Doris luteorosea Rapp, 1827 (basionym); Doris lutescens Chiaje, S. delle, 1841; Doris nardii Vérany, J.B., 1846; Hypselodoris picta Schultz in Philippi, R.A., 1836

= Felimida luteorosea =

Species of gastropod

Felimida luteorosea is a species of colorful sea slug, a dorid nudibranch, a marine gastropod mollusk in the family Chromodorididae.

== Description ==
The length of the body varies between 30 mm and 55 mm. The body and cephalic tentacles are a vibrant purple, with a golden yellow along the edge of the foot and spotted along the mantle and notum.

- Animalia (Kingdom)
- Mollusca (Phylum)
- Gastropoda (Class)
- Heterobranchia (Subclass)
- Euthyneura (Infraclass)
- Ringipleura (Subterclass)
- Nudipleura (Superorder)
- Nudibranchia (Order)
- Doridina (Suborder)
- Doridoidei (Infraorder)
- Chromodoridoidea (Superfamily)
- Chromodorididae (Family)
- Chromodoridinae (Subfamily)
- Felimida (Genus)
- Felimida luteorosea (Species)

== Distribution ==
This species occurs in European waters (Spain and Portugal), the Mediterranean Sea (Greece and Gulf of Trieste in Northern Adriatic Sea) and in the Atlantic Ocean off Angola.
