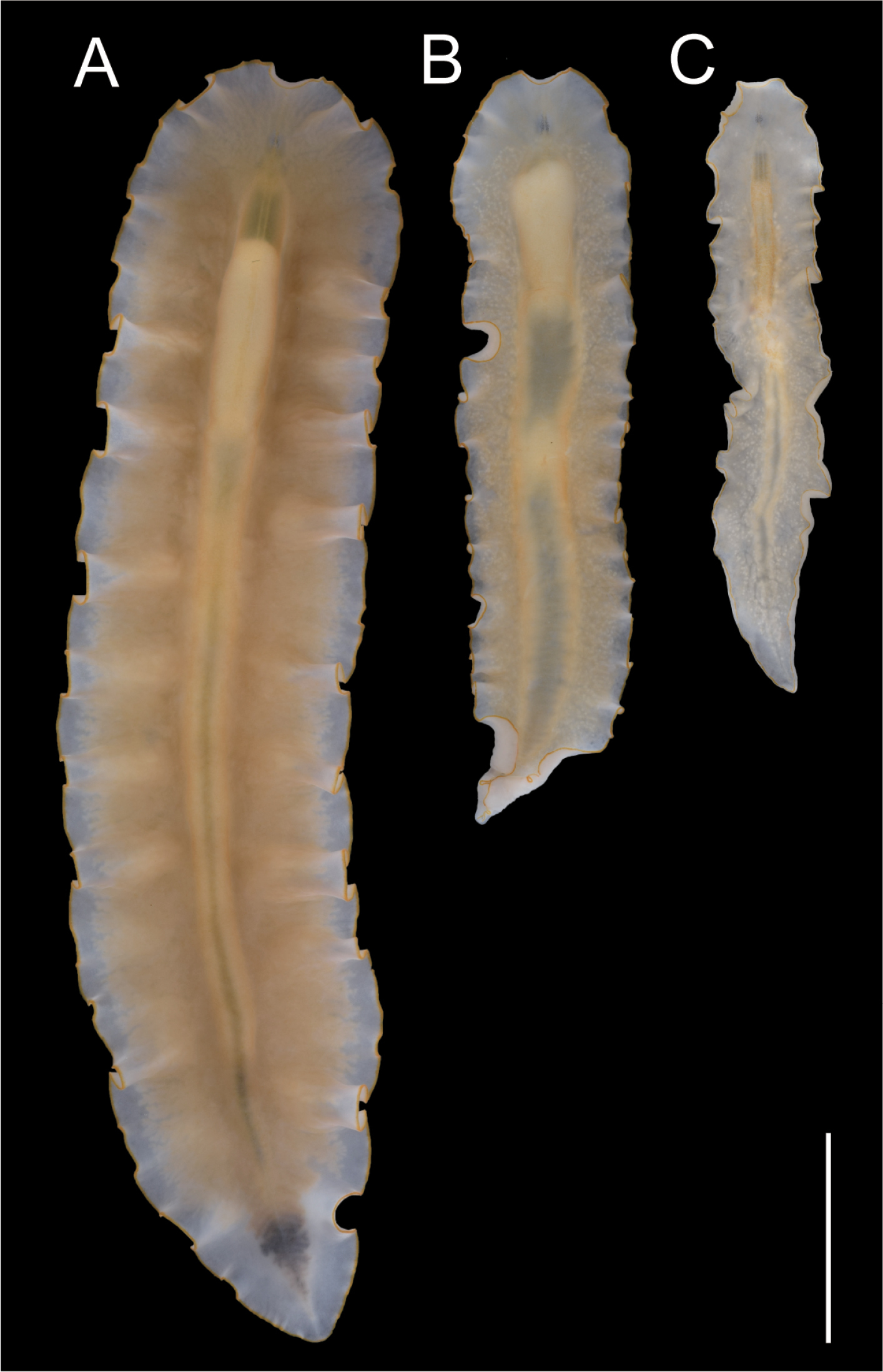
- Specimens of Enchiridium daidai, showing difference in mature body size

Scientific classification
- Kingdom: Animalia
- Phylum: Platyhelminthes
- Order: Polycladida
- Suborder: Cotylea
- Family: Prosthiostomidae
- Genus: Enchiridium; Bock, 1913

Type species
- Enchiridium periommatum Bock, 1913

= Enchiridium =

Genus of flatworms

Enchiridium is a genus of flatworms in the family Prosthiostomidae.

== Taxonomy ==
The following species are recognised in the genus Enchiridium:

- E. daidai Tsuyuki & Kajihara, 2020
- E. delicatum (Palombi, 1939)
- E. evelinae Marcus, 1949
- E. gabriellae (Marcus, 1949)
- E. japonicum Kato, 1943
- E. magec Cuadrado, Moro & Norena, 2017
- E. periommatum Bock, 1913
- E. punctatum Hyman, 1953
- E. russoi (Palombi, 1939)
