= Felimida goslineri =

Scientific classification
- Kingdom: Animalia
- Phylum: Mollusca
- Class: Gastropoda
- Order: Nudibranchia
- Family: Chromodorididae
- Genus: Felimida
- Species: F. goslineri

Binomial name
- Felimida goslineri (Ortea & Valdés, 1996)

Synonyms
- Chromodoris goslineri Ortea & Valdés, 1996 (basionym)

Species of gastropod

Felimida goslineri is a species of colourful sea slug, a dorid nudibranch, a marine gastropod mollusk in the family Chromodorididae.

== Distribution ==
This species occurs in the Atlantic Ocean off the Azores.
