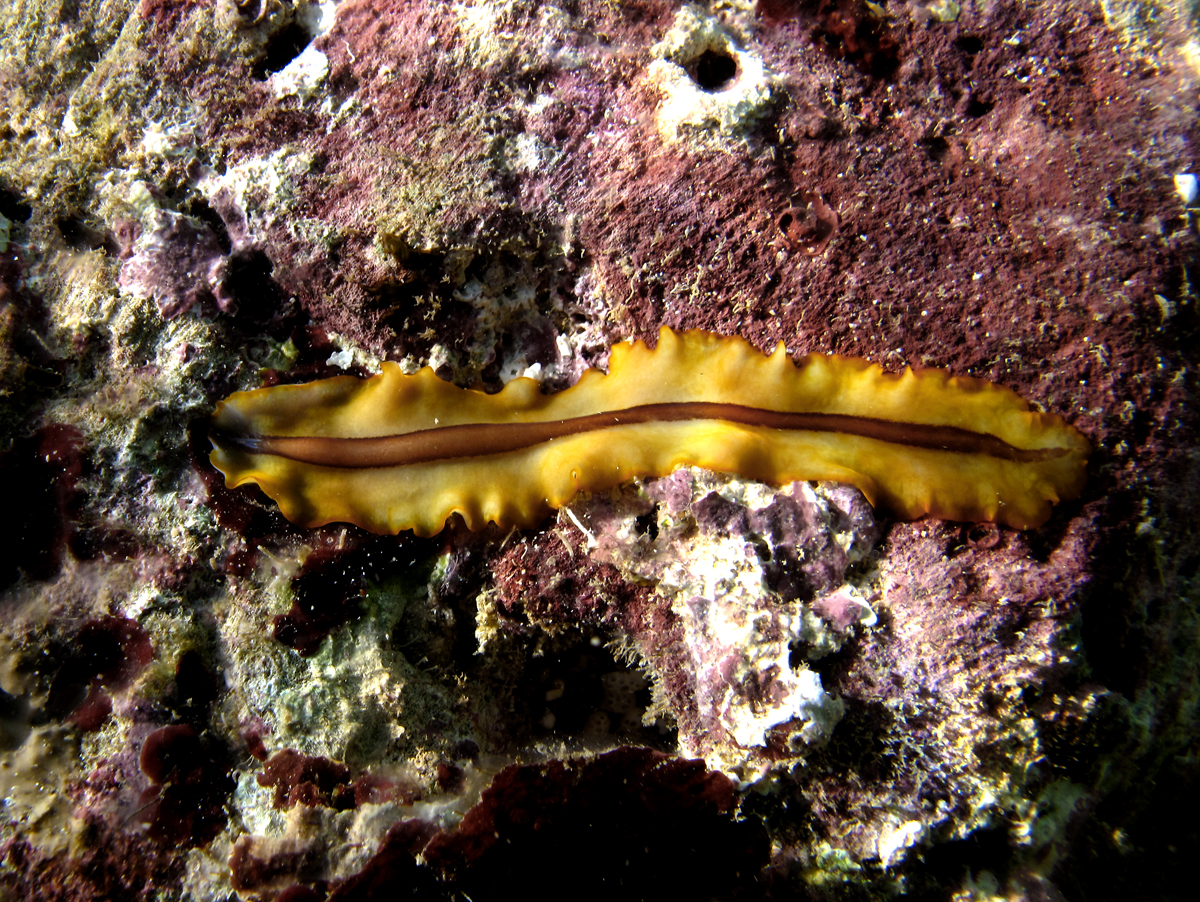

Scientific classification
- Kingdom: Animalia
- Phylum: Platyhelminthes
- Order: Polycladida
- Suborder: Cotylea
- Family: Prosthiostomidae; Lang, 1884

= Prosthiostomidae =

Family of flatworms

Prosthiostomidae is a family of free-living marine polyclad flatworms in the suborder Cotylea.

== Genera ==
- Enchiridium Bock, 1913
- Enterogonimus Hallez, 1913
- Euprosthiostomum Bock, 1925
- Lurymare Er. Marcus & Ev. Marcus, 1968
- Prosthiostomum Quatrefage, 1845
