= Felimida punctilucens =

Scientific classification
- Kingdom: Animalia
- Phylum: Mollusca
- Class: Gastropoda
- Order: Nudibranchia
- Family: Chromodorididae
- Genus: Felimida
- Species: F. punctilucens

Binomial name
- Felimida punctilucens (Bergh, 1890)

Synonyms
- Chromodoris punctilucens Bergh, 1890 (original combination); Chromolaichma punctilucens (Bergh, 1890); Glossodoris punctilucens (Bergh, 1890)

Species of gastropod

Felimida punctilucens is a species of colorful sea slug, a dorid nudibranch, a marine gastropod mollusk in the family Chromodorididae.

== Description ==
The maximum recorded body length is 35 mm.

== Habitat ==
Minimum recorded depth is 68 m. Maximum recorded depth is 68 m.
