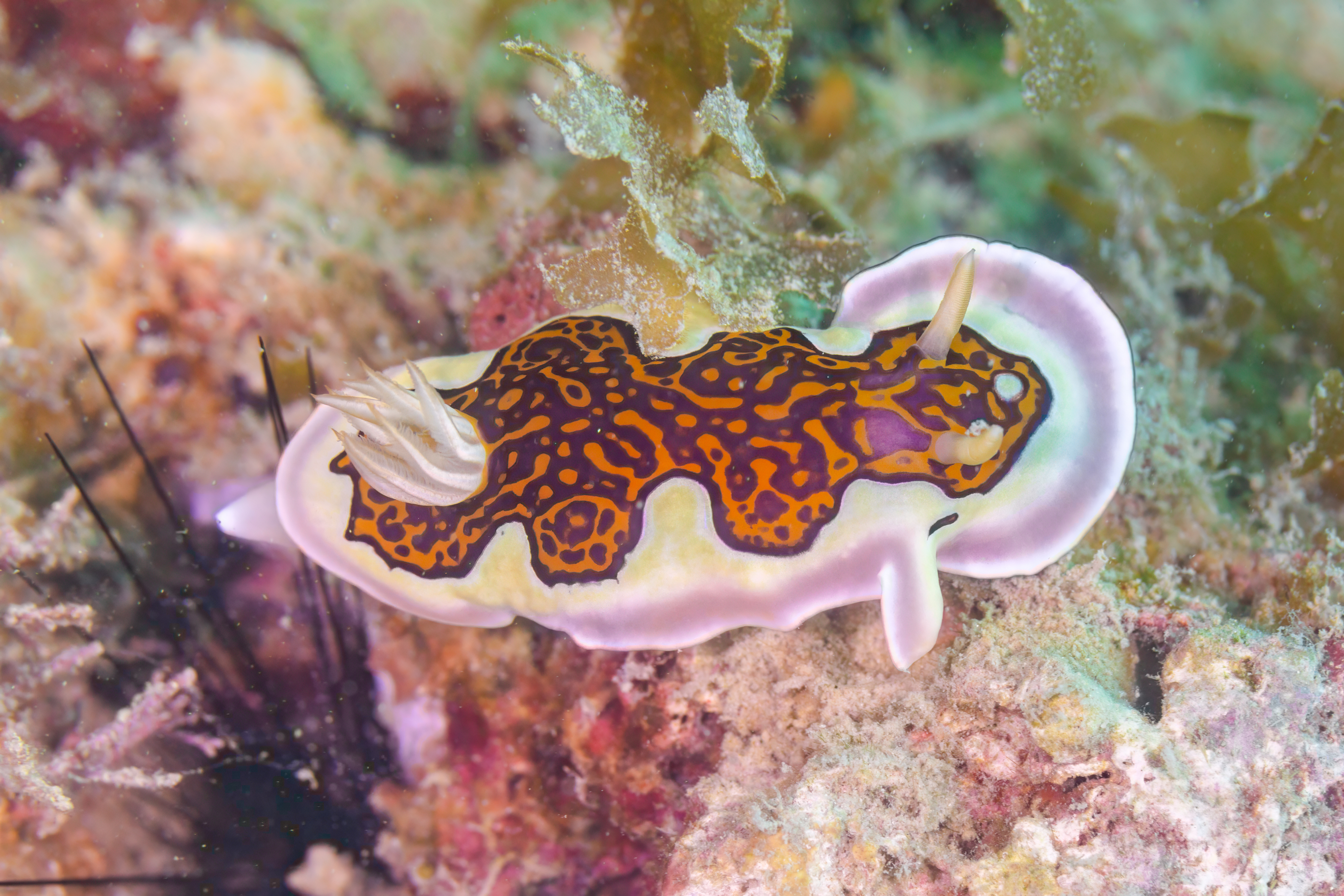
- Goniobranchus gleniei, Zanzibar, Tanzania

Scientific classification
- Kingdom: Animalia
- Phylum: Mollusca
- Class: Gastropoda
- Order: Nudibranchia
- Family: Chromodorididae
- Genus: Goniobranchus
- Species: G. gleniei

Binomial name
- Goniobranchus gleniei (Kelaart, 1858)

Synonyms
- Chromodoris gleniei (Kelaart, 1858); Doris gleniei Kelaart, 1858 (basionym)

= Goniobranchus gleniei =

Species of gastropod

Goniobranchus gleniei is a species of colourful sea slug, a dorid nudibranch, a marine gastropod mollusc in the family Chromodorididae.

== Distribution ==
This species was described from the inner harbour, Trincomalee and Cottiar, opposite Fort Fredrick, Sri Lanka. It has been reported from the Maldives and Tanzania.

== Description ==
Goniobranchus gleniei is a chromodorid nudibranch with a continuous, sinuous black or deep purple line all round the mantle, outside the gills and rhinophores. The outer part of the mantle is white with a faint submarginal grey line. The inner part of the mantle is golden-brown with irregular black spots.
