= Felimida galexorum =

Scientific classification
- Kingdom: Animalia
- Phylum: Mollusca
- Class: Gastropoda
- Order: Nudibranchia
- Family: Chromodorididae
- Genus: Felimida
- Species: F. galexorum

Binomial name
- Felimida galexorum (Bertsch, 1978)

Synonyms
- Chromodoris galexorum Bertsch, 1978 (basionym)

Species of gastropod

Felimida galexorum is a species of colourful sea slug, a dorid nudibranch, a marine gastropod mollusk in the family Chromodorididae.

== Distribution ==
This species occurs in the Pacific Ocean from Catalina Island, California, USA to the Gulf of California, West Mexico

== Description ==
The body reaches a length of 24 mm.
