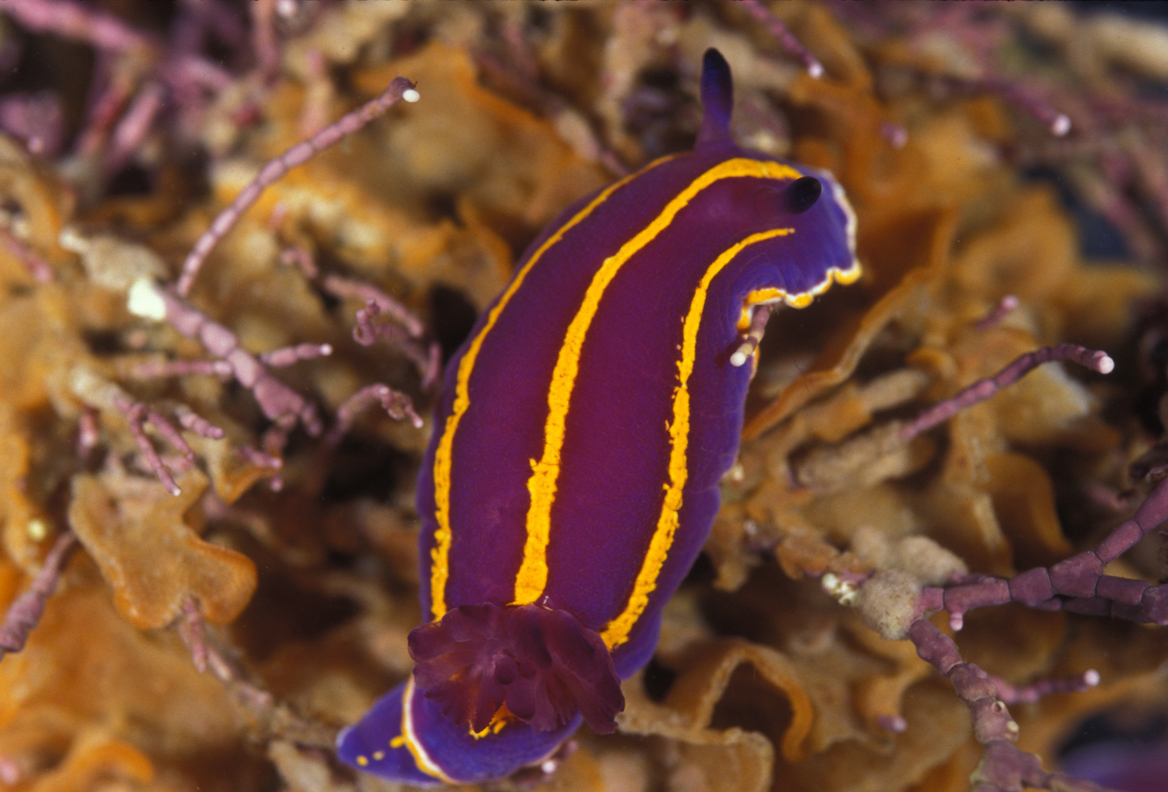

Scientific classification
- Domain: Eukaryota
- Kingdom: Animalia
- Phylum: Mollusca
- Class: Gastropoda
- Order: Nudibranchia
- Family: Chromodorididae
- Genus: Felimida
- Species: F. macfarlandi

Binomial name
- Felimida macfarlandi (Cockerell, 1901)

Synonyms
- Chromodoris mcfarlandi Cockerell, 1901; Glossodoris macfarlandi (Cockerell, 1901)

= Felimida macfarlandi =

Species of gastropod

Felimida macfarlandi, also called Macfarland's nudibranch is a species of colorful sea slug, a dorid nudibranch, a marine gastropod mollusk in the family Chromodorididae.

== Taxonomy ==
This species was first described by Theodore Dru Alison Cockerell in 1901 and named Chromodoris mcfarlandi. Cockerell went on to give a fuller description of this species in 1902. It has also been known as Glossodoris macfarlandi.

== Description ==
The body grows to a length of 44 mm. The slug is purple with orange stripes, sometimes has a short tail that looks like a flower, and two ear-like spots on the side of the head.

== Distribution ==
This species occurs in the Pacific Ocean from Central California, USA to Baja California, Mexico.
