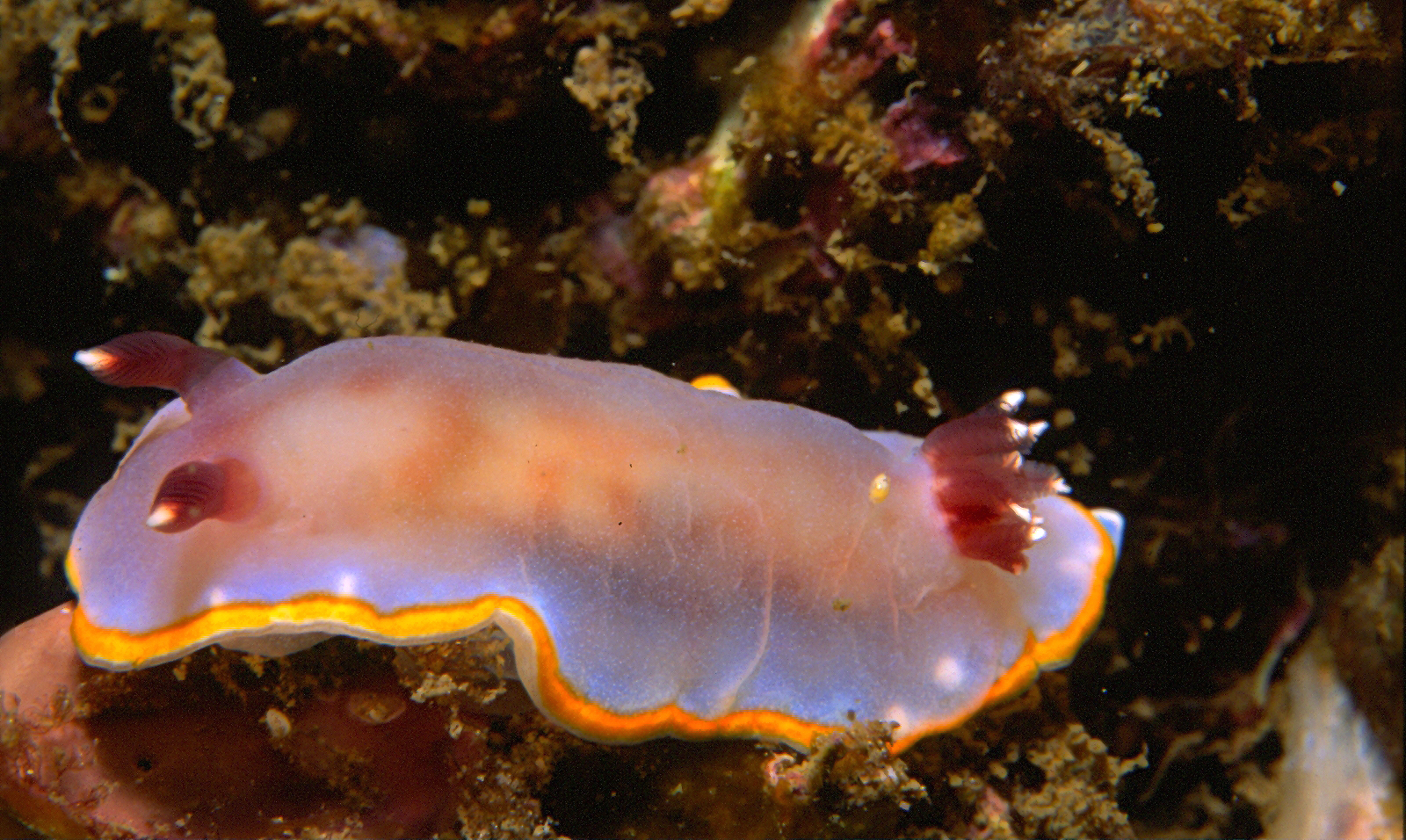
- Rudmania purpurea

Scientific classification
- Kingdom: Animalia
- Phylum: Mollusca
- Class: Gastropoda
- Order: Nudibranchia
- Family: Chromodorididae
- Genus: Rudmania; J. P. G. Oliveira, Henryco, Ardila, Schrödl & Padula, 2025

Type species
- Rudmania purpurea Risso, 1831

= Rudmania =

Genus of gastropods

Rudmania is a genus of sea slugs, dorid nudibranchs, shell-less marine gastropod mollusks in the family Chromodorididae.

== Taxonomic history ==
The genus Rudmania was established containing the species formerly included within the Felimida purpurea clade, a group of slugs within the polyphyletic genus Felimida that share an Atlantic distribution. Through a combination of species delimitation, molecular, and morphological analyses, the F. purpurea clade was identified and investigated, the results of which showed that the clade necessitated the distinction of its own genus.

== Description ==
Rudmania is "characterized by white to purple species, the absence of rachidian teeth, and a thin, very long, and coiled vagina".

== Species ==
Species within Rudmania include"

- Rudmania atlantica Padula, Wirtz & Schrödl, 2017
- Rudmania fentoni A. Valdés, Gatdula, Sheridan & Herrera, 2011
- Rudmania grahami T. E. Thompson, 1980
- Rudmania kpone Edmunds, 1981
- Rudmania krohni Verany, 1846
- Rudmania purpurea Risso, 1831
