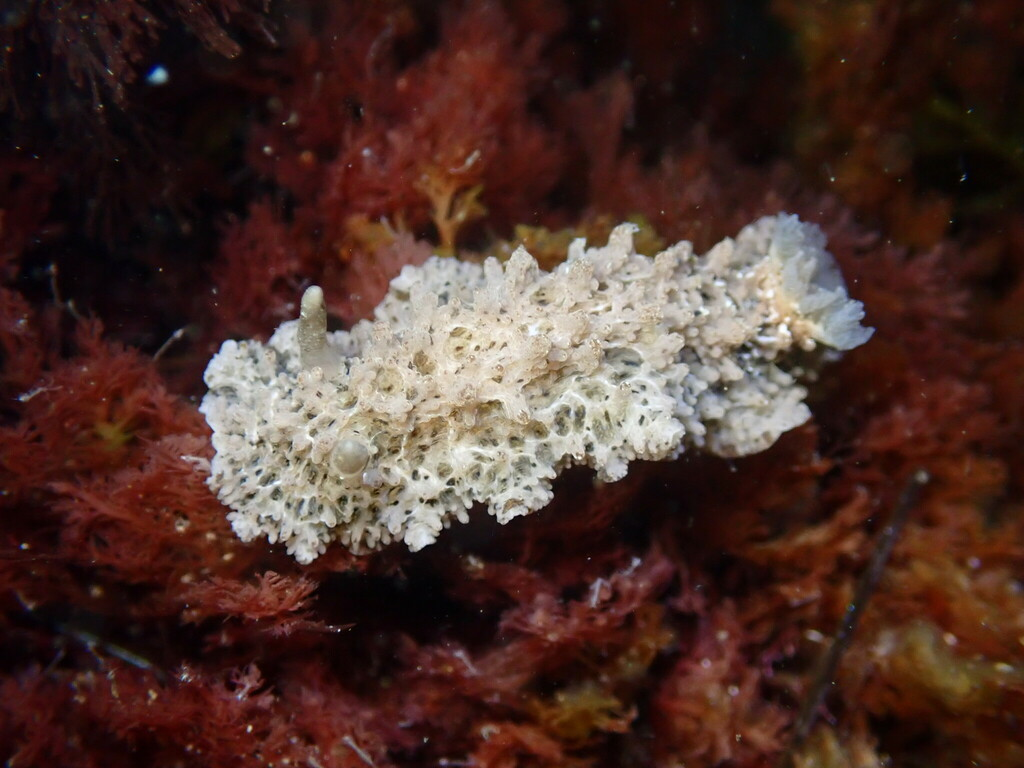

Scientific classification
- Kingdom: Animalia
- Phylum: Mollusca
- Class: Gastropoda
- Order: Nudibranchia
- Family: Dorididae
- Genus: Doris
- Species: D. tanya

Binomial name
- Doris tanya Ev. Marcus, 1971

= Doris tanya =

Species of gastropod

Doris tanya is a species of sea slug, a dorid nudibranch, a marine gastropod mollusc in the family Dorididae. Named after Tanya, Gale G. Sphon's cat.

== Distribution ==
This species was described from California where it is predominantly an intertidal species. It has been redescribed with specimens from Southern California to Panama.
