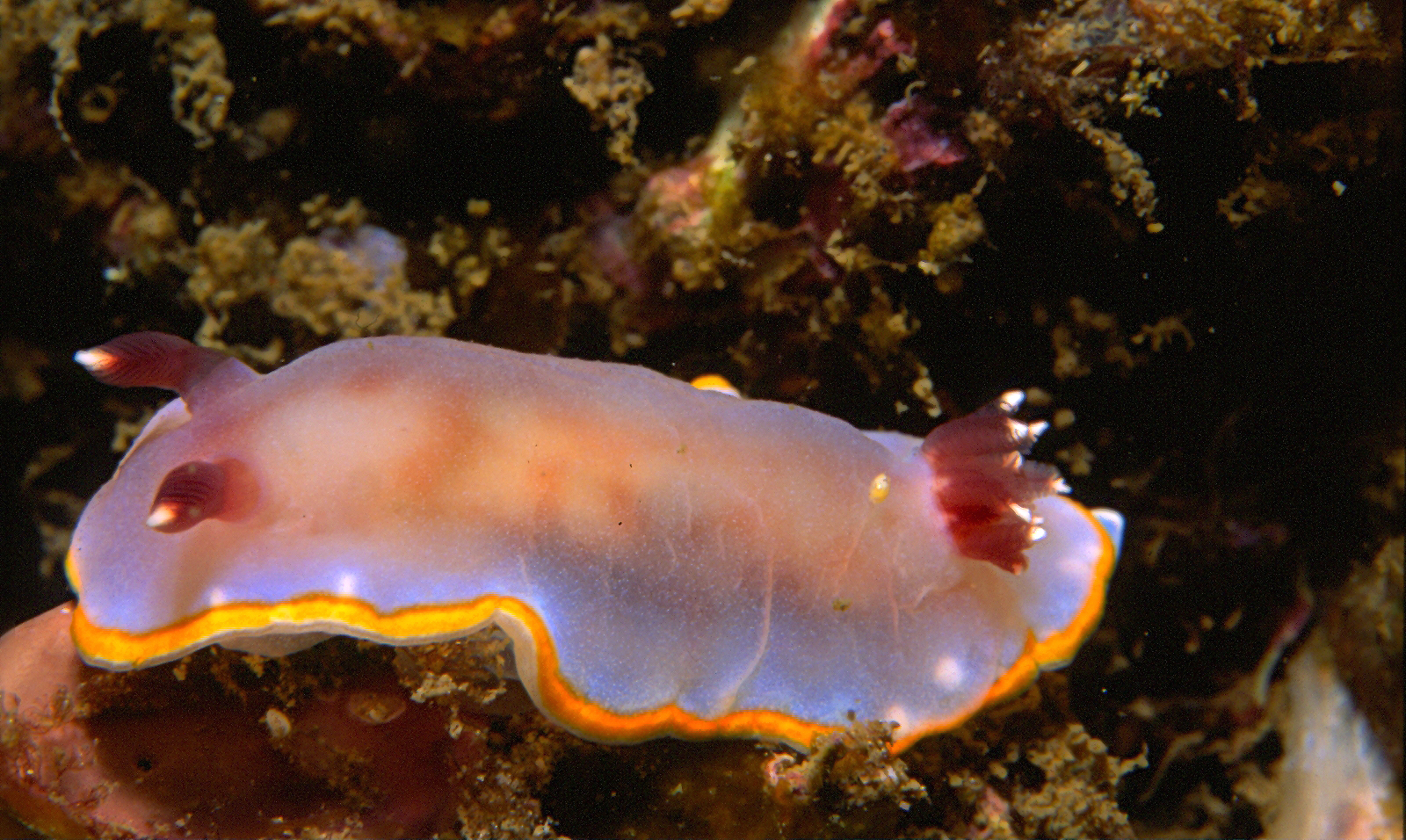

Scientific classification
- Kingdom: Animalia
- Phylum: Mollusca
- Class: Gastropoda
- Order: Nudibranchia
- Family: Chromodorididae
- Genus: Rudmania
- Species: R. purpurea

Binomial name
- Rudmania purpurea (Risso in Guerin, 1831)

Synonyms
- Chromodoris purpurea Risso, 1831; Doris albescens R. A. Philippi, 1836; Doris piraini Vérany, 1846; Doris purpurea Risso, 1831 (basionym); Felimida purpurea Risso, 1831

= Rudmania purpurea =

Species of gastropod

Rudmania purpurea is a species of colourful sea slug, a dorid nudibranch, a marine gastropod mollusc in the family Chromodorididae.

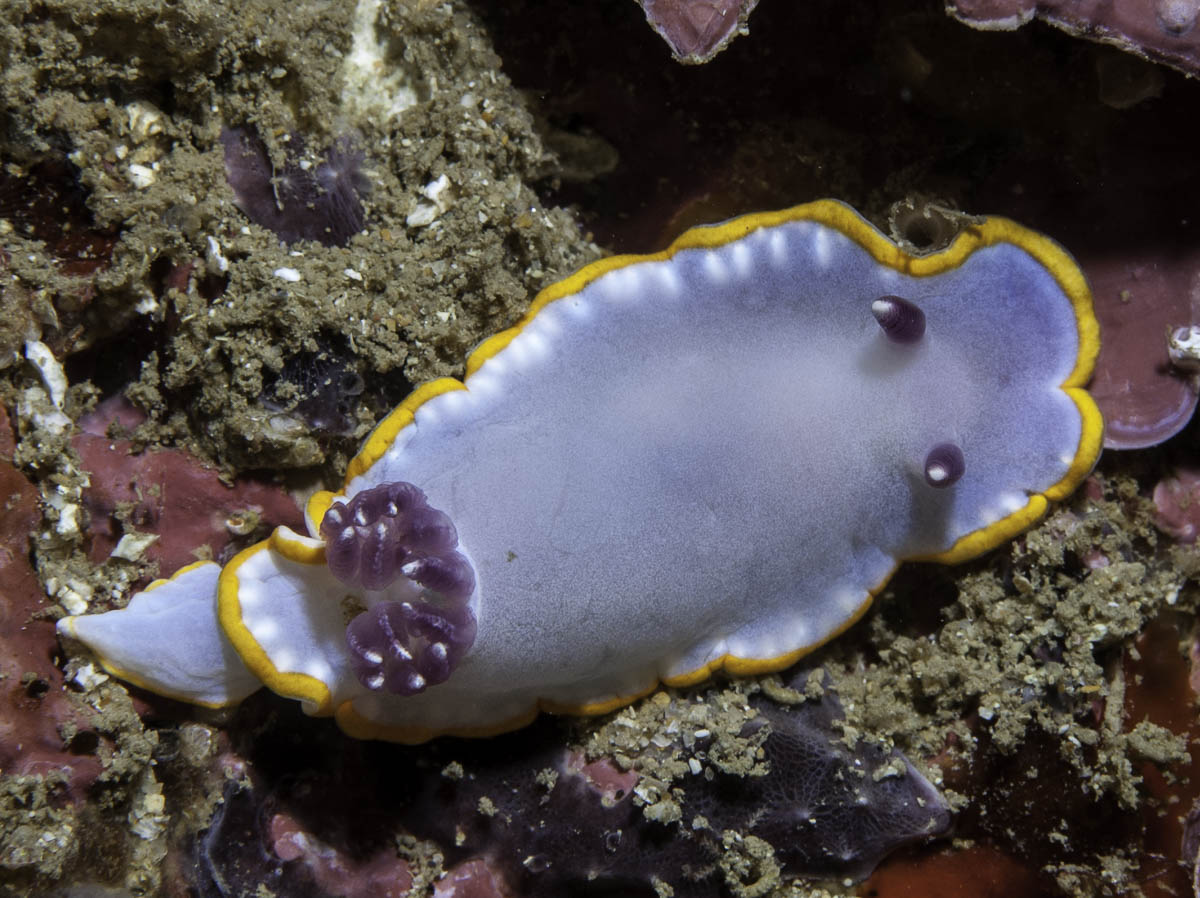
The nudibranch Rudmania purpurea, Sagres, Portugal.

== Distribution ==
This species occurs in the Mediterranean Sea, and on the Atlantic coast of Europe and Africa from the Bay of Biscay to Cape Verde and west as far as the Azores.

== Description ==
Rudmania purpurea is a chromodorid nudibranch with a plain white to pale purple mantle edged with a line of orange-yellow. Inside the yellow margin are conspicuous white mantle glands embedded in the tissue. The rhinophores and gills are purple-pink with white tips. The body length varies between 35 mm and 50 mm.

This species was transferred from the genus Chromodoris to the genus Felimida in a revision of the family Chromodorididae using DNA characters which showed that the Atlantic species of Chromodoris formed a distinct clade. In yet another study in 2025, further molecular and morphological analysis warranted another change of taxonomical designation; the Felimida purpurea clade necessitated the distinction of a new genus, and Rudmania (J. P. G. Oliveira, Henryco, Ardila, Schrödl & Padula, 2025) was established therein.
