= Rudmania atlantica =

Scientific classification
- Kingdom: Animalia
- Phylum: Mollusca
- Class: Gastropoda
- Order: Nudibranchia
- Family: Chromodorididae
- Genus: Rudmania
- Species: R. atlantica

Binomial name
- Rudmania atlantica Padula, Wirtz & Schrödl, 2014

Synonyms
- Felimida atlantica Padula, Wirtz & Schrödl, 2017

Species of gastropod

Rudmania atlantica is a species of sea slug, a dorid nudibranch, a marine gastropod mollusk in the family Chromodorididae.

== Distribution ==
This species was described from Ascension Island, Atlantic Ocean.

== Description ==
The mantle of Rudmania atlantica is white with small yellow spots and a band of yellow-orange at the margin.
