= Rudmania fentoni =

Scientific classification
- Kingdom: Animalia
- Phylum: Mollusca
- Class: Gastropoda
- Order: Nudibranchia
- Family: Chromodorididae
- Genus: Rudmania
- Species: R. fentoni

Binomial name
- Rudmania fentoni (Valdés, Gatdula, Sheridan & Herrera, 2011)

Synonyms
- Chromodoris fentoni Valdés, Gatdula, Sheridan & Herrera, 2011; Felimida fentoni Valdés, Gatdula, Sheridan & Herrera, 2011

Species of gastropod

Rudmania fentoni is a dull coloured species of sea slug or dorid nudibranch, a marine gastropod mollusc in the family Chromodorididae.

== Distribution ==
This species was described from three specimens collected off Pinellas County, Florida, in the Gulf of Mexico, 28.1710°N 83.00200°W.

== Description ==
Rudmania fentoni has a translucent white background colour heavily flecked with dull red-brown and with small yellow spots with orange centres concentrated towards the edge of the mantle. There is a very thin orange-yellow submarginal line around the mantle.

== Ecology ==
The specimens were collected feeding on the sponge Igernella notabilis.
