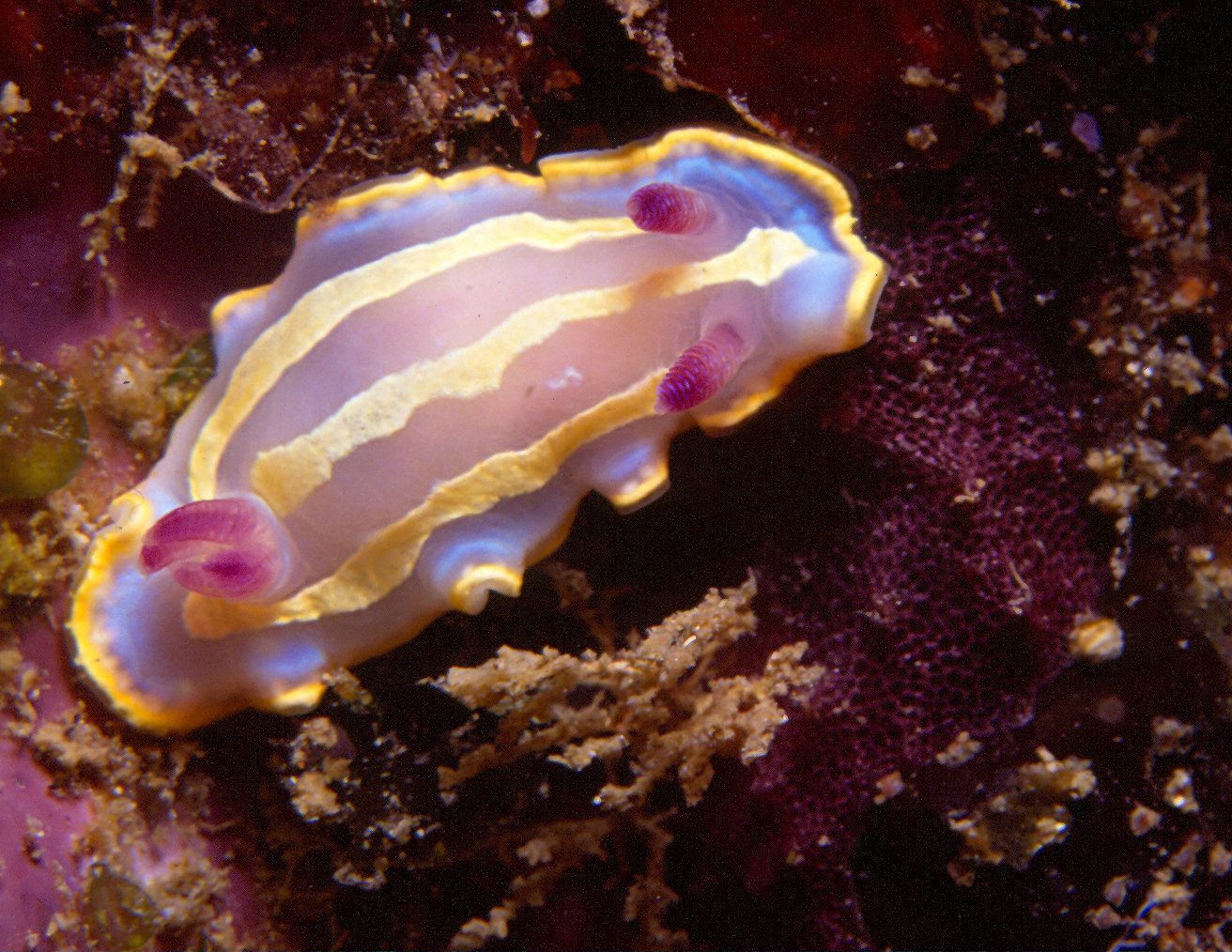

Scientific classification
- Kingdom: Animalia
- Phylum: Mollusca
- Class: Gastropoda
- Order: Nudibranchia
- Family: Chromodorididae
- Genus: Rudmania
- Species: R. krohni

Binomial name
- Rudmania krohni (Vérany, 1846)

Synonyms
- Chromodoris krohni Vérany, 1846; Chromodoris trilineata Ihering, 1880; Doris krohni Vérany, 1846 (basionym); Felimida krohni Vérany, 1846

= Rudmania krohni =

Species of gastropod

Rudmania krohni is a species of colorful sea slug, a dorid nudibranch, a marine gastropod mollusc in the family Chromodorididae. This species occurs in European waters (from France to the Canary Islands) and in the Mediterranean Sea (Greece). The specific name krohni was in honour of Russian zoologist August David Krohn.

== Description ==
This nudibranch can reach a maximum length of 30 mm (1.2 in) but a more normal adult size is 15 mm (0.6 in). The colouring is quite variable; the basic colour is pink, mauve or purple with an iridescent border of pale blue or mauve and an outer border of yellow. The dorsal surface bears three longitudinal, white or yellow lines, sometimes continuous and sometimes interrupted and usually slightly raised. These unite at the posterior end near where the purple branchial plumes project from the surface forming a ring around the anus. There is often a pattern of yellow spots between the lines. At the anterior end, the rhinophores are deep purple and lamellar, with 12 to 20 gills. Both rhinophores and branchial plumes can be retracted if the animal is disturbed.

== Distribution ==
Rudmania krohni is native to the eastern Atlantic Ocean and the Mediterranean Sea. In the Atlantic Ocean its range extends from the British Isles as far south as Cape Verde. It feeds on sponges and is to be found in habitats where suitable sponges grow, at depths ranging from 5 to 30 m (16 to 98 ft).

== Ecology ==
Rudmania krohni feeds on sponges in the genus Ircinia, or sometimes on the crumb-of-bread sponge (Hymeniacidon sanguinea), grinding off fragments with its radula; the bright colours and conspicuous appearance of these nudibranchs comes from the pigments and toxins they sequester from the sponge tissues, and indicate to potential predators that they are distasteful, an example of aposematism. Nudibranchs are hermaphrodites, having a set of both male and female reproductive organs. A pair will line up with their right sides adjacent, and each pass a spermatophore (bundle of sperm) to the other. The eggs are laid in a gelatinous spiral on the substrate, some time between April and September. The larvae are planktonic.
