= Eveline Du Bois-Reymond Marcus =

German zoologist and drawer

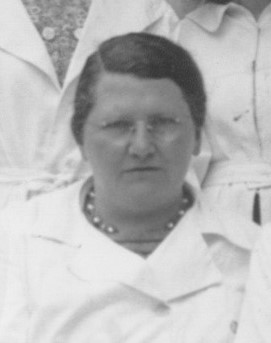
- Eveline Du Bois-Reymond Marcus, 1943
- Born: Eveline Du Bois-Reymond; 6 October 1901; Berlin
- Died: 31 January 1990 (aged 88); São Paulo, Brazil
- Partner: Ernst Gustav Gotthelf Marcus
- Scientific career
- Fields: Zoology
- Workplaces: University of São Paulo
- Author abbrev. (zoology): Ev. Marcus; Du Bois-Reymond Marcus

Eveline du Bois-Reymond Marcus (6 October 1901 – 31 January 1990) was a German zoologist and drawer.

== Life ==
Eveline Du Bois-Reymond was the youngest daughter of Rene and Frieda du Bois-Reymond, as well as a granddaughter of physiologist Emil Du Bois-Reymond. Her father was also a professor of physiology at Berlin University. Her interest in zoology started when she was still a young girl and used to watch small animals in her father's microscope.

From 1923 to 1924, she attended zoology courses at the Berlin University, but did not conclude them because she met a professor of zoology, Ernst Marcus and married him. Together, they started a strong collaboration in zoology, including the study of several invertebrate groups, such as protozoans, ctenophores, flatworms, nemertines, annelids, tardigrades, onychophorans, bryozoans, gastropods, and pycnogonids. She was not listed as an author in their first works together in order to justify Marcus' full-time position as a professor and because she never accepted a remunerated job.

In 1936, due to the rise of Nazism in Germany, Marcus was dismissed from his job and the couple moved to São Paulo, where Marcus had been invited to teach at the University of São Paulo.

During World War II, the couple could not travel to the sea coast because of their German origin. As a result, they dedicated their time to the study of freshwater and land invertebrates, especially turbellarians.

After her husband's death in 1968, Du Bois-Reymond Marcus continued their studies, publishing about 30 papers, mostly on opisthobranch molluscs. In 1973, she was elected an Honorary Member of the Brazilian Malacological Society and in 1979 of the Malacological Society of London. She was also awarded with the title of Doctor Honoris Causa by the University of São Paulo in 1976 and by the University of Marseille in 1988. She died on 31 January 1990 in São Paulo, Brazil, aged 88.

== Bibliography ==
- Du Bois-Reymond Marcus, Eveline (1951). "On South American geoplanids". Boletim da Faculdade de Filosofia, Ciências e Letras da Universidade de São Paulo, Série Zoologia. 16 (16): 217–256. doi:10.11606/issn.2526-4877.bsffclzoologia.1951.125222.
- Du Bois-Reymond Marcus, Eveline (1953). "Some South American triclads". Anais da Academia Brasileira de Ciências. 25 (1): 65–78.
- Du Bois-Reymond Marcus, Eveline (1953). "The opisthobranch Pseudovermis from Brazil". Boletim da Faculdade de Filosofia, Ciências e Letras da Universidade de São Paulo, Série Zoologia. 18: 109–127. doi:10.11606/issn.2526-4877.bsffclzoologia.1953.125185.
- Du Bois-Reymond Marcus, Eveline (1953). "Bryozoa from lake Titicaca". Boletim da Faculdade de Filosofia, Ciências e Letras da Universidade de São Paulo, Série Zoologia. 18 (18): 149–163. doi:10.11606/issn.2526-4877.bsffclzoologia.1953.125187.
- Du Bois-Reymond Marcus, Eveline; Marcus, Ernst (December 1967). American opisthobranch mollusks. Studies in Tropical Oceanography. Vol. 6. University of Miami Institute of Marine Sciences. LCCN 67-31694.
