= C. orientalis =

C. orientalis may refer to:

- Caecilia orientalis, an amphibian species found in Colombia and Ecuador
- Carcharodus orientalis, the Oriental skipper, a butterfly species found in eastern Europe to Asia Minor
- Carpinus orientalis, the Oriental hornbeam, a tree species native from southeastern Europe to northern Iran
- Canna orientalis, a garden plant
- Channa orientalis, the ceylon snakehead, a freshwater fish species found in Sri Lanka
- Chromodoris orientalis, a colorful sea slug species
- Cladogynos orientalis, a plant species found in Southeast Asia and Malesia
- Coccothrinax orientalis, a palm species endemic to eastern Cuba
- Collocalia orientalis, the Mayr's swiftlet, a swift species found in Papua New Guinea and Solomon Islands
- Colutea orientalis, a leguminous shrub species native to Europe and Asia
- Conringia orientalis, the hare's ear mustard, a flowering plant species native to Eurasia
- Crataegus orientalis, a hawthorn species native to the Mediterranean region, Turkey, Caucasia, Crimea and western Iran
- Crocidura orientalis, the Oriental shrew, a mammal species endemic to Indonesia
- Crossobamon orientalis, the Sind gecko, a lizard species found in Pakistan and India
- Cynops orientalis, the Chinese fire belly newt, a small newt species

== Synonyms ==
- Cissus orientalis, a synonym for Ampelopsis arborea, an ornamental plant species native to the United States
- Caudisona orientalis or Crotalus orientalis, synonyms for Crotalus durissus, a snake species found in South America

== See also ==
- Orientalis (disambiguation)
