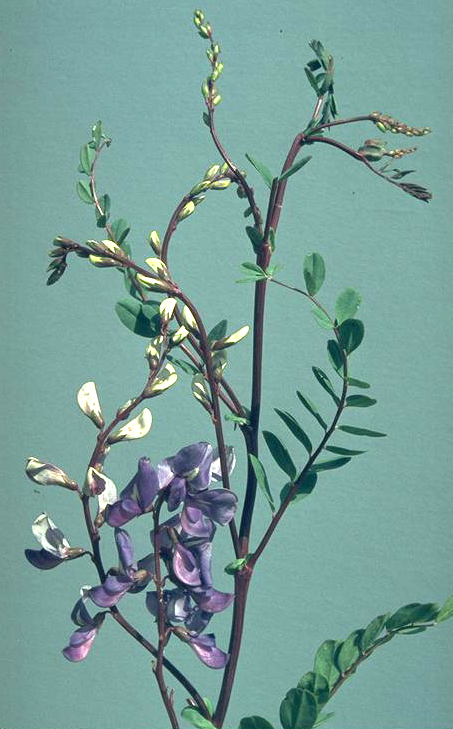

Scientific classification
- Kingdom: Plantae
- Clade: Tracheophytes
- Clade: Angiosperms
- Clade: Eudicots
- Clade: Rosids
- Order: Fabales
- Family: Fabaceae
- Subfamily: Faboideae
- Genus: Swainsona
- Species: S. colutoides

Binomial name
- Swainsona colutoides F.Muell.

Synonyms
- Swainsona colutoides F.Muell. var. colutoides; Swainsonia colutoides F.Muell. orth. var.

= Swainsona colutoides =

Species of plant

Swainsona colutoides, commonly known as bladder senna or bladder vetch, is a species of flowering plant in the family Fabaceae and is endemic to arid areas of Australia. It is an erect annual, shrub-like herb, with imparipinnate leaves usually with up to 13 to 17 egg-shaped leaflets with the narrower end towards the base, and racemes of 10 to 20 purple flowers.

== Description ==
Swainsona colutoides is an annual, shrub-like herb, that typically grows to a height of 1.0–1.3 m (3 ft 3 in – 4 ft 3 in) and has glabrous stems. Its leaves are imparipinnate, mostly 150–200 mm (5.9–7.9 in) long on a short petiole with 13 to 17 egg-shaped leaflets with the narrower end towards the base, 10–13 mm (0.39–0.51 in) long and 5–10 mm (0.20–0.39 in) wide. There are stipules often more than 15 mm (0.59 in) long at the base of the petiole. The flowers are arranged in racemes of 10 to 20 on a peduncle up to 20 mm (0.79 in) long, each flower 15–18 mm (0.59–0.71 in) long on a pedicel 2–4 mm (0.079–0.157 in) long. The sepals are 5–7 mm (0.20–0.28 in) long and joined at the base to from a bell-shaped tube, the sepal lobes shorter than the tube. The petals are purple, the standard petal 11–23 mm (0.43–0.91 in) long and up to 15 mm (0.59 in) wide, the wings 9–16 mm (0.35–0.63 in) long, and the keel 14–24 mm (0.55–0.94 in) long. Flowering mainly occurs from August to December, and the fruit is a crescent-moon shaped pod 25–50 mm (0.98–1.97 in) long and 8–20 mm (0.31–0.79 in) wide with the remains of the style about 9 mm (0.35 in) long.

== Taxonomy and naming ==
Swainsona colutoides was first formally described in 1876 by Ferdinand von Mueller in his Fragmenta Phytographiae Australiae. The specific epithet (colutoides) means "Colutea-like".

== Distribution and habitat ==
This species of pea grows in sandy and clayey soils in Western Australia, the Northern Territory, South Australia and New South Wales. It occurs in the Avon Wheatbelt, Coolgardie, Great Victoria Desert, Mallee and Murchison of Western Australia, the Nullarbor Plain, Great Victoria Desert, Eyre Peninsula and Murray Darling Depression bioregions of South Australia, the MacDonnell Ranges in the Northern Territory and the far south-west of New South Wales.

== Uses ==
An erect annual or biennial, its high production of larger seeds, delayed dehiscence, and low concentrations of the toxin swainsonine gives it potential for development as a forage crop.
