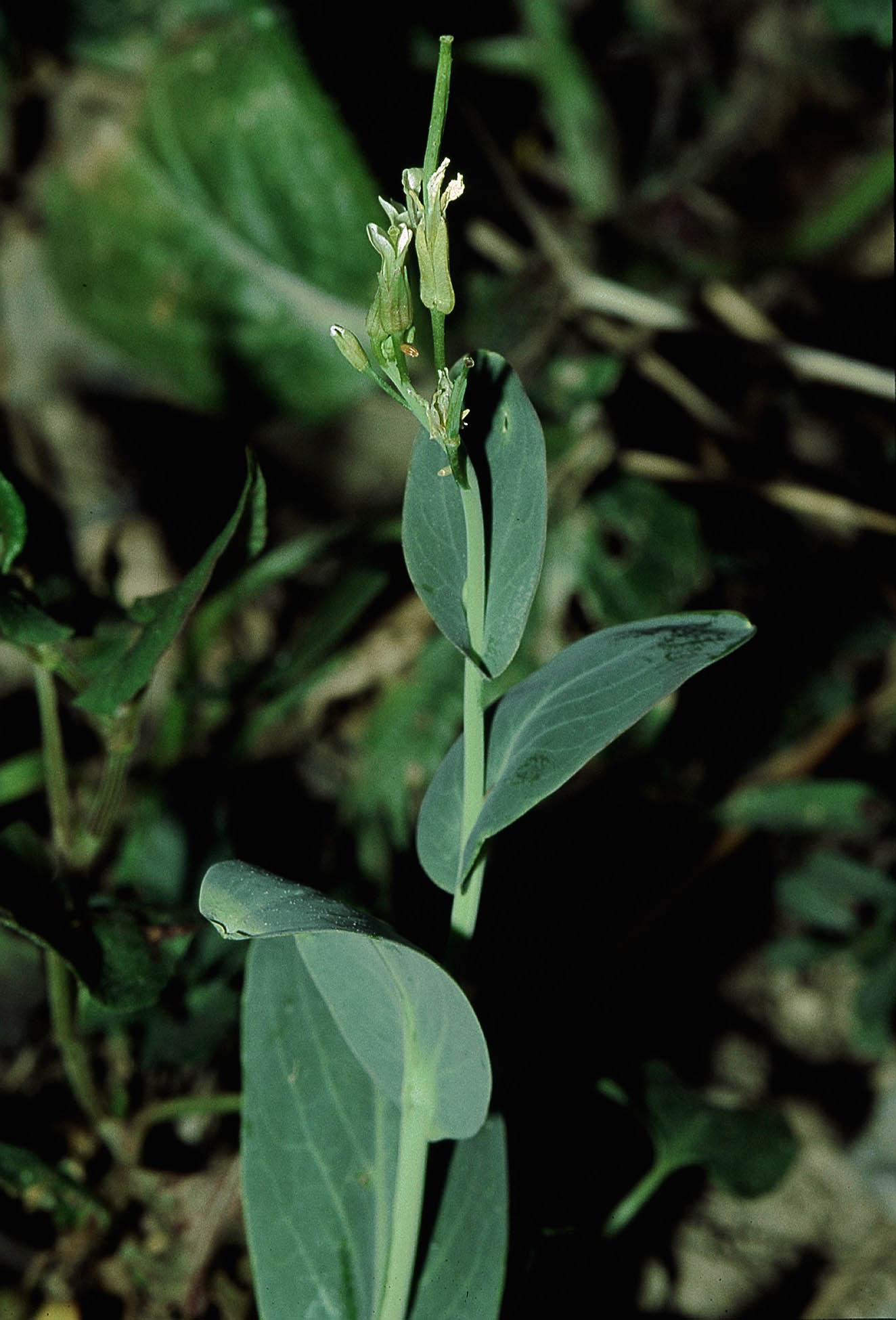
- Conringia orientalis

Scientific classification
- Kingdom: Plantae
- Clade: Tracheophytes
- Clade: Angiosperms
- Clade: Eudicots
- Clade: Rosids
- Order: Brassicales
- Family: Brassicaceae
- Tribe: Conringieae; D.A.German & Al-Shehbaz
- Genus: Conringia; Heist. ex Fabr.

Species
- Conringia austriaca (Jacq.) Sweet; Conringia grandiflora Boiss. & Heldr.; Conringia orientalis (L.) C.Presl

Synonyms
- Goniolobium Beck; Gorinkia J.Presl & C.Presl

= Conringia =

Genus of flowering plants

Conringia is a genus of plants in the mustard family known commonly as hare's ear mustards. These herbs are native to western and central Eurasia and north Africa, although one species Conringia orientalis, is known on many continents as a common weed. The genus was named for the German philosopher Hermann Conring.

Three species are accepted.

- Conringia austriaca (Jacq.) Sweet – Austria and Italy to the Caucasus and northwestern Iran
- Conringia grandiflora Boiss. & Heldr. – Turkey (Antalya)
- Conringia orientalis (L.) C.Presl – Central Europe and North Africa to Central Asia and Pakistan
