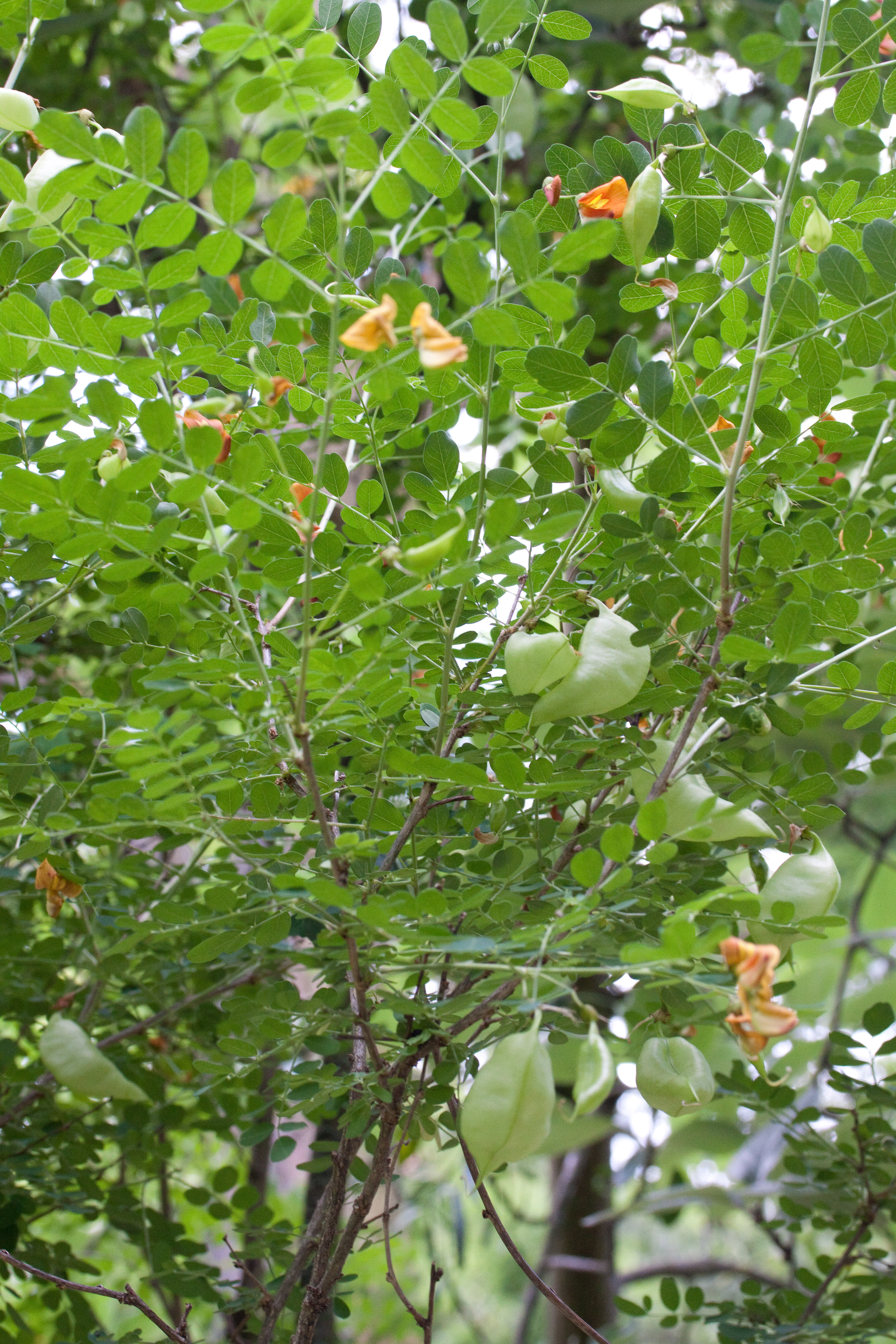

Scientific classification
- Kingdom: Plantae
- Clade: Tracheophytes
- Clade: Angiosperms
- Clade: Eudicots
- Clade: Rosids
- Order: Fabales
- Family: Fabaceae
- Subfamily: Faboideae
- Genus: Colutea
- Species: C. orientalis

Binomial name
- Colutea orientalis Mill.

= Colutea orientalis =

Species of legume

Colutea orientalis is a species of leguminous shrub native to Europe and Asia. It is a deciduous, grey-leafed, bushy shrub that grows to a height of up to 2 m (6 ft). It bears clusters of small yellow and coppery-red flowers in summer, followed by green seed pods. Colutea × media is a hybrid between C. orientalis and C. arborescens.

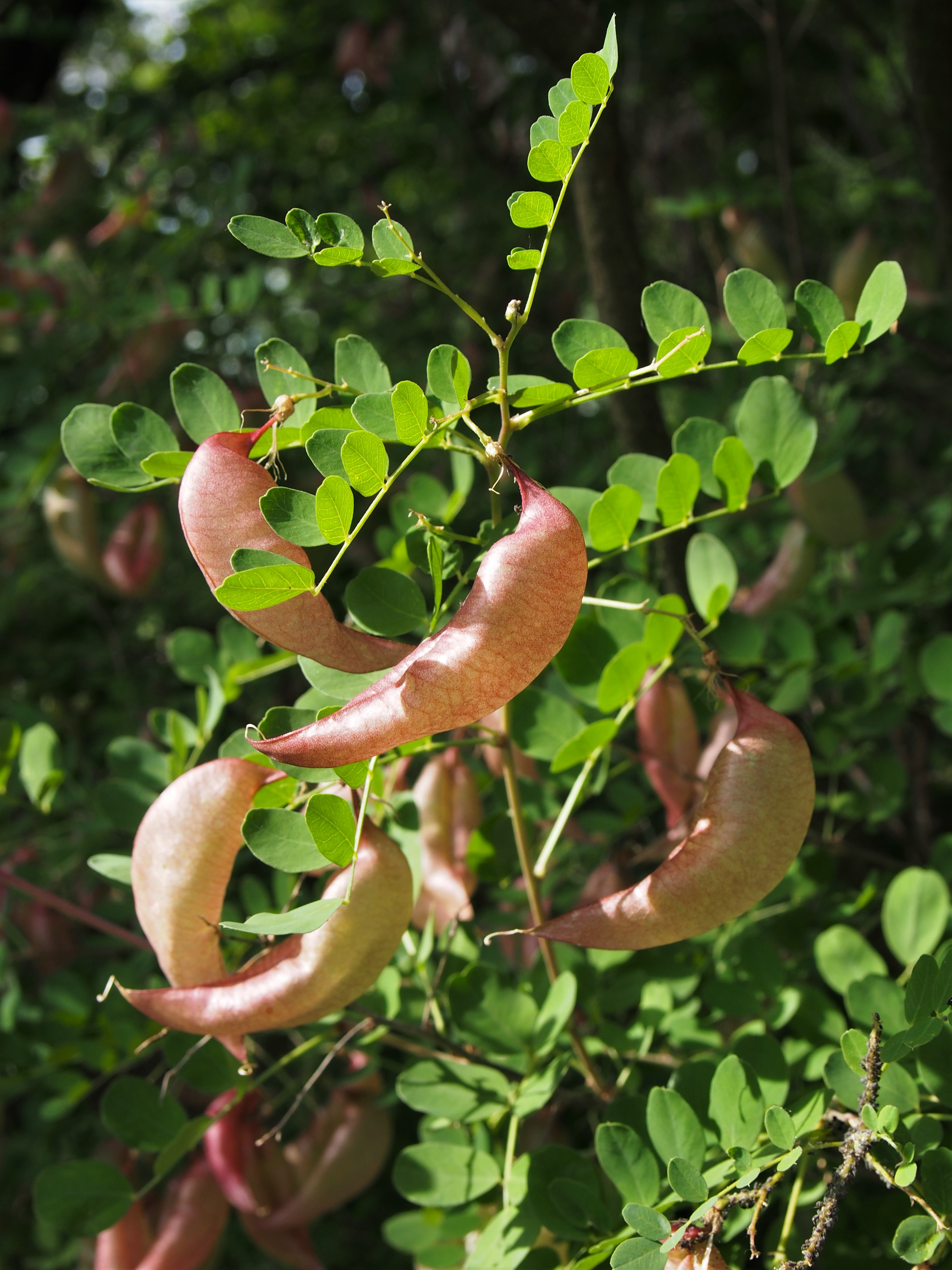
Colutea × media

== Sources ==
- Chatto, Beth; Wooster, Steven (23 March 2000). Beth Chatto's Gravel Gardens. Frances Lincoln Ltd. ISBN 9780711214255.
- "Fabaceae Tribe Galegeae". Flora of China.
- "Colutea orientalis". International Legume Database & Information Service. Archived from the original on September 28, 2006.
- Brickell, Christopher (1996). Gardener's Encyclopedia of Plants & Flowers. Colour Library Books. p. 442. ISBN 1-85833-472-1.
