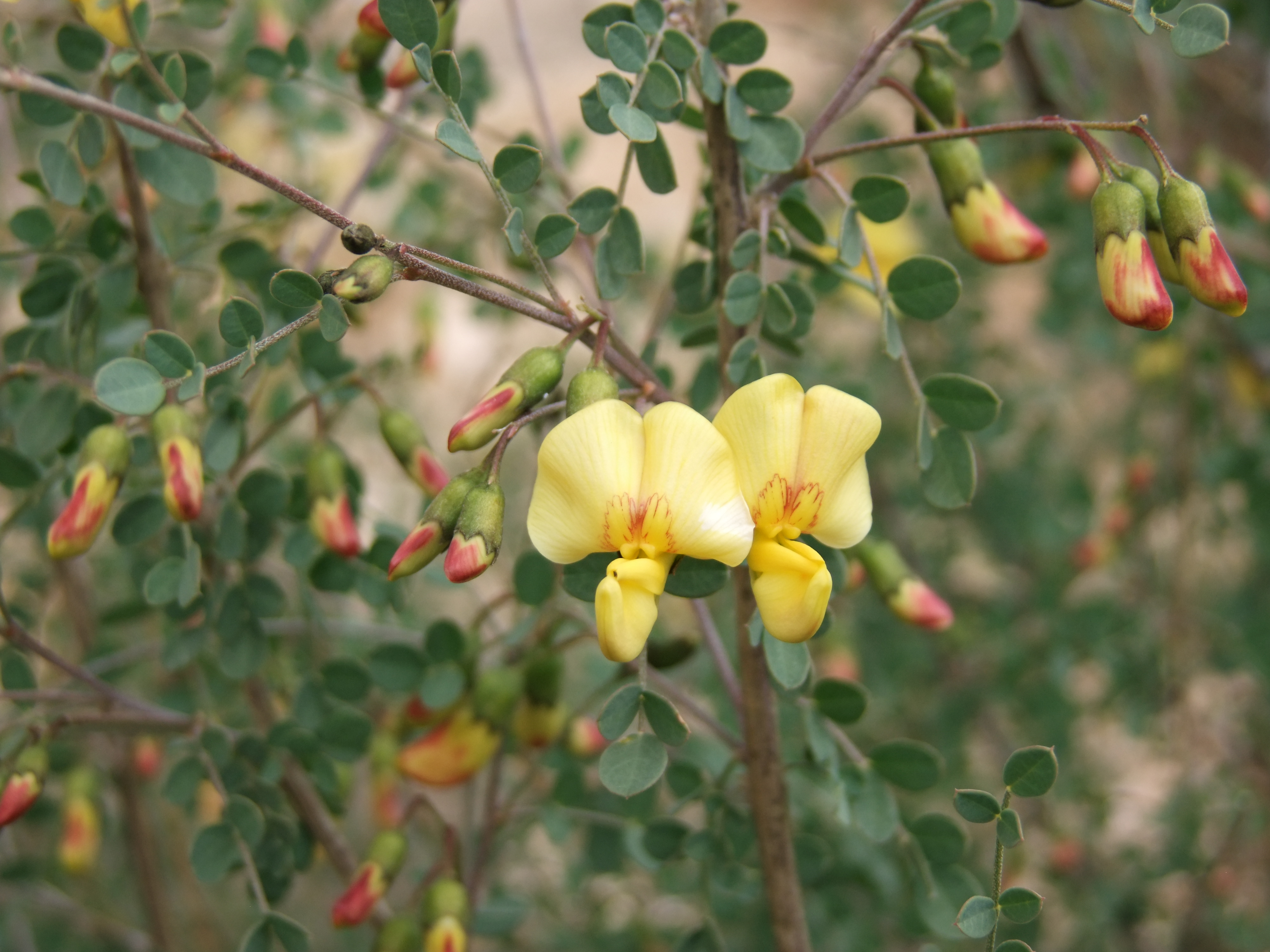
- Flowering in Israel
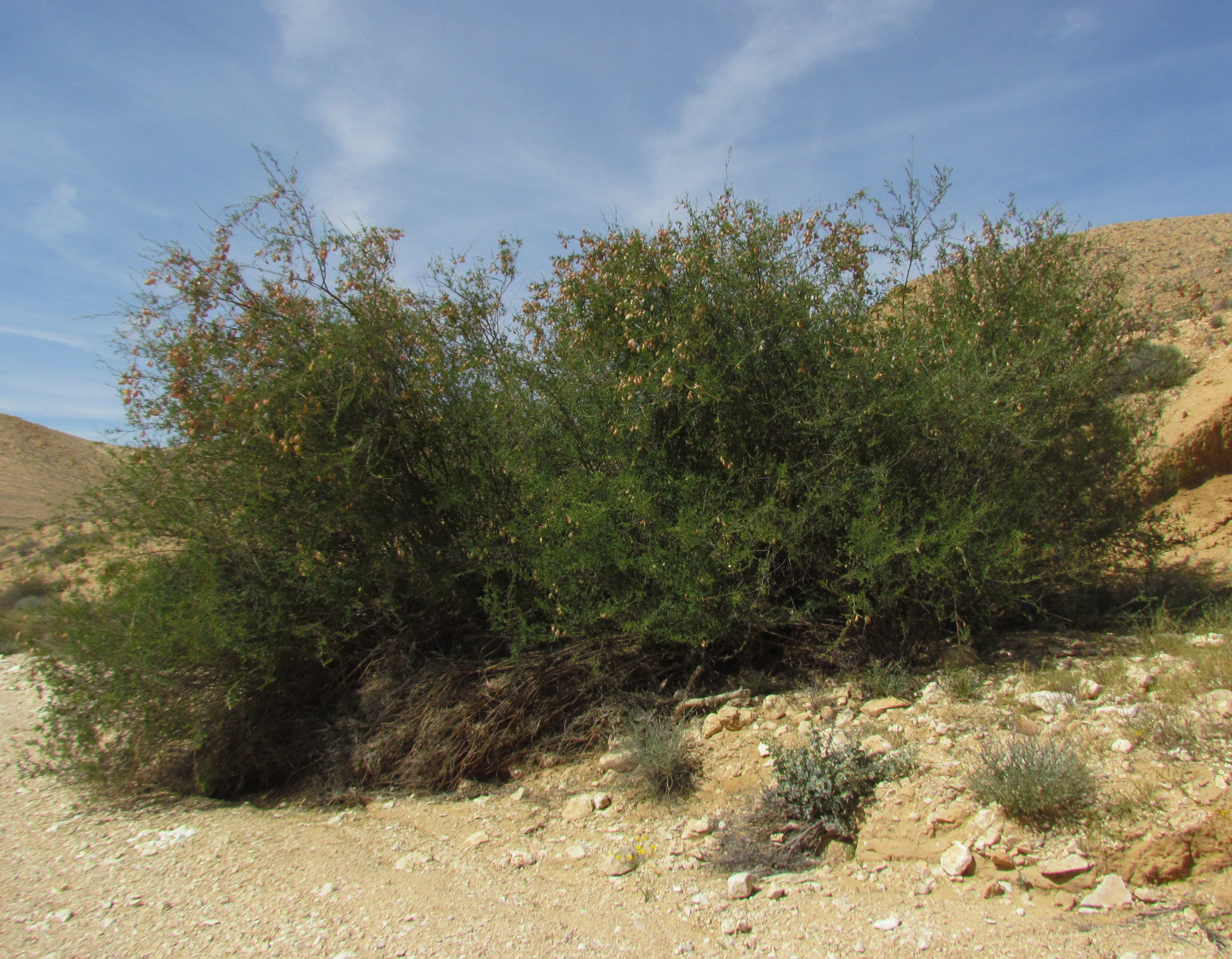
- Habit

Scientific classification
- Kingdom: Plantae
- Clade: Tracheophytes
- Clade: Angiosperms
- Clade: Eudicots
- Clade: Rosids
- Order: Fabales
- Family: Fabaceae
- Subfamily: Faboideae
- Genus: Colutea
- Species: C. istria

Binomial name
- Colutea istria Mill.

Synonyms
- Colutea halepica Lam.; Colutea microphylla Delile; Colutea pallida Salisb.; Colutea pocockii Aiton

= Colutea istria =

Species of plant

Colutea istria, or Pocock's bladder senna, is a species of flowering plant in the family Fabaceae. It is native to southeastern Turkey, the Levant, and the Sinai Peninsula. A deciduous shrub, it has inflated fruit pods.

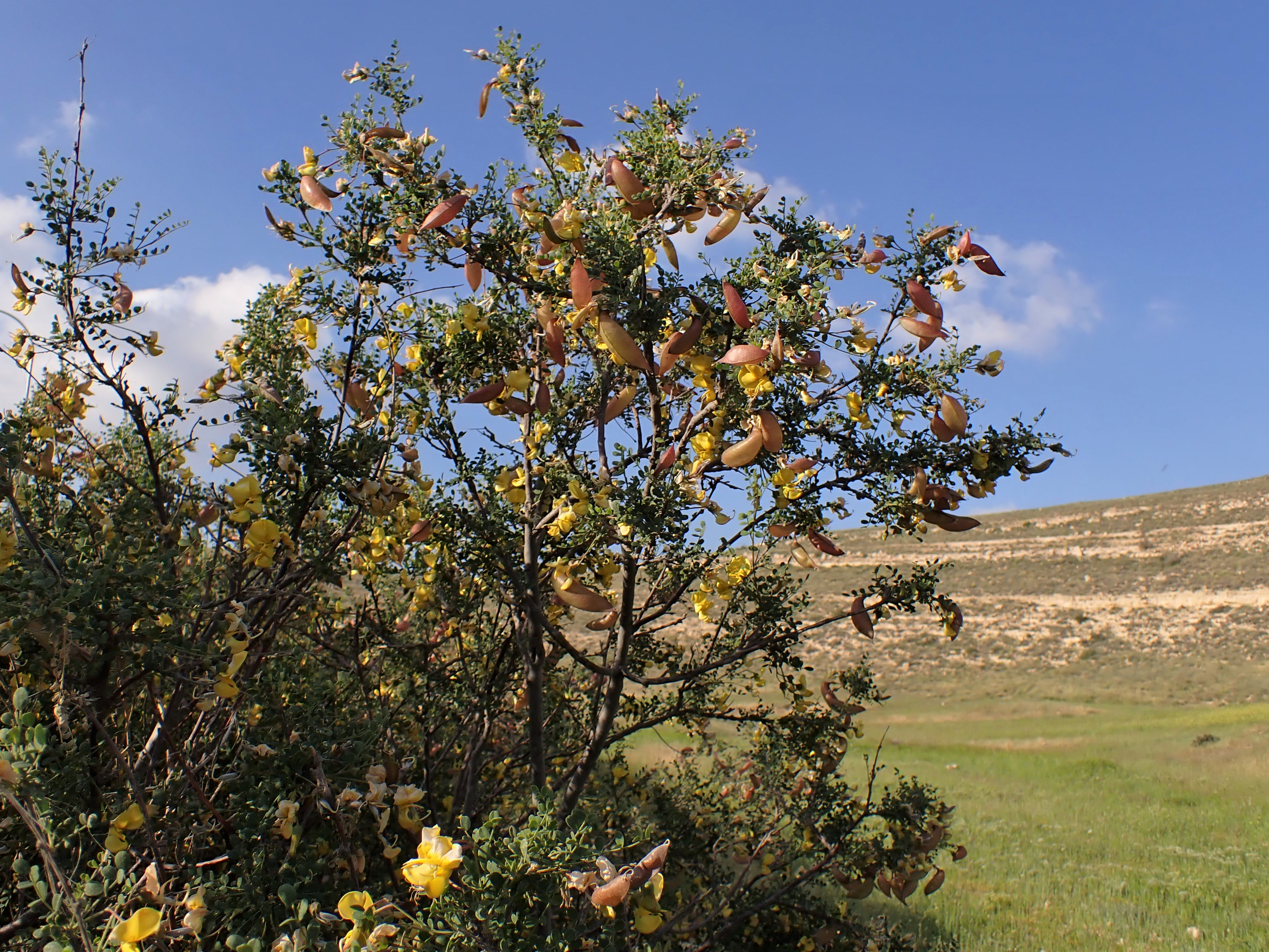
Pods in Jordan
