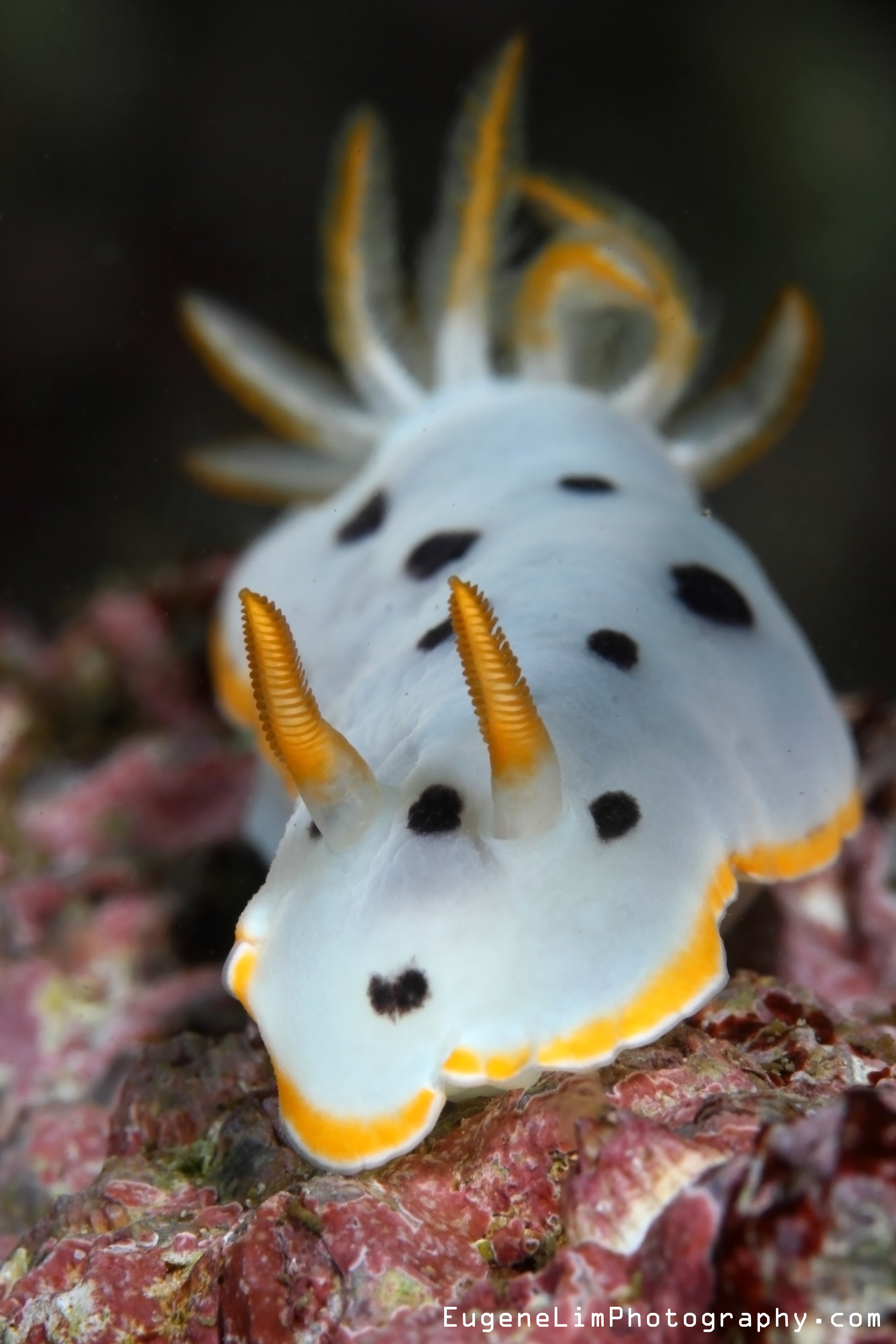

Scientific classification
- Kingdom: Animalia
- Phylum: Mollusca
- Class: Gastropoda
- Order: Nudibranchia
- Family: Chromodorididae
- Genus: Chromodoris
- Species: C. orientalis

Binomial name
- Chromodoris orientalis Rudman, 1983

= Chromodoris orientalis =

Species of gastropod

Chromodoris orientalis is a species of colourful nudibranch in the family Chromodorididae. It is a white sea slug with irregularly spaced black spots and a yellow, orange, or brown ring around its whole body and on its gills.

== Distribution ==
They are commonly found in Sagami Bay and on the Echizen Coast of Japan. They are also less frequently seen in Taiwan, Hong Kong, and Korea.

== Description ==
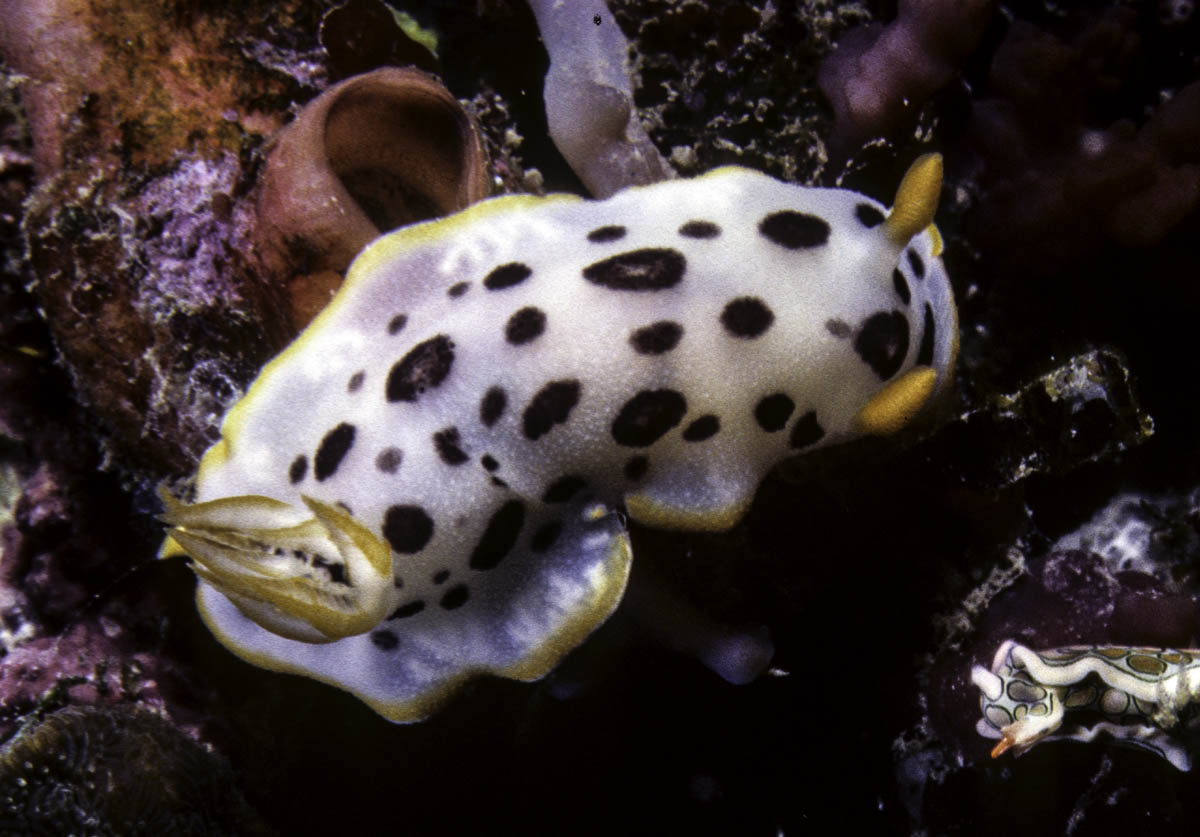

Chromodoris orientalis is translucent white with oval black spots on the mantle. The edge of the mantle has a narrow orange border and the rhinophore clubs and outer gill surfaces are orange. The rhinophores are scent and taste receptors that protrude on the front of the sea slug, the gills protrude on the opposite end from the rhinophores. They, like other sea slugs, use their foot to move around, which they protect with a thick mantle that secretes toxins. The maximum size and weight of these animals is unknown.

== Diet ==
Chromodoris orientalis have various feeding methods and are generally carnivorous. They feed on sponges, hydroids, bryozoans, entoprocts, and ascidians.

== Defense ==
This species is thought to be good at camouflaging and hiding in tight crevices. Related nudibranchs have been known to accumulate sponge toxins in their mantle.

== Reproduction ==
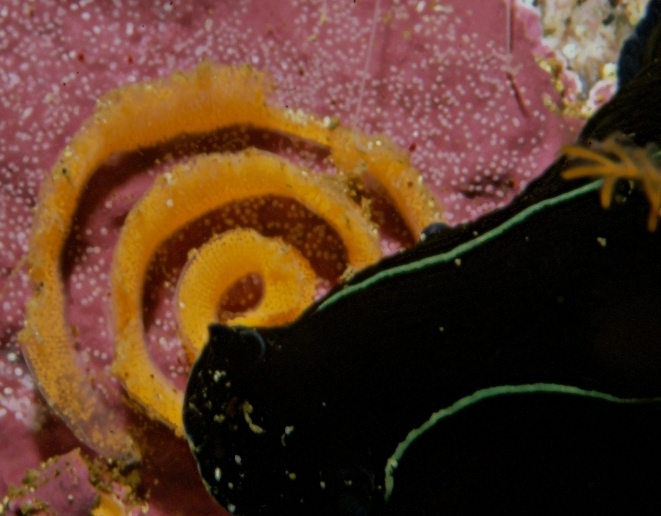
An example of a similar egg whorl laid by Tambja capensis.

Chromodoris orientalis lay eggs in long ribbons that are attached along one side to algae or potentially other substrates. Egg size was studied among them and three others in the Chromodoris genus, and it was found that eggs size varied among species but did not change within species depending on the parental body length. The number of egg whorls also varied depending on the species. They reproduce sexually and are simultaneous hermaphrodites (as are all nudibranchs), possessing both male and female reproductive organs at the same time. When they mate, they dart their penises at one another, with the first to penetrate the other becoming the male parent. Their eggs are laid in whorls, which then hatch to become vestigial veliger larvae until they grow into adults.
