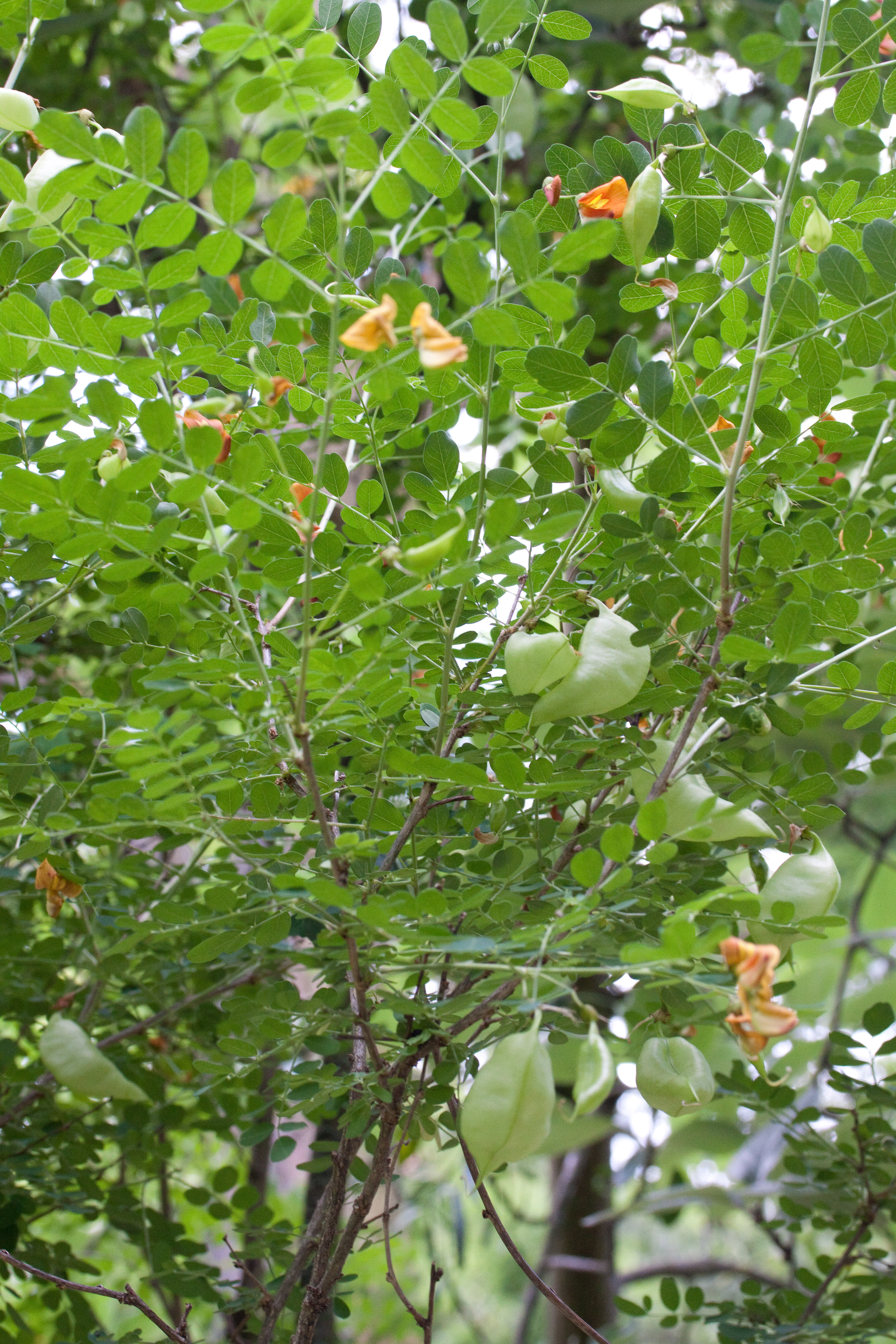
- Colutea orientalis

Scientific classification
- Kingdom: Plantae
- Clade: Tracheophytes
- Clade: Angiosperms
- Clade: Eudicots
- Clade: Rosids
- Order: Fabales
- Family: Fabaceae
- Subfamily: Faboideae
- Tribe: Galegeae
- Subtribe: Astragalinae
- Genus: Colutea; L. (1753)

Species
- See text.

Synonyms
- Baguenaudiera Bubani (1899); Oreophysa (Bunge ex Boiss.) Bornm. (1905)

= Colutea =

Genus of legumes

Colutea is a genus of about 28 species of deciduous flowering shrubs in the legume family, Fabaceae, growing from 2–5 metres (6 1/2–16 1/2 ft) tall and native to the Old World. They are sometimes called bladder sennas, although they are not particularly closely related to the true sennas.

== Description ==
The leaves are pinnate and light green to glaucous grey-green. The flowers are yellow to orange, pea-shaped and produced in racemes throughout the summer. These are followed by the attractive inflated seed pods which change from pale green to red or copper in colour.

== Species ==
As of April 2023, Plants of the World Online accepted the following species:

- Colutea abyssinica Kunth & C.D.Bouché
- Colutea acutifolia Shap.
- Colutea afghanica Browicz
- Colutea arborescens L.
- Colutea armata Hemsl. & Lace
- Colutea armena Boiss. & A.Huet
- Colutea atabajevii B.Fedtsch.
- Colutea atlantica Browicz
- Colutea brachyptera Sumnev.
- Colutea brevialata Lange
- Colutea buhsei (Boiss.) Shap.
- Colutea cilicica Boiss. & Balansa
- Colutea delavayi Franch.
- Colutea gifana Parsa
- Colutea gracilis Freyn & Sint.
- Colutea insularis Browicz
- Colutea istria Mill.
- Colutea jamnolenkoi Shap.
- Colutea komarovii Takht.
- Colutea melanocalyx Boiss. & Heldr.
- Colutea multiflora Shap. ex Ali
- Colutea nepalensis Sims
- Colutea orientalis Mill.
- Colutea paulsenii Freyn
- Colutea persica Boiss.
- Colutea porphyrogramma Rech.f.
- Colutea triphylla Bunge ex Boiss.
- Colutea uniflora Beck ex Stapf
- Colutea × variabilis Browicz

== Distribution and habitat ==
The genus is native to southern Europe, north Africa and southwest Asia.

== Ecology ==
Colutea species are used as food plants by the larvae of some Lepidoptera species including Coleophora colutella.

== Cultivation ==
Colutea arborescens, is in general cultivation in the UK. It was imported early, before 1568, probably for medicinal purposes, but now is grown mostly for its attractive seed pods, used in dried arrangements. Though in Virginia Thomas Jefferson had it and it appears in Lady Jean Skipwith's lists of plants, in US gardens, it is little more than a marginal curiosity.

Colutea arborescens will grow in poor sandy soils in preference to heavy or loamy soils. It has become naturalised in the UK, where it established itself in the sharp drainage of railway embankments. It is easy to propagate from seed. It is generally pest resistant, though garden snails will climb up the plant in wet weather to eat the leaves. The hybrid Colutea × media (C. arborescens × C. orientalis) is also cultivated for its coppery flowers.

== Uses ==
The Bedouins of the Sinai and Negev would, in times of scarcity, eat the seeds of C. istria.
