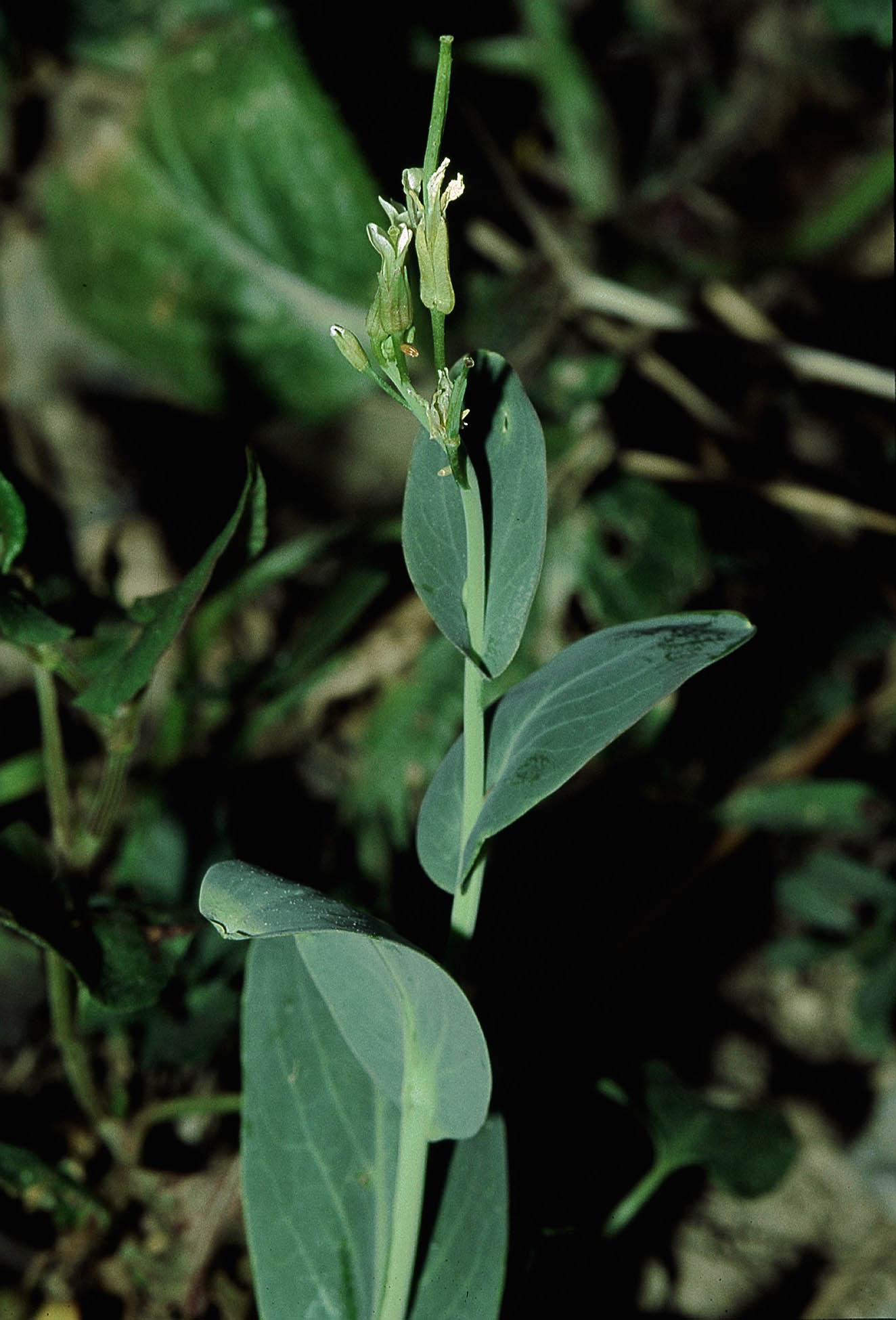

Scientific classification
- Kingdom: Plantae
- Clade: Embryophytes
- Clade: Tracheophytes
- Clade: Spermatophytes
- Clade: Angiosperms
- Clade: Eudicots
- Clade: Rosids
- Order: Brassicales
- Family: Brassicaceae
- Genus: Conringia
- Species: C. orientalis

Binomial name
- Conringia orientalis (L.) C.Presl

= Conringia orientalis =

Species of flowering plant

Conringia orientalis is a species of flowering plant in the mustard family known by the common name hare's ear mustard. It is native to Eurasia but it is known elsewhere as an introduced species and sometimes a noxious weed. It is weedy in its native range and also in North America, where it is a widespread invasive species, especially in central Canada.

It is an annual herb producing an unbranched erect stem 30 to 70 centimetres (12 to 28 inches) in height. The thick, waxy leaves are generally oval in shape, up to 9 centimetres (3 1/2 inches) long, and clasp the stem at their bases. The flower is enclosed in pointed sepals and has yellow, clawed petals about 1 centimetre (1/3 inch) long. The fruit is a beaded silique up to 13 centimetres (5 inches) long. The plant is known to be toxic to livestock.
