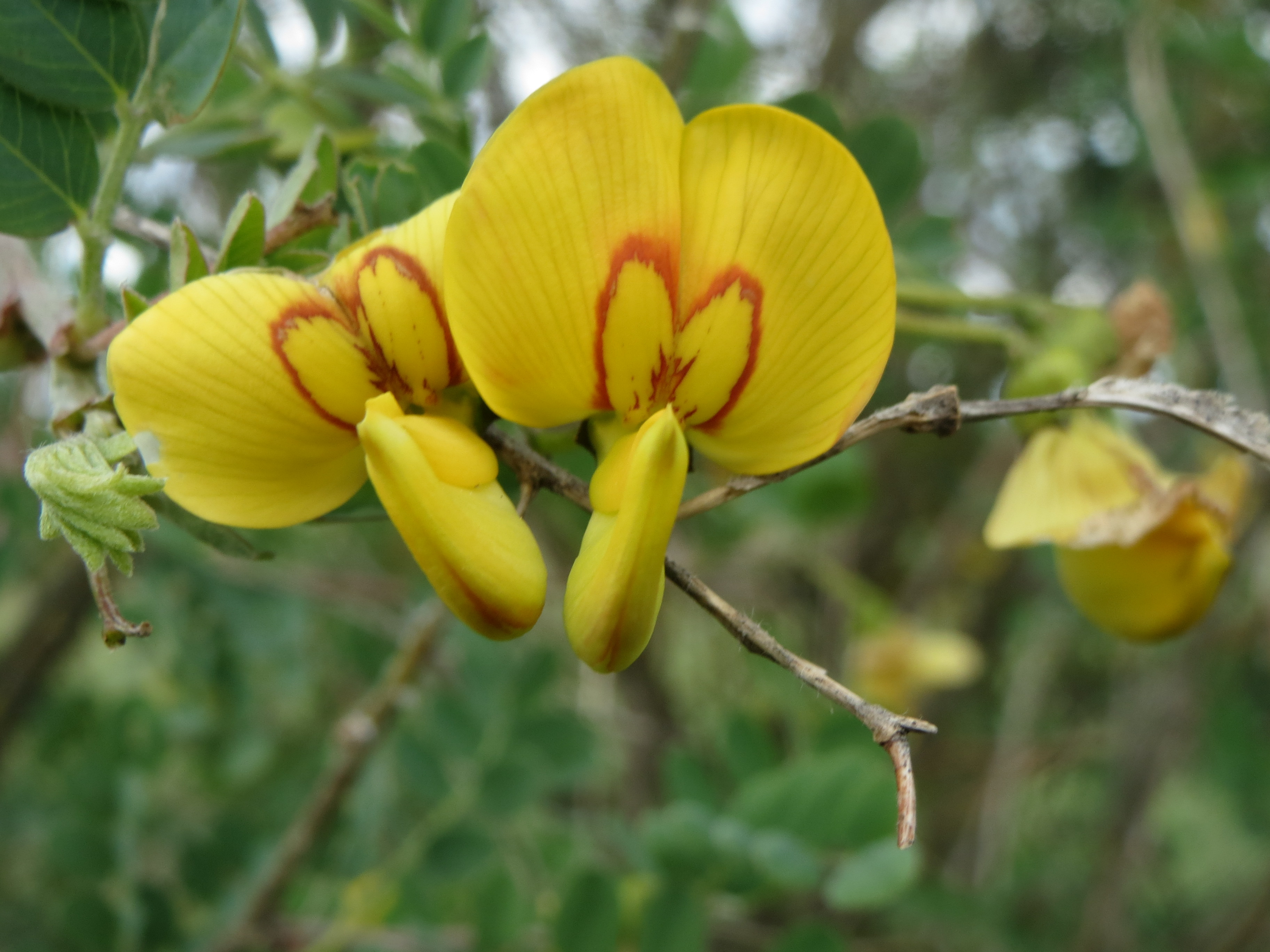

Scientific classification
- Kingdom: Plantae
- Clade: Tracheophytes
- Clade: Angiosperms
- Clade: Eudicots
- Clade: Rosids
- Order: Fabales
- Family: Fabaceae
- Subfamily: Faboideae
- Genus: Colutea
- Species: C. arborescens

Binomial name
- Colutea arborescens L.

Subspecies
- Colutea arborescens subsp. arborescens; Colutea arborescens subsp. hispanica (Talavera & Arista) Mateo & M.B.Crespo

Synonyms
- List: Colutea florida Salisb.

= Colutea arborescens =

Species of plant in the pea family

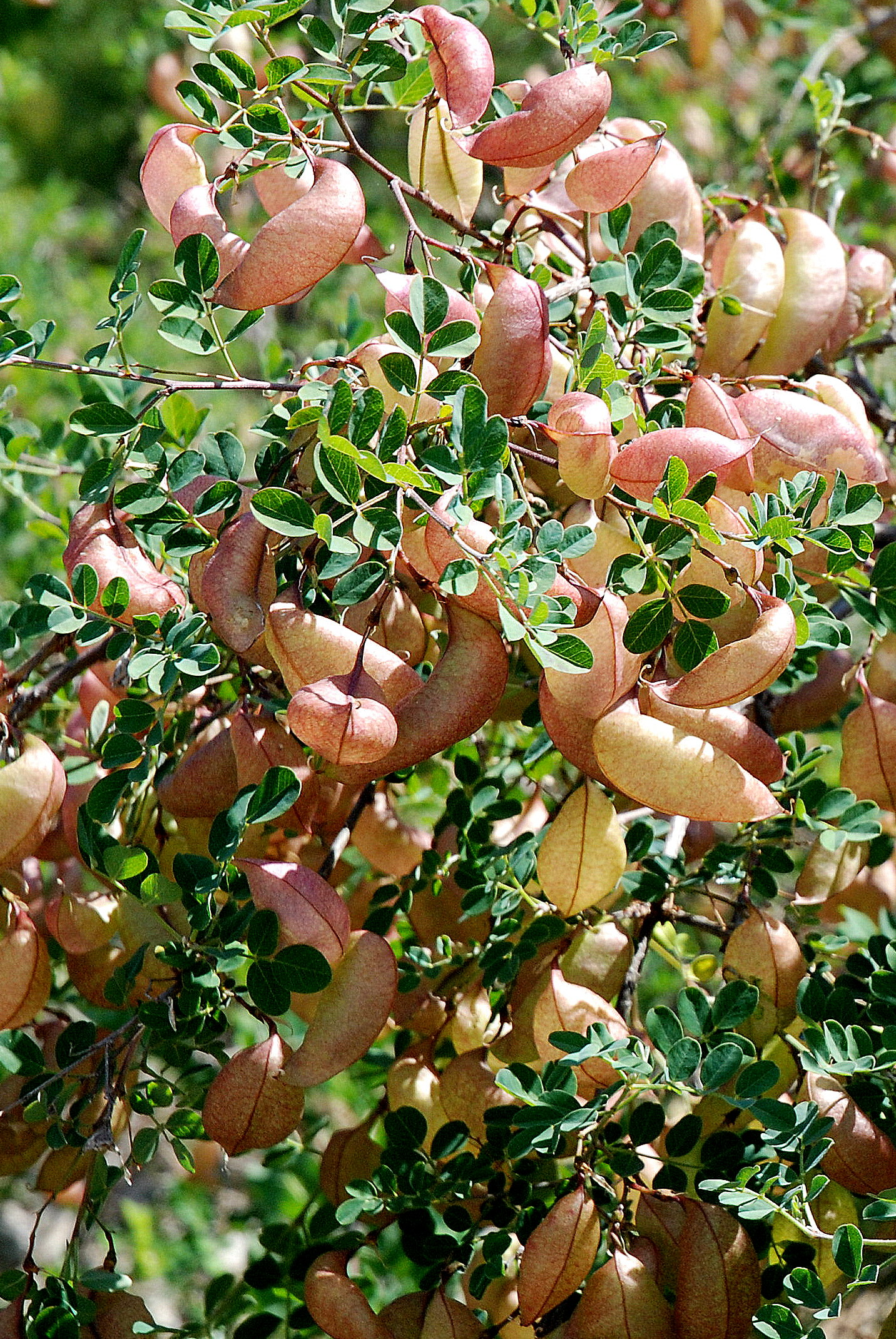

Colutea arborescens is a species of leguminous shrub known by the common name bladder-senna. It is native to Europe and North Africa, but it is known on other continents where it is grown as an ornamental and used in landscaping for erosion control. It is also known in the wild as an occasionally weedy escapee from cultivation.

== Description ==
It is a vigorous shrub to 3 metres (10 ft), takes a rounded form and has many branches covered in deciduous leaves. The leaves are pale green and made up of many pairs of slightly hairy oval-shaped leaflets, each up to about 3 centimetres (1 1/4 in) long. The inflorescence is a raceme of generally pea-like yellow flowers about 3 cm long. The fruit is an inflated bladdery pod which dries to a papery texture. It is 2 to 3 cm long and contains many seeds.

== Taxonomy ==
Botanist John Gerard noted that C. arborescens is not true senna, "though we have followed others in giving it to name Bastard Sena, which name is very unproper [sic] to it".

== Cultivation ==
It will grow in poor dry soil in exposed conditions but likes full sun. It propagates by seed or softwood cuttings.
